= Becky G discography =

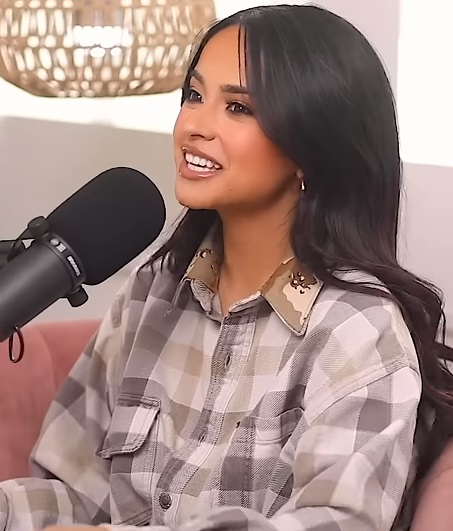
- Gomez in 2023
- Studio albums: 5
- EPs: 1
- Singles: 91
- Promotional singles: 19

American singer Becky G has released five studio albums, one extended play (EP), 91 singles (including 27 as a featured artist) and 19 promotional singles. According to the RIAA, she has achieved 17 million certified units. (Note: As of May 2026, Gomez's albums have garnered 600,000 certified units. She has had a cumulative single certifications of 15.7 million digital downloads and on-demand streaming as a lead artist (including collaborations), and 740,000 as a featured artist.) She has a total of 8 chart entries on the US Billboard Hot 100, and 31 chart entries on the Hot Latin Songs, including a number-one hit and six top ten songs.

Gomez signed with Kemosabe Records in a joint venture with RCA Records. She released her debut extended play titled Play It Again (2013). The single from the EP "Can't Get Enough", reached the top ten on the Latin Airplay. She released the single "Shower", which peaked at number sixteen in the US. In June 2016, Gomez released her first full Spanish-language single "Sola", as her debut into the Latin music market. It reached the top twenty on the Hot Latin Songs. Gomez has also released various collaborative singles.

Gomez's debut studio album, Mala Santa (2019), debuted in the top five on the Top Latin Albums and Latin Rhythm Albums charts, and debuted at number 85 on the US Billboard 200. It spawned two top five singles on the Hot Latin Songs —"Mayores" and "Sin Pijama". Her second studio album, Esquemas (2022), debuted atop the Latin Pop Albums and the top five on the Top Latin Albums charts, and debuted at number 92 in the US. She achieved her highest-charting single "Mamiii" on the Hot 100, and topped the Latin charts. Her third studio album, Esquinas (2023), debuted in the top ten on the Top Latin Albums and Regional Mexican Albums charts, and debuted at number 109 in the US. The album's fourth single "Por el Contrario" topped the charts on the Latin Airplay and Regional Mexican Airplay. Her fourth studio album, Encuentros (2024), debuted at number fifteen on the Top Latin Albums and top ten on the Regional Mexican Albums charts. Her fifth studio album, Baraja Bendita (2026), debuted at number twelve on the Top Latin Albums and the top five on the Latin Pop Albums and the top ten on the Latin Rhythm Albums charts.

== Studio albums ==
List of studio albums, showing selected details, chart positions and certifications
Title	Album details	Peak chart positions							Certifications
Title	Album details	US	US Latin	US Latin Pop	US Latin Rh	US Reg. Mex	ITA	SPA	Certifications
Mala Santa	Released: October 17, 2019; Label: Kemosabe; Formats: Digital download, streaming	85	3	—	3	—	92	20	RIAA: 7× Platinum (Latin); AMPROFON: Platinum
Esquemas	Released: May 13, 2022; Label: Kemosabe, RCA; Formats: Digital download, streaming	92	5	1	—	—	—	28	RIAA: 3× Platinum (Latin); AMPROFON: Platinum
Esquinas	Released: September 28, 2023; Label: Kemosabe, RCA; Formats: Digital download, streaming	109	7	—	—	3	—	—	AMPROFON: Platinum
Encuentros	Released: October 10, 2024; Label: Kemosabe, RCA; Formats: Digital download, streaming	—	15	—	—	9	—	—	
Baraja Bendita	Released: August 14, 2026; Label: RCA; Formats: CD, LP, digital download, streaming	— (Note: Baraja Bendita did not enter the US Billboard 200, but peaked at number 38 on the Top Album Sales.)	12	2	7	—	—	—	
"—" denotes a recording that did not chart or was not released in that territory.

== Extended plays ==
List of extended plays, showing selected details and chart positions
Title	EP details	Peak chart positions
Title	EP details	US Heat
Play It Again	Released: July 16, 2013; Label: Kemosabe; Formats: CD, digital download, streaming	17

== Singles ==
=== As lead artist ===
==== 2010s ====
List of singles released in the 2010s decade as lead artist, showing selected chart positions, certifications, and associated albums
Title	Year	Peak chart positions										Certifications	Album
Title	Year	US	US Latin	US Latin Air	ARG	COL	ECU	FRA	ITA	MEX	SPA	Certifications	Album
"Becky from the Block"	2013	—	—	—	—	—	—	—	—	—	—		Non-album single
"Can't Get Enough" (featuring Pitbull)	2014	—	10	2	—	—	—	—	—	—	—		Play It Again
"Shower"	2014	16	—	— (Note: "Shower" did not enter the Latin Airplay, but peaked at number 36 on the Latin Pop Airplay.)	—	—	—	155	—	—	37	RIAA: 2× Platinum; AMPROFON: 2× Platinum+Gold; FIMI: Gold; PROMUSICAE: Platinum	Non-album singles
"Can't Stop Dancin'"	2014	88	—	—	—	—	—	—	—	—	—	RIAA: Platinum	Non-album singles
"Lovin' So Hard"	2015	—	—	—	—	—	—	—	—	—	—		Non-album singles
"Break a Sweat"	2015	— (Note: "Break a Sweat" did not enter the Billboard Hot 100, but peaked at number 36 on the Pop Airplay.)	—	—	—	—	—	—	—	—	—		Non-album singles
"Sola"	2016	—	18	35	—	—	—	—	—	— (Note: "Sola" did not enter the Mexico Airplay, but peaked at number 17 on the Mexico Español Airplay.)	83		Non-album singles
"Mangú"	2016	—	47	—	—	—	—	—	—	—	—		Non-album singles
"Todo Cambió" (Note: Gomez released two remixes: the first featuring CNCO in March 2017, and the second with Justin Quiles in April, 2017.)	2017	—	33	— (Note: "Todo Cambió" did not enter the Latin Airplay, but peaked at number 31 on the Latin Pop Airplay.)	—	—	—	—	—	—	94 (Note: In Spain, the remix version of "Todo Cambió" featuring CNCO charted separatedly from its original version.)		Non-album singles
"Mayores" (with Bad Bunny)	2017	74	3	1	— (Note: "Mayores" did not enter the Argentina Hot 100, but peaked at number 5 on the Monitor Latino Argentina Latin Airplay.)	8	1	—	—	33	1	RIAA: 46× Platinum (Latin); AMPROFON: 2× Diamond+2× Platinum; CAPIF: Gold; FIMI: Gold; PROMUSICAE: 5× Platinum; SNEP: Gold	Mala Santa
"Díganle" (Note: A remix with CNCO was released on August 17, 2018.) (with Leslie Grace)	2017	—	36 (Note: In Hot Latin Songs, the remix version of "Díganle" featuring CNCO charted separatedly from its original version.)	— (Note: "Díganle" (Remix) did not enter the Latin Airplay, but peaked at number 20 on the Latin Pop Airplay.)	57 (Note: In Argentina, the remix version of "Díganle" featuring CNCO charted separatedly from its original version.)	—	53 (Note: In Ecuador, the remix version of "Díganle" featuring CNCO charted separatedly from its original version.)	—	—	—	—	RIAA: 2× Platinum (Latin); AMPROFON: Gold	Non-album single
"Ya Es Hora" (with Ana Mena and De la Ghetto)	2018	—	—	—	—	—	—	—	—	—	29	PROMUSICAE: Platinum	Index
"Sin Pijama" (with Natti Natasha)	2018	70	4	1	3	11	23	185	80	15	1	RIAA: 38× Platinum (Latin); AMPROFON: 2× Diamond+4× Platinum; FIMI: Platinum; PROMUSICAE: 6× Platinum; SNEP: Gold	Mala Santa
"Cuando Te Besé" (with Paulo Londra)	2018	—	30	28	1	20	11	—	—	— (Note: "Cuando Te Besé" did not enter the Mexico Airplay, but peaked at number 34 on the Mexico Espanol Airplay.)	10	RIAA: 2× Platinum (Latin); AMPROFON: 2× Diamond+2× Platinum; CAPIF: Gold; PROMUSICAE: 3× Platinum	Mala Santa
"Pienso en Ti" (with Joss Favela)	2018	—	— (Note: "Pienso en Ti" did not enter the Hot Latin Songs, but peaked at number 15 on the Latin Digital Song Sales.)	—	—	—	—	—	—	—	—		Caminando
"Booty" (with C. Tangana)	2018	—	—	—	66	80	16	—	—	—	3	RIAA: 4× Platinum (Latin); AMPROFON: 2× Platinum; PROMUSICAE: 3× Platinum	Non-album singles
"LBD"	2019	—	—	—	—	—	—	—	—	—	—		Non-album singles
"Green Light Go"	2019	—	—	—	—	—	—	—	—	—	—		Non-album singles
"La Respuesta" (with Maluma)	2019	—	13	—	24	—	10	—	—	— (Note: "La Respuesta" did not enter the Mexico Airplay, but peaked at number 20 on the Mexico Espanol Airplay.)	29	AMPROFON: Platinum+Gold; PROMUSICAE: Platinum	Non-album singles
"Next to You" (Note: On May 24, 2019, a remix featuring Nigerian singer Davido was released.) (with Digital Farm Animals featuring Rvssian)	2019	— (Note: "Next to You" did not enter the Billboard Hot 100, but peaked at number 34 on the Hot Dance/Electronic Songs.)	—	—	—	—	—	—	—	—	—		Non-album singles
"Que Me Baile" (with ChocQuibTown)	2019	—	—	—	—	4	—	—	—	—	96		ChocQuib House
"Dollar" (with Myke Towers)	2019	—	28	22	37	—	—	—	—	—	19	AMPROFON: 2× Platinum+Gold; PROMUSICAE: Platinum	Mala Santa
"Secrets"	2019	—	—	—	—	—	—	—	—	—	—		Non-album single
"Mala Santa"	2019	—	21	—	90	—	6	—	63	—	68	RIAA: Platinum (Latin); AMPROFON: 2× Platinum+Gold; FIMI: Gold; PROMUSICAE: Platinum	Mala Santa
"—" denotes a recording that did not chart or was not released in that territory.

==== 2020s ====
List of singles released in the 2020s decade as lead artist, showing selected chart positions, certifications, and associated albums
Title	Year	Peak chart positions									Certifications	Album
Title	Year	US	US Latin	US Latin Air	ARG	BOL	MEX	SPA	SWI	WW	Certifications	Album
"Perdiendo la Cabeza" (with Carlos Rivera and Pedro Capó)	2020	—	—	42	39	—	1	— (Note: "Perdiendo la Cabeza" did not enter the PROMUSICAE, but peaked at number 24 on the Spanish Airplay.)	—	—	RIAA: Platinum (Latin); AMPROFON: 4× Platinum+Gold; PROMUSICAE: Gold	Crónicas de una Guerra
"They Ain't Ready"	2020	—	—	—	—	—	—	—	—	—		Non-album single
"Muchacha" (with Gente de Zona)	2020	—	— (Note: "Muchacha" did not enter the Hot Latin Songs, but peaked at number 9 on the Latin Digital Song Sales.)	50	—	—	—	82	—	—	RIAA: Platinum (Latin); PROMUSICAE: Platinum	De Menor a Mayor
"Jolene" (with Chiquis)	2020	—	—	—	—	—	—	—	—	—		Playlist
"Tiempo Pa Olvidar" (with Abraham Mateo)	2020	—	—	36	—	—	28	—	—	—		Sigo a Lo Mío
"My Man"	2020	— (Note: "My Man" did not enter the Billboard Hot 100, but peaked at number 17 on the LyricFind Global.)	—	—	—	—	—	—	—	—		Non-album singles
"Otro Día Lluvioso" (with Juhn and Lenny Tavárez featuring Dalex)	2020	— (Note: "Otro Día Lluvioso" did not enter the Billboard Hot 100, but peaked at number 5 on the LyricFind U.S.)	—	—	—	—	—	—	—	—		Non-album singles
"No Drama" (with Ozuna)	2020	—	23	22	65	—	—	48	88	—		Non-album singles
"Te Va Bien" (with Kevvo and Arcángel featuring Darell)	2021	—	— (Note: "Te Va Bien" did not enter the Hot Latin Songs, but peaked at number 25 on the Latin Digital Song Sales.)	—	—	—	—	—	—	—	RIAA: Platinum (Latin)	Cotidiano
"Ram Pam Pam" (Note: "Ram Pam Pam" was first included on Natti Natasha's album Nattividad.) (with Natti Natasha)	2021	— (Note: "Ram Pam Pam" did not enter the US Billboard Hot 100, but peaked at number 20 on the Bubbling Under Hot 100 chart.)	12	1	6	— (Note: "Ram Pam Pam" did not enter the Bolivia Songs, but peaked at number 14 on the Monitor Latino Bolivia Airplay.)	5	16	—	52	RIAA: 4× Platinum (Latin); AMPROFON: Platinum+Gold; PROMUSICAE: 2× Platinum	Esquemas
"Fulanito" (with El Alfa)	2021	—	24	43	61	—	—	9	—	140	RIAA: 7× Platinum (Latin); AMPROFON: 2× Platinum+Gold; PROMUSICAE: 3× Platinum	Esquemas
"Only One" (with Khea and Julia Michaels featuring Di Genius)	2021	—	—	—	—	—	—	—	—	—		Non-album single
"Mal de Amores" (with Sofía Reyes)	2021	—	— (Note: "Mal de Amores" did not enter the Hot Latin Songs, but peaked at number 11 on the Latin Digital Song Sales.)	35	65	—	22	—	—	—	RIAA: Platinum (Latin)	Mal de Amores
"Baila Así" (with Play-N-Skillz and Thalía featuring Chiquis)	2021	—	— (Note: "Baila Así" did not enter the Hot Latin Songs, but peaked at number 24 on the Latin Digital Song Sales.)	—	—	—	—	—	—	—	RIAA: Gold (Latin)	Non-album single
"Pa Mis Muchachas" (with Christina Aguilera and Nicki Nicole featuring Nathy Peluso)	2021	—	37	— (Note: "Pa Mis Muchachas" did not enter the Latin Airplay, but peaked at number 18 on the Latin Pop Airplay.)	83	— (Note: "Pa Mis Muchachas" did not enter the Bolivia Songs, but peaked at number 17 on the Monitor Latino Bolivia Airplay.)	11	68	—	—	RIAA: Platinum (Latin)	Aguilera
"Bella Ciao"	2021	—	—	—	—	—	—	—	—	—		Non-album single
"Mamiii" (with Karol G)	2022	15	1	1	9	1	1	1	36	4	RIAA: 23× Platinum (Latin); AMPROFON: Diamond+4× Platinum; IFPI SWI: Gold; PROMUSICAE: 7× Platinum	Esquemas
"Ya Acabó" (with Marca MP)	2022	— (Note: "Ya Acabó" did not enter the Billboard Hot 100, but peaked at number 1 on the Bubbling Under Hot 100.)	7	34	—	—	13	—	—	—	AMPROFON: Platinum	Non-album single
"Bailé Con Mi Ex"	2022	—	41	1	49	—	2	—	—	—	RIAA: Platinum (Latin); AMPROFON: Gold	Esquemas
"La Loto" (with Tini and Anitta)	2022	—	— (Note: "La Loto" did not enter the Hot Latin Songs, but peaked at number 16 on the Latin Digital Song Sales.)	— (Note: "La Loto" did not enter the Latin Airplay, but peaked at number 8 on the Latin Pop Airplay.)	7	— (Note: "La Loto" did not enter the Bolivia Songs, but peaked at number 5 on the Monitor Latino Bolivia Airplay.)	23	78	—	197	AMPROFON: Gold; CAPIF: Platinum; PROMUSICAE: Gold	Cupido
"Amantes" (with Daviles de Novelda)	2022	—	—	—	—	—	—	74	—	—	PROMUSICAE: Platinum	Non-album singles
"Te Quiero Besar" (with Fuerza Regida)	2023	—	27	—	—	—	—	—	—	—		Non-album singles
"Arranca" (featuring Omega)	2023	—	— (Note: "Arranca" did not enter the Hot Latin Songs, but peaked at number 7 on the Latin Digital Song Sales.)	14	—	—	—	24	—	—	AMPROFON: Gold; PROMUSICAE: 2× Platinum	Non-album singles
"Chanel" (with Peso Pluma)	2023	55	8	34	—	—	9	—	—	46	RIAA: Platinum; RIAA: 15× Platinum (Latin); AMPROFON: Diamond+4× Platinum	Esquinas
"La Nena" (with Gabito Ballesteros)	2023	—	—	—	—	—	—	—	—	—		Esquinas
"Coming Your Way" (with Michaël Brun and Anne-Marie)	2023	— (Note: "Coming Your Way" did not enter the Billboard Hot 100, but peaked at number 49 on the Hot Dance/Electronic Songs.)	—	—	—	—	—	—	—	—		Fami Vol. 1
"2ndo Chance" (with Iván Cornejo)	2023	—	34	—	—	—	—	—	—	—		Esquinas
"Amigos" (with Bibi)	2023	—	—	—	—	—	—	—	—	—		Non-album single
"Por el Contrario" (with Ángela Aguilar and Leonardo Aguilar)	2023	— (Note: "Por el Contrario" did not enter the Billboard Hot 100, but peaked at number 18 on the Bubbling Under Hot 100.)	17	1	69	11	—	—	—	—	RIAA: Platinum; AMPROFON: 4× Platinum+Gold	Esquinas (Note: The Demo Version appeared on the Encuentros album.)
"Mercedes" (with Óscar Maydon)	2024	—	—	4	—	—	—	—	—	—	AMPROFON: Gold	Encuentros
"Como Diablos"	2024	—	—	—	—	—	—	—	—	—		Encuentros
"Bluetooth" (with Mariachi Divas)	2024	—	—	—	—	—	—	—	—	—		25 Aniversario
"Otro Capítulo"	2024	—	— (Note: "Otro Capítulo" did not enter the Hot Latin Songs, but peaked at number 5 on the Latin Digital Song Sales.)	—	—	—	—	—	—	—		Encuentros
"Que Haces" (with Manuel Turizo)	2025	—	35	18	54	—	—	44	—	—	PROMUSICAE: Platinum	Non-album single
"Marathon" (with Elkan)	2026	—	— (Note: "Marathon" did not enter the Hot Latin Songs, but peaked at number 11 on the Latin Digital Song Sales.)	—	—	—	—	—	—	—		Baraja Bendita
"Sorry Papi" (with Topic)	2026	—	—	— (Note: "Sorry Papi" did not enter the Latin Airplay, but peaked at number 16 on the Hot Latin Pop Songs.)	—	—	—	—	—	—		Non-album single
"Epa"	2026	—	47	— (Note: "Epa" did not enter the Latin Airplay, but peaked at number 17 on the Hot Latin Rhythm Songs.)	—	— (Note: "Epa" did not enter the Bolivia Songs, but peaked at number 12 on the Monitor Latino Bolivia Airplay.)	—	—	—	—		Baraja Bendita
"Mi Gran Amor" (with Santana)	2026	—	—	—	—	—	—	—	—	—		Non-album single
"Patrona"	2026	—	—	—	—	—	—	—	—	—		Baraja Bendita
"Te Olvido (La La)" (with Benny Blanco and Selena Gomez)	2026	—	14	— (Note: "Te Olvido (La La)" did not enter the Latin Airplay, but peaked at number 2 on the Hot Latin Pop Songs.)	30	— (Note: "Te Olvido (La La)" did not enter the Bolivia Songs, but peaked at number 16 on the Monitor Latino Bolivia Airplay.)	—	—	—	—		Hermoso
"—" denotes a recording that did not chart or was not released in that territory.

=== As featured artist ===
==== 2010s ====
List of singles released in the 2010s decade as featured artist, showing selected chart positions, certifications, and associated albums
Title	Year	Peak chart positions									Certifications	Album
Title	Year	US	US Latin	US Latin Pop	ARG	CAN	FRA	IRE	MEX	SPA	Certifications	Album
"Wish U Were Here" (Cody Simpson featuring Becky G)	2012	—	—	—	—	—	—	99	—	—		Paradise
"Oath" (Cher Lloyd featuring Becky G)	2012	73	—	—	—	58	—	—	—	—	RIAA: Gold	Sticks + Stones
"Die Young" (Remix) (Kesha featuring Juicy J, Wiz Khalifa and Becky G)	2012	—	—	—	—	—	—	—	—	—		Warrior
"Quiero Bailar (All Through the Night)" (3Ball MTY featuring Becky G)	2013	—	—	34	—	—	—	—	— (Note: "Quiero Bailar" did not enter the Mexico Airplay, but peaked at number 32 on the Mexico Espanol Airplay.)	—		Globall
"Como Tú No Hay Dos" (Thalía featuring Becky G)	2015	—	— (Note: "Como Tú No Hay Dos" did not enter the Hot Latin Songs, but peaked at number 24 on the Latin Digital Song Sales.)	20	—	—	—	—	—	—		Amore Mío
"Wild Mustang" (Yellow Claw and Cesqeaux featuring Becky G)	2015	—	—	—	—	—	—	—	—	—		Blood for Mercy
"Take It Off" (Lil Jon featuring Yandel and Becky G)	2016	— (Note: "Take It Off" did not enter the Billboard Hot 100, but peaked at number 37 on the Rhythmic Airplay.)	45	—	—	—	—	—	—	—		Non-album singles
"Si Una Vez (If I Once)" (Play-N-Skillz featuring Frankie J, Becky G and Kap G)	2017	— (Note: "Si Una Vez (If I Once)" did not enter the Billboard Hot 100, but peaked at number 11 on the Bubbling Under Hot 100.)	22	15	—	—	—	—	—	—		Non-album singles
"Que Nos Animemos" (Axel featuring Becky G)	2017	—	—	—	— (Note: "Que Nos Animemos" did not enter the Argentina Hot 100, but peaked at number 5 on the Argentina National Songs.)	—	—	—	— (Note: "Que Nos Animemos" did not enter the Mexico Airplay, but peaked at number 32 on the Mexico Espanol Airplay.)	—		Ser
"Mi Mala" (Remix) (Mau y Ricky and Karol G featuring Becky G, Leslie Grace and Lali)	2018	—	38	21	— (Note: "Mi Mala (Remix)" did not enter the Argentina Hot 100, but peaked at number 10 on the Monitor Latino Argentina Latin Airplay.)	—	—	—	—	57	CAPIF: Gold; PROMUSICAE: Gold	Para Aventuras y Curiosidades
"Mad Love" (Sean Paul and David Guetta featuring Becky G)	2018	— (Note: "Mad Love" did not enter the Billboard Hot 100, but peaked at number 7 on the Hot Dance/Electronic Songs.)	—	—	—	71	43	35	40	43	MC: Gold; PROMUSICAE: Platinum; SNEP: Platinum	Mad Love the Prequel (Note: This song only appears on the Limited edition bonus tracks of 7.)
"Don't Go" (Vice featuring Becky G and Mr. Eazi)	2018	—	—	—	—	—	—	—	—	—		Non-album singles
"Bubalu" (DJ Luian and Mambo Kingz featuring Anuel AA, Prince Royce and Becky G)	2018	—	22	—	74	—	—	—	— (Note: "Bubalu" did not enter the Mexico Airplay, but peaked at number 38 on the Mexico Espanol Airplay.)	12	RIAA: 24× Platinum (Latin); PROMUSICAE: 2× Platinum	Non-album singles
"Lost in the Middle of Nowhere" (Kane Brown featuring Becky G)	2019	— (Note: "Lost in the Middle of Nowhere" did not enter the US Billboard Hot 100, but peaked at number 24 on the Bubbling Under Hot 100 chart.)	13	—	—	—	—	—	—	—	RIAA: Gold; MC: Gold	Experiment
"Banana" (Anitta featuring Becky G)	2019	—	— (Note: "Banana" did not enter the Hot Latin Songs, but peaked at number 8 on the Latin Digital Song Sales.)	—	—	—	—	—	—	—		Kisses
"Rebota" (Remix) (Guaynaa and Nicky Jam, Farruko featuring Becky G and Sech)	2019	—	28	—	18	—	—	—	—	24	RIAA: Platinum (Latin); PROMUSICAE: Platinum	BRB Be Right Back
"Cómo No" (Akon featuring Becky G)	2019	—	— (Note: "Cómo No" did not enter the Hot Latin Songs, but peaked at number 7 on the Latin Digital Song Sales.)	—	—	—	—	—	— (Note: "Cómo No" did not enter the Mexico Airplay, but peaked at number 23 on the Mexico Popular Airplay.)	—		El Negreeto
"Chicken Noodle Soup" (J-Hope featuring Becky G)	2019	81	—	—	63	55	8	80	—	—	MC: Gold	Non-album singles
"Giants" (True Damage featuring Becky G, Keke Palmer, Soyeon, Duckwrth and Thutmose)	2019	— (Note: "Giants" did not enter the Billboard Hot 100, but peaked at number 19 on the related Hot R&B/Hip-Hop Digital Songs Sales.)	—	—	—	—	—	—	—	—		Non-album singles
"—" denotes a recording that did not chart or was not released in that territory.

==== 2020s ====
List of singles released in the 2020s decade as featured artist, showing selected chart positions, certifications, and associated albums
Title	Year	Peak chart positions						Certifications	Album
Title	Year	US	US Latin	US Latin Air	ARG	SPA	WW	Certifications	Album
"Vai Danada (Funk Total)" (PK featuring Becky G and Gabily)	2020	—	—	—	—	—	—		Non-album singles
"Mala" (Remix) (Pitbull featuring Becky G and De La Ghetto)	2020	—	—	—	—	—	—		Non-album singles
"Qué Maldición" (Remix) (Banda MS featuring Snoop Dogg and Becky G)	2020	—	—	—	—	—	—		Non-album singles
"Down to Miami" (Emotional Oranges featuring Becky G)	2021	—	—	—	—	—	—		Juicebox
"Wow Wow" (María Becerra featuring Becky G)	2021	—	— (Note: "Wow Wow" did not enter the Hot Latin Songs, but peaked at number 25 on the Latin Digital Song Sales.)	—	2	60	— (Note: "Wow Wow" did not enter the Billboard Global 200, but peaked at number 121 on the Global Excl. US.)	AMPROFON: Gold; PROMUSICAE: Gold	Animal
"Cough" (Kizz Daniel featuring Becky G)	2023	—	—	—	—	—	—		Maverick
"Tonight" (Black Eyed Peas and El Alfa featuring Becky G)	2024	— (Note: "Tonight" did not enter the Billboard Hot 100, but peaked at number 32 on the Hot Dance/Electronic Songs.)	—	46	—	—	—		Bad Boys: Ride or Die
"Candy Gum" (Emotional Oranges featuring Jessie Reyez and Becky G)	2025	—	—	—	—	—	—		Orenjii
"—" denotes a recording that did not chart or was not released in that territory.

=== Promotional singles ===
List of promotional singles, showing selected chart positions, certifications, and associated albums
Title	Year	Peak chart positions					Certifications	Album
Title	Year	US	BEL (FL) Tip	ECU	SWE Heat.	VEN	Certifications	Album
"Problem (The Monster Remix)" (featuring will.i.am)	2012	—	—	—	—	—		Hotel Transylvania
"Play It Again"	2013	— (Note: "Play It Again" did not enter the Billboard Hot 100, but peaked at number 28 on the Rhythmic Airplay.)	—	—	—	—		Play It Again
"Built for This"	2013	—	—	—	—	—		Play It Again
"You Love It"	2015	—	—	—	—	—		Non-album promotional singles
"Dum Dum" (with Kideko and Tinie Tempah)	2017	—	—	—	—	—		Non-album promotional singles
"Mal de La Cabeza" (with Mau y Ricky)	2018	—	—	83	—	82		Para Aventuras y Curiosidades
"Zooted" (with French Montana and Farruko)	2018	—	84	—	2	—		Non-album promotional singles
"Por un Amor" / "Cucurrucucú Paloma"	2018	—	—	—	—	—		Non-album promotional singles
"Mueve" (with Gianluca Vacchi and Nacho featuring MC Fioti)	2019	—	—	—	—	—		Non-album promotional singles
"24/7"	2019	—	—	—	—	—		Mala Santa
"Rotate" (with Burna Boy)	2021	—	—	—	—	—		Non-album promotional single
"You Belong"	2021	—	—	—	—	—		Spirit Untamed
"No Mienten"	2022	— (Note: "No Mienten" did not enter the Billboard Hot 100, but peaked at number 20 on the Hot Dance/Electronic Songs.)	—	—	—	—	RIAA: Gold (Latin); PROMUSICAE: Gold	Esquemas
"The Fire Inside" (Note: "The Fire Inside" was released as a standalone promotional single for the movie Flamin' Hot.)	2023	—	—	—	—	—		Non-album promotional single
"Querido Abuelo"	2023	—	—	—	—	—		Esquinas
"Boomerang"	2024	— (Note: "Boomerang" did not enter the Billboard Hot 100, but peaked at number 4 on the Latin Digital Song Sales.)	—	—	—	—		Non-album promotional single
"GomezX4"	2024	—	—	—	—	—		Encuentros
"Hablamos Mañana"	2025	— (Note: "Hablamos Mañana" did not enter the Billboard Hot 100, but peaked at number 13 on the Latin Digital Song Sales.)	—	—	—	—		Non-album promotional single
"Make It Count" (with Yeonjun and Myke Towers)	2026	—	—	—	—	—		2026 World Baseball Classic
"—" denotes a recording that did not chart or was not released in that territory.

== Other charted and certified songs ==
List of other charted and certified songs, showing selected chart positions, certifications, and associated albums
Title	Year	Peak chart positions								Certifications	Album
Title	Year	US	US Afro	US Latin	US Reg. Mex	ARG	SPA	SUR	UK	Certifications	Album
"Excuse My Rude" (Jessie J featuring Becky G)	2013	—	—	—	—	—	—	—	124		Alive
"Superstar" (Pitbull featuring Becky G)	2016	—	—	— (Note: "Superstar" did not enter the Hot Latin Songs, but peaked at number 20 on the Latin Rhythm Airplay.)	—	—	—	—	—		Non-album song
"Christmas C'mon" (Lindsey Stirling featuring Becky G)	2017	— (Note: "Christmas C'mon" did not enter the Billboard Hot 100, but peaked at number 21 on the Adult Contemporary.)	—	—	—	—	—	—	—		Warmer in the Winter
"Dura" (Remix) (Daddy Yankee featuring Natti Natasha, Becky G and Bad Bunny)	2018	—	—	—	—	11	1	—	—	PROMUSICAE: 2× Platinum	Non-album song
"Zona del Perreo" (with Daddy Yankee and Natti Natasha)	2022	—	—	32	—	—	73	—	—		Legendaddy
"On My Body" (with Tyla)	2024	—	10	—	—	—	—	—	—		Tyla
"Crisis" (with Tito Double P)	2024	—	—	— (Note: "Crisis" did not enter the Hot Latin Songs, but peaked at number 20 on the Latin Airplay.)	8	—	—	—	—		Encuentros
"Tek" (Davido featuring Becky G)	2025	—	17	—	—	—	—	—	—		5ive
"Hard Way" (Bia featuring Becky G)	2025	— (Note: "Hard Way" did not enter the Billboard Hot 100, but peaked at number 32 on the Rhythmic Airplay.)	—	—	—	—	—	—	—		Bianca
"Chula"	2026	—	—	— (Note: "Chula" did not enter the Hot Latin Songs, but peaked at number 11 on the Hot Latin Pop Songs.)	—	—	—	4	—		Baraja Bendita
"Mal Tiempo"	2026	—	—	— (Note: "Mal Tiempo" did not enter the Hot Latin Songs, but peaked at number 19 on the Hot Tropical Songs.)	—	—	—	—	—		Baraja Bendita
"—" denotes a recording that did not chart or was not released in that territory.

== See also ==
- List of songs recorded by Becky G
