= Becky G videography =

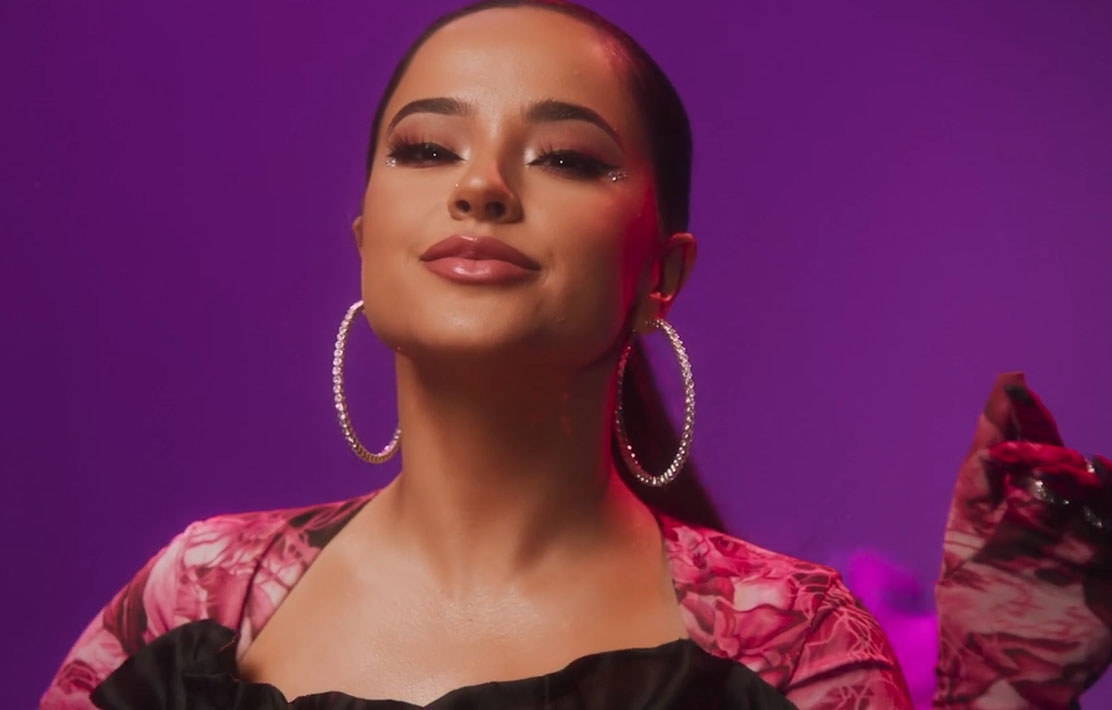
Gomez in 2022

Becky G is an American singer and actress. She began her acting career as a child in the short film El Tux (2008) and in the Discovery Channel television film La estación de la Calle Olvera (2008). Gomez also appeared in two episodes of Empire.

Gomez starred in Dean Israelite's superhero film Power Rangers, her character Trini is queer, being the first film superhero to be from the LGBTQ community. For her performance, she was nomination for Choice Movie Actress – Sci-Fi/Fantasy at the Teen Choice Awards. Gomez voiced Chloe in the animated fantasy comedy film Gnome Alone, alongside Josh Peck. Gomez then starred in science fiction adventure film A.X.L..

In addition to acting, she hosted and produced her En La Sala podcast from her living room, and hosted her own Facebook Watch talk show, titled Face to Face with Becky G. Gomez alongside Joe Jonas and Sean Bankhead to serve as judges and executive producers on the music competition series Becoming a Popstar.

Gomez starred in MGK's stoner comedy film Good Mourning. Gomez voiced Khaji-Da, an entity inside Jaime Reyes' Scarab, in the DC Studios film Blue Beetle. She was also the subject of the documentary film Rebbeca.

== Filmography ==
Key
†	Denotes films or shows that have not yet been released

=== Film ===
Title	Year	Role	Notes	Ref.
El Tux	2008	Claudia Gómez	Short film	
Power Rangers	2017	Trini Kwan		
Gnome Alone	2017	Chloe (voice)		
A.X.L.	2018	Sara Reyes		
Good Mourning	2022	Apple		
Blue Beetle	2023	Khaji-Da (voice)		
Rebbeca	2025	Herself	Documentary	
Karol G: Tomorrow Was Beautiful	2025	Herself	Documentary; cameo	
Baton †	TBA	TBA	Post-production	
House of Guerrero †	TBA	Maya Alvarado	Post-production	

=== Television ===
Title	Year	Role	Notes
La estación de la Calle Olvera	2008	Nina	Television film
La Voz Kids	2015	Herself (guest advisor)	4 episodes
Austin & Ally	2015	Herself	Episode: "Dancers & Ditzes"
Empire	2015	Valentina Galindo	2 episodes
Latin American Music Awards	2017–2018, 2024	Herself (host)	Television special
MasterChef	2018	Herself	Guest star; 1 episode
La Voz Argentina	2018	Herself (guest advisor)	3 episodes
Activate: The Global Citizen Movement	2019	Herself	Docuseries; episode "Eradicating Extreme Poverty"
2019 MTV Europe Music Awards	2019	Herself (host)	Television special
Together at Home	2020	Herself	Television special
Everybody Loves Natti	2021	Herself	Docuseries; episode: "All in the Family"
Becoming a Popstar	2022	Herself (judge)	Also executive producer
A Tiny Audience	2022	Herself	Episode: "A Tiny Audience: Becky G"
2022 MTV MIAW Awards	2022	Herself (host)	Television special
Angel City	2023	Herself	Miniseries; 2 episodes
RuPaul's Drag Race	2024	Herself (guest judge)	Episode: "Queen Choice Awards"
Faces of Music	2025	Herself	Docuseries; episode: "Faces of Music: Becky G"
La Voz Kids	2026	Herself (guest advisor)	3 episodes

=== Web ===
Title	Year	Role	Notes	Ref.
Drop the Mic with Becky G	2014	Herself	Web docu-series	
Teens Wanna Know	2014	Herself	Web docu-series; episode: "DJ Young Slade & Flips Audio Headphones Review"	
Mahomie Madness	2014	Herself	Web docu-series; episode: "Austin Mahone Shows His Tour Bus and Hangs with Becky G"	
En La Sala	2020	Herself (host)	Executive producer; podcast; 10 episodes	
Face to Face with Becky G	2021	Herself (host)	Executive producer; Facebook Watch talk show	
Jay Shetty Podcast	2023	Herself	Episode: "Becky G: On Coming to Terms with Her Identity and Radical Authenticity"	
The Becky G Show	2024	Herself (host)	Apple Music Radio	
Celebrity Substitute	2026	Herself	Episode: "Becky G Teaches Kids what it Means to Be an Iconic Latina"	
Call Her Daddy	2026	Herself	Episode: "Becky G: Cheating & People Pleasing"	
Brooklyn Coffee Shop	2026	Herself	Episode: "Becky G visita el café"	
Hot Ones	2026	Herself	Episode: "Becky G Conquers the Heat while Eating Spicy Wings"	

=== Commercials ===
Company	Year	Promoting	Title	Theme song(s)
CoverGirl	2013–2015	Cosmetics	"Flamed Out Mascara" · "LashBlast" · "TruBlend: One Tru Three"	"Can't Get Enough" (2013)
Truth Initiative	2015	Tobacco control	"Left Swipe Dat"	"Left Swipe Dat"
Xfinity	2017, 2022	Telecommunications	"Supersónico" · "What's It Like" · "Get It All: $50"	—N/a
Jack in the Box	2020	Food	"New Chicken Dance"	—N/a
Oreo	2021	Sandwich cookie	"Home Sweet Home"	—N/a
Michelob ULTRA	2022	Beer	"Golden"	—N/a
TRESemmé	2023	Hair care	"Dimension"	—N/a
Vita Coco	2023	Coconut water	—N/a	—N/a
Cheetos	2023	Snack	"Fingertip Sponsorship Deal"	—N/a
Fabletics	2025	Sportswear	"Becky G x Fabletics" · "Full-Flavor Fits"	—N/a
Mountain Dew	2025	Soft drink	"Kiss From a Lime"	"Kiss from a Rose"
Garnier	2025	Hair serum	"Put It to the Test"	—N/a
Lenovo	2026	Technology	"Your Club Your Canvas"	"Marathon"
Alani Nu	2026	Energy drink flavor	"Center Stage"	—N/a
Major League Baseball	2026	2026 World Baseball Classic	"Expect Everything"	—N/a
UGG	2026	Boots	"UGG & KISSES with Willy Chavarria"	—N/a
Guess	2026	Clothing	"The B Jean with Becky G"	—N/a

== Music videos ==
=== As lead artist ===
Title	Year	Performer(s)	Director(s)	Ref.
"Problem (The Monster Remix)"	2012	will.i.am	P. R. Brown	
"Becky from the Block"	2013	—N/a	James Defina and Chris Velona	
"Play It Again"	2013	—N/a	Jess Holzworth	
"Built For This"	2013	—N/a	Becky G	
"Can't Get Enough"	2014	Pitbull	Harper Smith	
"Shower"	2014	—N/a	Tim Nackashi	
"Can't Stop Dancin'"	2014	—N/a	Hannah Lux Davis	
"Lovin' So Hard"	2015	—N/a	Andrew Molina	
"Break a Sweat"	2015	—N/a	Alexander Federic	
"Sola"	2016	—N/a	Frank Borin and Becky G	
"Mangú"	2016	—N/a	Frank Borin and Becky G	
"Todo Cambió"	2017	—N/a	Daniel Durán	
"Mayores"	2017	Bad Bunny	Daniel Durán	
"Díganle" +(Remix version with CNCO)	2017	Leslie Grace	Mike Ho	
"Ya Es Hora"	2018	Ana Mena and De la Ghetto	Mauri D. Galiano	
"Sin Pijama"	2018	Natti Natasha	Daniel Durán	
"Zooted"	2018	French Montana and Farruko	Daniel Durán	
"Cuando Te Besé" +(Vertical Video)	2018	Paulo Londra	Paloma Valencia	
"Cuando Te Besé" +(Vertical Video)	2018	Paulo Londra	36 grados	
"Pienso en Ti"	2018	Joss Favela	Kenneth O' Brien	
"Booty"	2018	C. Tangana	Pablo Larcuen	
"LBD"	2019	—N/a	Lauren Dunn	
"Green Light Go"	2019	—N/a	Alex Alvga	
"La Respuesta"	2019	Maluma	Daniel Durán	
"Next to You"	2019	Digital Farm Animals and Rvssian	Daniel Durán	
"Que Me Baile"	2019	ChocQuibTown	Daniel Durán	
"Dollar"	2019	Myke Towers	Eif Rivera	
"Secrets"	2019	—N/a	Philip R. Lopez	
Mala Santa (Álbum Visuals) (Note: Although featured in some songs on the album, Sech, Darell, Mau y Ricky, Dalex, Zion & Lennox and Farruko do not appear in the visuals for their respective tracks.)	2019	—N/a	Daniel Durán and Pedro Araujo	
"Perdiendo la Cabeza"	2020	Carlos Rivera and Pedro Capó	Nuno Gomez	
"They Ain't Ready"	2020	—N/a	Daniel Durán	
"Muchacha"	2020	Gente de Zona	Joaquín Cambre	
"Tiempo Pa Olvidar"	2020	Abraham Mateo	Mike Ho	
"Jolene"	2020	Chiquis	Adán Chávez and Julio Abad	
"My Man"	2020	—N/a	Pedro Paulo Araujo	
"Otro Día Lluvioso"	2020	Juhn, Lenny Tavárez and Dalex	José Emilio Sagaró	
"No Drama" +(Cumbia Version) (Note: Music video was only made available on the social media site Facebook)	2020	Ozuna	Mike Ho	
"No Drama" +(Cumbia Version)	2020	—N/a	Daniel Durán	
"La Curiosidad" (Red Remix)	2020	Various (Note: Jay Wheeler, Myke Towers, DJ Nelson, Arcángel, De la Ghetto, Zion & Lennox and Brray.)	Nuno Gomez	
"Te Va Bien"	2021	Kevvo, Arcángel and Darell	both	
"Ram Pam Pam" +(Remix version with Vanessa Mai)	2021	Natti Natasha	Daniel Durán	
"Fulanito"	2021	El Alfa	both	
"Only One"	2021	Khea, Julia Michaels and Di Genius	Navs	
"Mal de Amores"	2021	Sofía Reyes	Mike Ho	
"Pa Mis Muchachas"	2021	Christina Aguilera, Nicki Nicole and Nathy Peluso	Alexandre Moors	
"Bella Ciao"	2021	—N/a	Megan Gámez	
"Baila Así" +(Alternative Video)	2022	Play-N-Skillz, Thalía and Chiquis	Michael Garcia	
"Zona del Perreo"	2022	Daddy Yankee and Natti Natasha	Fernando Lugo	
"Mamiii" (Note: Gomez does not appear in the official video.)	2022	Karol G	Mike Ho	
"Ya Acabó"	2022	Marca MP	Daniel Durán	
"Bailé Con Mi Ex"	2022	—N/a	Pedro Artola	
"La Loto" +(Alternative Video)	2022	Tini and Anitta	Diego Peskins and Daniel Durán	
"Amantes"	2022	Daviles de Novelda	Zazo Canvas	
"Te Quiero Besar"	2023	Fuerza Regida	Miguel Lopez	
"Arranca"	2023	Omega	Karla Read	
"Chanel"	2023	Peso Pluma	Ricky Álvarez	
"La Nena"	2023	Gabito Ballesteros	Santiago Lafee	
"Coming Your Way"	2023	Michaël Brun and Anne-Marie	Andrea Saavedra	
"Querido Abuelo"	2023	—N/a	Becky G and Elias Lopez	
"2ndo Chance" (Performance Video)	2023	Iván Cornejo	Elias Lopez	
"Amigos"	2023	Bibi	Mutant	
"The Fire Inside"	2023	—N/a	Eva Longoria	
"Por el Contrario" (Performance Video)	2023	Ángela Aguilar and Leonardo Aguilar	Karla Read	
"Mercedes"	2024	Óscar Maydon	Jared Malik Royal	
"Como Diablos"	2024	—N/a	Leo Aguirre	
"Otro Capítulo"	2024	—N/a	Pietro Biz Biasia	
"GomezX4"	2024	—N/a	Unknown	
"Que Haces"	2025	Manuel Turizo	Joey Breese and Joey Barba	
"Marathon"	2026	Elkan	Alex Thurmond	
"Sorry Papi"	2026	Topic	Mats Bohle and Julian Kleinert	
"Epa"	2026	—N/a	Olivia De Camps	
"Patrona"	2026	—N/a	Pedro Artola	
"Te Olvido (La La)"	2026	Benny Blanco and Selena Gomez	Stillz	
"Mi Gran Amor"	2026	Santana	Txema Rosique	

=== As featured artist ===
Title	Year	Performer(s)	Director(s)	Ref.
"Wish U Were Here"	2012	Cody Simpson	Cameron Duddy	
"Oath"	2012	Cher Lloyd	Hannah Lux Davis	
"Quiero Bailar (All Through the Night)"	2014	3Ball MTY	José Serrano Montoya	
"Como Tú No Hay Dos"	2015	Thalía	Hannah Lux Davis	
"Take It Off"	2016	Lil Jon and Yandel	Daniel Durán	
"Que Nos Animemos"	2017	Axel	Juan Ripari	
"Christmas C'mon"	2017	Lindsey Stirling	Andrew Joffe	
"Mi Mala" (Remix)	2018	Mau y Ricky, Karol G, Leslie Grace and Lali	Daniel Durán and David Bohorquez	
"Mad Love"	2018	Sean Paul and David Guetta	Sarah McColgan	
"Bubalu"	2018	DJ Luian, Mambo Kingz, Anuel AA and Prince Royce	Eif Rivera	
"Lost in the Middle of Nowhere" (Spanish Remix) +(English Version) (Note: A second version was released ahead of the official music video, featuring behind-the-scenes footage from its production.)	2019	Kane Brown	Alex Alvga	
"Banana"	2019	Anitta	Lula Carvalho	
"Un Mundo Ideal"	2019	Zayn	Philip Andelman	
"Cómo No"	2019	Akon	Marc Klasfeld	
"Chicken Noodle Soup"	2019	J-Hope	Yongseok Choi	
"Mala" (Remix)	2020	Pitbull and De la Ghetto	David Rousseau and Bobby Viera	
"Qué Maldición" (Remix)	2020	Banda MS and Snoop Dogg	Jorge G. Camarena and Cristobal G. Camarena	
"Down to Miami"	2021	Emotional Oranges	Bo Mirhosseni	
"Wow Wow"	2021	María Becerra	Squid and Julián Levy	
"Tonight"	2024	Black Eyed Peas and El Alfa	Adil & Bilall	
"Candy Gum"	2025	Emotional Oranges and Jessie Reyez	Zhamak	

=== Guest appearances ===
Title	Year	Performer(s)	Director(s)	Ref.
"Where Is the Love?"	2016	Black Eyed Peas featuring The World	will.i.am	
"Las Nenas"	2021	Natti Natasha, Cazzu, Fariana and La Duraca	Daniel Durán	
"La Baby"	2023	Tainy, Daddy Yankee, Feid and Sech	Elliot Muscat, Sho Mitsui, Jack Peros and Nick Collini	
