= List of awards and nominations received by Becky G =

Becky G awards and nominations
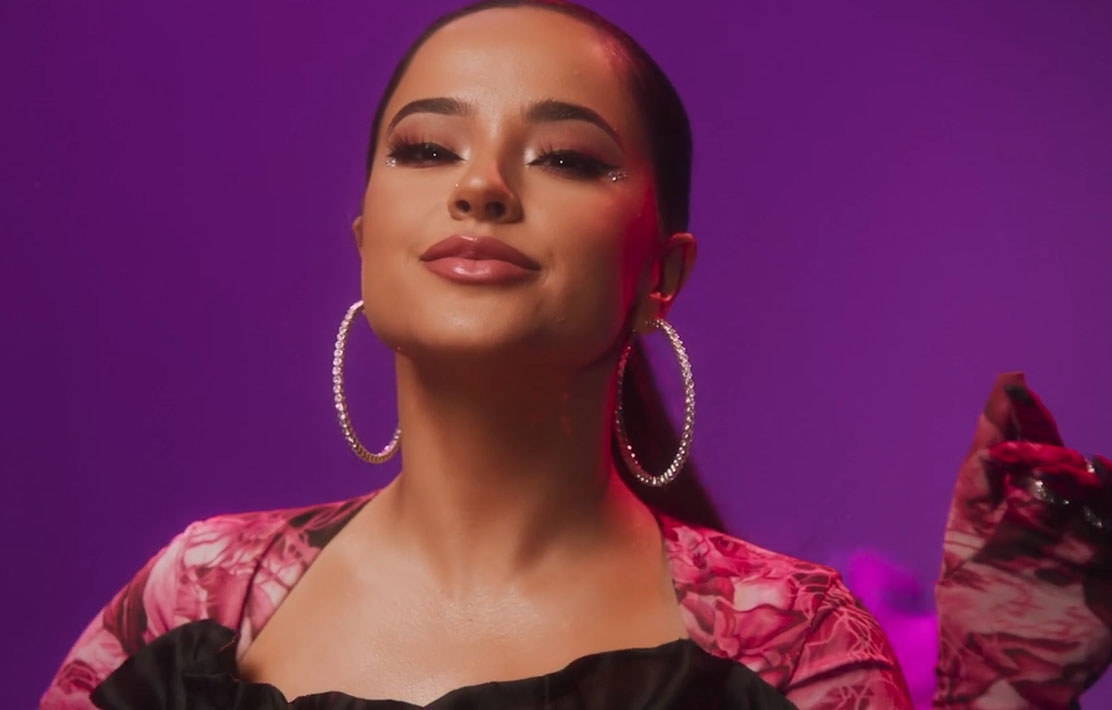
- Gomez at the 2022 MTV Millennial Awards
Awards and nominations
Award	Wins	Nominations
American Music Awards	3	5
Billboard Latin Music Awards	1	22
Billboard Music Awards	0	2
Billboard Women in Music	1	1
Latin American Music Awards	9	20
Latin Grammy Awards	1	8

Totals (Note: Certain award groups do not simply award one winner. They acknowledge several different recipients, have runners-up, and have third place. Since this is a specific recognition and is different from losing an award, runner-up mentions are considered wins in this award tally. For simplification and to avoid errors, each award in this list has been presumed to have had a prior nomination.)
- Wins: 60
- Nominations: 248

American singer, songwriter, and actress Becky G has received many awards and nominations throughout her career. Throughout the late 2010s, she released a number of singles and collaborations, earning further nominations at the Billboard Latin Music, Latin American Music, Lo Nuestro, and Premios Juventud awards ceremonies. Gomez was honored by the Inspira Award from the Hispanic Heritage Foundation in 2015, and received the Latin Recording Academy as one of the Leading Ladies of Entertainment in 2018. In 2019, Gomez released her debut studio album, Mala Santa, and received the Extraordinary Evolution Award at Latin American Music Awards.

Her collaboration with Karol G on the single "Mamiii" received four Billboard Latin Music and Latin Grammy Award for Best Urban Song nominations, and winning two accolades at the Latin American Music Awards. Her song "Por el Contrario" earned a Latin Grammy Award nomination for Best Regional Mexican Song.

Gomez was honored as Billboard's Impact Award in 2023, and Global Impact Award in 2026. She was named to Forbes 30 Under 30 (2023) and Time 100 (2025).

== Major associations ==
=== Grammy Awards ===
Year	Category	Nominated work	Result	Ref.
Latin Grammy Awards
2018	Leading Ladies of Entertainment	Becky G	Honored	
2022	Record of the Year	"Pa Mis Muchachas" (with Christina Aguilera and Nicki Nicole featuring Nathy Peluso)	Nominated	
2022	Song of the Year	"Pa Mis Muchachas" (with Christina Aguilera and Nicki Nicole featuring Nathy Peluso)	Nominated	
2022	Best Urban Performance	"Pa Mis Muchachas" (with Christina Aguilera and Nicki Nicole featuring Nathy Peluso)	Nominated	
2022	Album of the Year (Note: For her work as the featured artist on "Pa Mis Muchachas".)	Aguilera	Nominated	
2022	Best Urban Song	"Mamiii" (with Karol G)	Nominated	
2024	Best Regional Mexican Song	"Por el Contrario" (with Ángela Aguilar and Leonardo Aguilar)	Nominated	
2026	Song of the Year	"Mi Gran Amor" (with Santana)	Nominated	

== Miscellaneous awards ==
Name of the award ceremony, year presented, recipient of the award, category and result
Award	Year (Note: Indicates the year of ceremony. Each year is linked to the article about the awards held that year, wherever possible.)	Category	Recipient(s)	Result	Ref.
American Music Awards	2020	Favorite Female Latin Artist	Becky G	Won	
American Music Awards	2021	Favorite Female Latin Artist	Becky G	Won	
American Music Awards	2022	Favorite Female Latin Artist	Becky G	Nominated	
American Music Awards	2022	Favorite Latin Song	"Mamiii" (with Karol G)	Nominated	
American Music Awards	2025	Favorite Female Latin Artist	Becky G	Won	
Anthem Awards	2024	Diversity, Equity & Inclusion – News & Journalism	Tiny Desk Concerts' 'El Tiny' Takeover – NPR	Gold	
ASCAP Latin Music Awards	2019	Winning Songs (Note: Awards and nominations Gomez has received as songwriter.)	"Sin Pijama"	Won	
ASCAP Latin Music Awards	2020	Winning Songs	"Bubalu"	Won	
ASCAP Latin Music Awards	2022	Winning Songwriters & Publishers	"Ram Pam Pam" (with Natti Natasha)	Won	
ASCAP Latin Music Awards	2023	Winning Songwriters & Publishers	"Mamiii"	Won	
ASCAP Latin Music Awards	2024	Winning Songwriters & Publishers	"Chanel"	Won	
Billboard Latin Music Awards	2015	Crossover Artist of the Year	Becky G	Nominated	
Billboard Latin Music Awards	2017	Hot Latin Songs Artist of the Year – Female	Becky G	Nominated	
Billboard Latin Music Awards	2018	Hot Latin Songs Artist of the Year – Female	Becky G	Nominated	
Billboard Latin Music Awards	2019	Hot Latin Songs Artist of the Year – Female	Becky G	Nominated	
Billboard Latin Music Awards	2020	Social Artist of the Year	Becky G	Nominated	
Billboard Latin Music Awards	2020	Hot Latin Songs Artist of the Year – Female	Becky G	Nominated	
Billboard Latin Music Awards	2020	Top Latin Albums Artist of the Year – Female	Becky G	Nominated	
Billboard Latin Music Awards	2021	Top Latin Albums Artist of the Year – Female	Becky G	Nominated	
Billboard Latin Music Awards	2022	Hot Latin Song of the Year	"Mamiii" (with Karol G)	Nominated	
Billboard Latin Music Awards	2022	Hot Latin Song of the Year – Vocal Event	"Mamiii" (with Karol G)	Won	
Billboard Latin Music Awards	2022	Airplay Song of the Year	"Mamiii" (with Karol G)	Nominated	
Billboard Latin Music Awards	2022	Latin Pop Song of the Year	"Mamiii" (with Karol G)	Nominated	
Billboard Latin Music Awards	2022	Latin Rhythm Airplay Song of the Year	"Mamiii" (with Karol G)	Nominated	
Billboard Latin Music Awards	2022	Hot Latin Songs Artist of the Year – Female	Becky G	Nominated	
Billboard Latin Music Awards	2022	Top Latin Albums Artist of the Year – Female	Becky G	Nominated	
Billboard Latin Music Awards	2022	Latin Pop Artist of the Year	Becky G	Nominated	
Billboard Latin Music Awards	2022	Latin Pop Album of the Year	Esquemas	Nominated	
Billboard Latin Music Awards	2023	Hot Latin Songs Artist of the Year – Female	Becky G	Nominated	
Billboard Latin Music Awards	2023	Top Latin Albums Artist of the Year – Female	Becky G	Nominated	
Billboard Latin Music Awards	2023	Latin Pop Artist of the Year	Becky G	Nominated	
Billboard Latin Music Awards	2024	Top Latin Albums Artist of the Year – Female	Becky G	Nominated	
Billboard Latin Music Awards	2025	Top Latin Albums Artist of the Year – Female	Becky G	Nominated	
Billboard Latin Music Awards	2026	Top Latin Albums Artist of the Year – Female	Becky G	Nominated	
Billboard Latin Music Awards	2026	Latin Pop Album of the Year	Baraja Bendita	Nominated	
Billboard Latin Women in Music	2026	Global Impact Award	Becky G	Won	
Billboard Music Awards	2018	Top Latin Song	"Mayores" (with Bad Bunny)	Nominated	
Billboard Music Awards	2021	Top Latin Female Artist	Becky G	Nominated	
Billboard Women in Music	2023	Impact Award	Becky G	Won	
BreakTudo Awards	2018	Latin Artist	Becky G	Nominated	
BreakTudo Awards	2021	Latin Artist	Becky G	Nominated	
BreakTudo Awards	2021	Latin Hit	"Ram Pam Pam" (with Natti Natasha)	Nominated	
BreakTudo Awards	2022	Latin Artist	Becky G	Nominated	
BreakTudo Awards	2022	Latin Hit	"Mamiii" (with Karol G)	Nominated	
Gold Derby Awards	2022	Best Latin Artist	Becky G	Nominated	
Gold Derby Awards	2023	Best Latin Artist	Becky G	Nominated	
Harvard Foundation	2025	Artist of the Year	Becky G	Won	
Heat Latin Music Awards	2019	Best Female Artist	Becky G	Nominated	
Heat Latin Music Awards	2020	Best Female Artist	Becky G	Nominated	
Hispanic Heritage Awards	2015	Inspira Award	Becky G	Won	
Hollywood Music in Media Awards	2023	Original Song — Feature Film	"The Fire Inside" (from Flamin' Hot)	Nominated	
iHeartRadio Music Awards	2023	Latin Pop/Reggaeton Song of the Year	"Mamiii" (with Karol G)	Won	
iHeartRadio Music Awards	2025	Favorite Surprise Guest	Becky G (Note: Peso Pluma bringing out Becky G on Éxodo Tour.)	Nominated	
iHeartRadio Music Awards	2026	Favorite On Screen	Rebecca	Nominated	
Imagen Awards	2024	Best Voice-Over Actor – Feature Film	Blue Beetle	Nominated	
Latin American Music Awards	2016	Favorite Pop/Rock Female Artist	Becky G	Won	
Latin American Music Awards	2018	Song of the Year	"Mayores" (with Bad Bunny)	Nominated	
Latin American Music Awards	2018	Favorite Urban Song	"Mayores" (with Bad Bunny)	Won	
Latin American Music Awards	2018	Favorite Female Artist	Becky G	Won	
Latin American Music Awards	2019	Favorite Female Artist	Becky G	Won	
Latin American Music Awards	2019	Favorite Pop/Rock Song	"Lost in the Middle of Nowhere" (Spanish Remix) (Kane Brown featuring Becky G)	Nominated	
Latin American Music Awards	2019	Favorite Video	"La Respuesta" (with Maluma)	Nominated	
Latin American Music Awards	2019	Extraordinary Evolution Award	Becky G	Won	
Latin American Music Awards	2021	Favorite Female Artist	Becky G	Nominated	
Latin American Music Awards	2022	Social Artist of the Year	Becky G	Nominated	
Latin American Music Awards	2023	Artist of the Year	Becky G	Nominated	
Latin American Music Awards	2023	Favorite Pop Artist	Becky G	Nominated	
Latin American Music Awards	2023	Song of the Year	"Mamiii" (with Karol G)	Won	
Latin American Music Awards	2023	Collaboration of the Year	"Mamiii" (with Karol G)	Won	
Latin American Music Awards	2023	Best Collaboration – Pop/Urban	"Mamiii" (with Karol G)	Won	
Latin American Music Awards	2023	Album of the Year	Esquemas	Nominated	
Latin American Music Awards	2023	Favorite Pop Album	Esquemas	Nominated	
Latin American Music Awards	2023	Favorite Pop Song	"Bailé Con Mi Ex"	Nominated	
Latin American Music Awards	2023	Best Collaboration – Regional Mexican	"Ya Acabó" (with Marca MP)	Won	
Latin American Music Awards	2024	Best Collaboration – Urban	"Arranca" (featuring Omega)	Nominated	
Latino Entertainment Journalists Association Film Awards (Note: These awards are administered by the Latino Entertainment Journalists Association.)	2024	Best Song	"The Fire Inside" (from Flamin' Hot)	Nominated	
Latinos in Sports Awards	2025	Pionera Award	Becky G	Won	
Lo Nuestro Awards	2015	Pop Female Artist of the Year	Becky G	Nominated	
Lo Nuestro Awards	2019	Female Urban Artist of the Year	Becky G	Nominated	
Lo Nuestro Awards	2019	Remix of the Year	"Mi Mala" (Remix) (Mau y Ricky and Karol G featuring Becky G, Leslie Grace and Lali)	Nominated	
Lo Nuestro Awards	2019	Remix of the Year	"Dura" (Remix) (Daddy Yankee featuring Natti Natasha, Becky G and Bad Bunny)	Nominated	
Lo Nuestro Awards	2019	Urban Song of the Year	"Dura" (Remix) (Daddy Yankee featuring Natti Natasha, Becky G and Bad Bunny)	Nominated	
Lo Nuestro Awards	2019	Urban Song of the Year	"Sin Pijama" (with Natti Natasha)	Won	
Lo Nuestro Awards	2019	Urban Collaboration of the Year	"Sin Pijama" (with Natti Natasha)	Won	
Lo Nuestro Awards	2019	Urban Collaboration of the Year	"Dura" (Remix) (Daddy Yankee featuring Natti Natasha, Becky G and Bad Bunny)	Nominated	
Lo Nuestro Awards	2020	Female Urban Artist of the Year	Becky G	Nominated	
Lo Nuestro Awards	2021	Pop Collaboration of the Year	"Muchacha" (with Gente de Zona)	Nominated	
Lo Nuestro Awards	2021	Pop Collaboration of the Year	"Perdiendo la Cabeza" (with Carlos Rivera and Pedro Capó)	Nominated	
Lo Nuestro Awards	2021	Pop Song of the Year	"Perdiendo la Cabeza" (with Carlos Rivera and Pedro Capó)	Nominated	
Lo Nuestro Awards	2021	Female Urban Artist of the Year	Becky G	Nominated	
Lo Nuestro Awards	2022	Female Urban Artist of the Year	Becky G	Nominated	
Lo Nuestro Awards	2022	Urban Collaboration of the Year	"Fulanito" (with El Alfa)	Nominated	
Lo Nuestro Awards	2023	Artist of the Year	Becky G	Nominated	
Lo Nuestro Awards	2023	Female Urban Artist of the Year	Becky G	Nominated	
Lo Nuestro Awards	2023	Album of the Year	Esquemas	Nominated	
Lo Nuestro Awards	2023	Urban Album of the Year	Esquemas	Nominated	
Lo Nuestro Awards	2023	Song of the Year	"Mamiii" (with Karol G)	Won	
Lo Nuestro Awards	2023	Urban/Pop Song of the Year	"Mamiii" (with Karol G)	Nominated	
Lo Nuestro Awards	2023	Remix of the Year	"La Ducha" (Remix) (Elena Rose and María Becerra featuring Greeicy, Becky G and Tini)	Nominated	
Lo Nuestro Awards	2023	Urban Dance/Pop Song of the Year	"Baila Así" (with Play-N-Skillz, Thalía featuring Chiquis)	Nominated	
Lo Nuestro Awards	2023	Urban Dance/Pop Song of the Year	"Bailé Con Mi Ex"	Nominated	
Lo Nuestro Awards	2024	The Perfect Mix of the Year	"Chanel" (with Peso Pluma)	Nominated	
Lo Nuestro Awards	2024	Female Urban Artist of the Year	Becky G	Nominated	
Lo Nuestro Awards	2024	Urban/Pop Collaboration of the Year	"La Loto" (with Tini and Anitta)	Nominated	
Lo Nuestro Awards	2025	Song of the Year	"Por el Contrario" (with Ángela Aguilar and Leonardo Aguilar)	Nominated	
Lo Nuestro Awards	2025	The Perfect Mix of the Year	"Por el Contrario" (with Ángela Aguilar and Leonardo Aguilar)	Nominated	
Lo Nuestro Awards	2025	Mexican Music – Song of the Year	"Por el Contrario" (with Ángela Aguilar and Leonardo Aguilar)	Nominated	
Lo Nuestro Awards	2025	Mariachi/Ranchera Song of the Year	"Por el Contrario" (with Ángela Aguilar and Leonardo Aguilar)	Won	
Lo Nuestro Awards	2025	Album of the Year	Esquinas	Nominated	
Lo Nuestro Awards	2025	Mexican Music – Album of the Year	Esquinas	Nominated	
Lo Nuestro Awards	2025	Best Female Combination	"Cuidadito" (with Chiquis)	Nominated	
Lo Nuestro Awards	2025	Crossover Collaboration of the Year	"Tonight" (Black Eyed Peas and El Alfa featuring Becky G)	Nominated	
Lo Nuestro Awards	2025	Mexican Music – Collaboration of the Year	"Mercedes" (with Óscar Maydon)	Nominated	
Lo Nuestro Awards	2025	Mexican Music – Fusion of the Year	"Mercedes" (with Óscar Maydon)	Nominated	
Lo Nuestro Awards	2026	Pop/Urban Collaboration of the Year	"Que Haces" (with Manuel Turizo)	Won	
Lo Nuestro Awards	2026	Mexican Music – Song of the Year	"Otro Capítulo"	Nominated	
Lo Nuestro Awards	2026	Mexican Music – Collaboration of the Year	"Crisis" (with Tito Double P)	Nominated	
Lo Nuestro Awards	2026	Mexican Music – Album of the Year	Encuentros	Nominated	
Los 40 Music Awards	2021	Best Act	Becky G	Nominated	
Los 40 Music Awards	2022	Best Act	Becky G	Nominated	
Los 40 Music Awards	2022	Best Album	Esquemas	Nominated	
Los 40 Music Awards	2022	Best Latin Video	"Mamiii" (with Karol G)	Nominated	
Los 40 Music Awards	2023	Best Collaboration	"Arranca" (featuring Omega)	Nominated	
Maestro Cares Foundation	2026	Voice of Change Award	Becky G	Won	
MTV Europe Music Awards	2019	Best Pop	Becky G	Nominated	
MTV Europe Music Awards	2022	Best Latin	Becky G	Nominated	
MTV MIAW Awards	2019	MIAW Artist	Becky G	Nominated	
MTV MIAW Awards	2019	Music Ship of the Year	"Cuando Te Besé" (with Paulo Londra)	Nominated	
MTV MIAW Awards	2022	MIAW Artist	Becky G	Nominated	
MTV MIAW Awards	2022	Viral Anthem	"Mamiii" (with Karol G)	Won	
MTV MIAW Awards	2023	Music Ship of the Year	"Chanel" (with Peso Pluma)	Nominated	
MTV MIAW Awards Brazil	2019	Clip of the Year	"Banana" (Anitta featuring Becky G)	Won	
MTV Video Music Awards	2022	Best Latin	"Mamiii" (with Karol G)	Nominated	
NRJ Music Awards	2023	International Breakthrough of the Year	Becky G	Nominated	
People's Choice Awards	2019	Latin Artist of the Year	Becky G	Won	
People's Choice Awards	2020	Latin Artist of the Year	Becky G	Won	
People's Choice Awards	2021	Latin Artist of the Year	Becky G	Nominated	
People's Choice Awards	2022	Latin Artist of the Year	Becky G	Won	
People's Choice Awards	2024	Female Latin Artist of the Year	Becky G	Nominated	
Prêmio Jovem Brasileiro	2019	Me Gusta	"Banana" (Anitta featuring Becky G)	Nominated	
Premios Gardel	2019	Collaboration of the Year	"Cuando Te Besé" (with Paulo Londra)	Nominated	
Premios Gardel	2019	Best Urban/Trap Song or Album	"Cuando Te Besé" (with Paulo Londra)	Nominated	
Premios Gardel	2019	Best Urban/Trap Collaboration	"Cuando Te Besé" (with Paulo Londra)	Won	
Premios Gardel	2022	Best Urban Collaboration	"Wow Wow" (María Becerra featuring Becky G)	Nominated	
Premios Gardel	2023	Best Urban Collaboration	"La Loto" (with Tini and Anitta)	Nominated	
Premios Juventud	2013	Revelation Young	Becky G	Nominated	
Premios Juventud	2015	Mi Artista Pop/Rock	Becky G	Nominated	
Premios Juventud	2015	Favorite Hit	"Shower"	Won	
Premios Juventud	2016	Mi Artista Pop/Rock	Becky G	Nominated	
Premios Juventud	2016	Mi Tuitero Favorito	Becky G	Nominated	
Premios Juventud	2017	Best Fashionista	Becky G	Nominated	
Premios Juventud	2019	Sick Dance Routine	"La Respuesta" (with Maluma)	Nominated	
Premios Juventud	2019	This Is a BTS	"Lost in the Middle of Nowhere" (Kane Brown featuring Becky G)	Nominated	
Premios Juventud	2019	Best Social Artist	Becky G	Nominated	
Premios Juventud	2019	Best Scroll Stopper	Becky G	Nominated	
Premios Juventud	2019	Shoe-Aholic	Becky G	Nominated	
Premios Juventud	2019	Best Couple	Becky G and Sebastian Lletget	Nominated	
Premios Juventud	2020	Agent of Change Award	Becky G	Won	
Premios Juventud	2021	Artist of the Youth – Female	Becky G	Nominated	
Premios Juventud	2021	Helping Your Fans	Becky G	Won	
Premios Juventud	2021	Girl Power	"Ram Pam Pam" (with Natti Natasha)	Won	
Premios Juventud	2022	Artist of the Youth – Female	Becky G	Nominated	
Premios Juventud	2022	Girl Power	"Pa Mis Muchachas" (with Christina Aguilera and Nicki Nicole featuring Nathy Peluso)	Nominated	
Premios Juventud	2022	Girl Power	"Mamiii" (with Karol G)	Won	
Premios Juventud	2022	Viral Track of the Year	"Mamiii" (with Karol G)	Nominated	
Premios Juventud	2022	Best Social Media Power Couple	Becky G and Sebastian Lletget	Won	
Premios Juventud	2023	Artist of the Youth – Female	Becky G	Nominated	
Premios Juventud	2023	My Favorite Streaming Artist	Becky G	Nominated	
Premios Juventud	2023	My Favorite Trendsetter	Becky G	Nominated	
Premios Juventud	2023	Girl Power	"La Loto" (with Tini and Anitta)	Nominated	
Premios Juventud	2023	The Hottest Choreography	"La Loto" (with Tini and Anitta)	Nominated	
Premios Juventud	2023	Best Urban Album – Female	Esquemas	Nominated	
Premios Juventud	2023	Pop Track Of The Year	"Bailé Con Mi Ex"	Won	
Premios Juventud	2023	Best Regional Mexican Fusion	"Chanel" (with Peso Pluma)	Nominated	
Premios Juventud	2024	Artist of the Youth – Female	Becky G	Nominated	
Premios Juventud	2024	The Perfect Mix	"Por el Contrario" (with Ángela Aguilar and Leonardo Aguilar)	Nominated	
Premios Juventud	2024	Best Regional Mexican Fusion	"Por el Contrario" (with Ángela Aguilar and Leonardo Aguilar)	Nominated	
Premios Juventud	2024	Best Pop/Urban Collaboration	"Arranca" (featuring Omega)	Nominated	
Premios Juventud	2024	Best Regional Mexican Album	Esquinas	Nominated	
Premios Juventud	2025	OMG Collaboration	"Tonight" (Black Eyed Peas and El Alfa featuring Becky G)	Nominated	
Premios Juventud	2025	The Perfect Collab	"Mercedes" (with Óscar Maydon)	Nominated	
Premios Juventud	2025	Tropical Mix	"Que Haces" (with Manuel Turizo)	Nominated	
Premios Juventud	2025	Best Mexican Music Album	Encuentros	Nominated	
Premios Juventud	2026	Best Dance Track	"Sorry Papi" (with Topic)	Nominated	
Premios Nuestra Tierra	2023	Best Urban Song	"Mamiii" (with Karol G)	Nominated	
Premios Odeón	2020	Video of the Year	"Booty" (with C. Tangana)	Nominated	
Premios Quiero	2017	Best Male Artist Video	"Que Nos Animemos" (Axel featuring Becky G)	Won	
Premios Quiero	2018	Best Female Video Artist	"Cuando Te Besé" (with Paulo Londra)	Nominated	
Premios Quiero	2018	Best Extraordinary Encounter	"Cuando Te Besé" (with Paulo Londra)	Nominated	
Premios Quiero	2018	Best Extraordinary Encounter	"Mi Mala" (Remix) (Mau y Ricky and Karol G featuring Becky G, Leslie Grace and Lali)	Nominated	
Premios Quiero	2019	Best Female Video Artist	"La Respuesta" (with Maluma)	Nominated	
Premios Quiero	2020	Best Pop Video	"Perdiendo la Cabeza" (with Carlos Rivera and Pedro Capó)	Nominated	
Premios Tu Música Urbano	2019	International Female Artist	Becky G	Nominated	
Premios Tu Música Urbano	2019	International Artist Song	"Sin Pijama" (with Natti Natasha)	Won	
Premios Tu Música Urbano	2019	International Artist Video	"Sin Pijama" (with Natti Natasha)	Won	
Premios Tu Música Urbano	2019	Remix of the Year	"Dura" (Remix) (Daddy Yankee featuring Natti Natasha, Becky G and Bad Bunny)	Nominated	
Premios Tu Música Urbano	2020	Top Artist – Female	Becky G	Nominated	
Premios Tu Música Urbano	2020	Female Song	"Mala Santa"	Nominated	
Premios Tu Música Urbano	2020	Best Female Album	Mala Santa	Nominated	
Premios Tu Música Urbano	2022	Top Artist – Female	Becky G	Won	
Premios Tu Música Urbano	2022	Collaboration of the Year	"Mamiii" (with Karol G)	Won	
Premios Tu Música Urbano	2022	Collaboration of the Year	"Ram Pam Pam" (with Natti Natasha)	Nominated	
Premios Tu Música Urbano	2022	Video of the Year	"Ram Pam Pam" (with Natti Natasha)	Nominated	
Premios Tu Música Urbano	2022	Top Song – Tropical Urban	"Fulanito" (with El Alfa)	Won	
Premios Tu Música Urbano	2022	Video of the Year – New Artist	"Wow Wow" (María Becerra featuring Becky G)	Nominated	
Premios Tu Música Urbano	2023	Top Artist – Female	Becky G	Won	
Premios Tu Música Urbano	2023	Top Artist – Pop Urban	Becky G	Nominated	
Premios Tu Música Urbano	2023	Top Song – Tropical Urban	"Arranca" (featuring Omega)	Nominated	
Premios Tu Música Urbano	2023	Album of the Year – Female Artist	Esquemas	Nominated	
Premios Tu Música Urbano	2023	Video of the Year	"La Loto" (with Tini and Anitta)	Nominated	
Premios Tu Música Urbano	2025	On the Road Female	Becky G	Nominated	
Premios Tu Música Urbano	2025	Album of the Year – Female Artist	Encuentros	Nominated	
Radio Disney Music Awards	2014	Best New Artist	Becky G	Won	
Radio Disney Music Awards	2014	Artist with the Best Style	Becky G	Nominated	
Radio Disney Music Awards	2015	Catchiest New Song	"Shower"	Won	
Radio Disney Music Awards	2015	Artist with the Best Style	Becky G	Won	
Radio Disney Music Awards	2016	Song to Dance to	"Break a Sweat"	Nominated	
Radio Disney Music Awards	2016	Artist with the Best Style	Becky G	Won	
Ritmo Latino Entertainment Awards	2025	Favorite Music Video	"Por el Contrario" (with Ángela Aguilar and Leonardo Aguilar)	Nominated	
Ritmo Latino Entertainment Awards	2025	Favorite Female Artist	Becky G	Nominated	
Spotify Awards	2020	Most Listened To Urban Pop Artist	Becky G	Nominated	
Spotify Awards	2020	Most-Streamed Female Artist – For Users From 13 to 17 Years Old	Becky G	Nominated	
Spotify Awards	2020	Most-Streamed Female Artist – For Users From 18 to 29 Years Old	Becky G	Nominated	
Spotify Plaques	2024	One Billion Streams Award	"Mamiii" (with Karol G)	Won	
Spotify Plaques	2026	One Billion Streams Award	"Shower"	Won	
Teen Choice Awards	2014	Choice Music – Breakout Artist	Becky G	Nominated	
Teen Choice Awards	2014	Choice Summer Music Star: Female	Becky G	Nominated	
Teen Choice Awards	2016	Choice TV: Scene Stealer	Empire	Nominated	
Teen Choice Awards	2016	Choice Music: Party Song	"Break a Sweat"	Nominated	
Teen Choice Awards	2016	Choice Style: Female	Becky G	Nominated	
Teen Choice Awards	2017	Choice Movie Actress – Sci-Fi/Fantasy	Power Rangers	Nominated	
Teen Choice Awards	2018	Choice Latin Artist	Becky G	Nominated	
Teen Choice Awards	2019	Choice Latin Artist	Becky G	Nominated	
Viña del Mar Awards	2019	Silver Seagull	Becky G	Won	
Viña del Mar Awards	2019	Golden Seagull	Becky G	Won	
WME Awards	2022	Latin American Song	"Bailé Con Mi Ex"	Nominated	
WME Awards	2024	Latin American Song	"Flores Pa Ti" (with Luísa Sonza and Papatinho)	Nominated	
Your World Awards	2015	Fan Club of the Year	Becky G	Nominated	
Your World Awards	2016	Fan Club of the Year	Becky G	Nominated	
Your World Awards	2017	Fan Club of the Year	Becky G	Nominated	

== Other accolades ==
=== Listicles ===
Name of publisher, name of listicle, year(s) listed, and placement result
Publisher	Listicle	Year	Result	Ref.
Billboard	21 Under 21	2014	9th	
Billboard	21 Under 21	2015	12th	
Billboard	21 Under 21	2017	14th	
Billboard	25 Best Latin Albums	2023	Placed (Esquinas)	
Billboard	Best Latin Music Videos	2024	5th ("GomezX4")	
Billboard	Best 50 Female Latin Pop Artists of All Time	2025	46th	
Forbes	30 Under 30	2023	Placed	
The Hollywood Reporter	Latin Power List	2023	Placed	
People en Español	25 Most Powerful Women	2022	6th	
Rolling Stone	18 Teens Shaking Up Pop Culture	2015	Placed	
Telemundo	Queens of Urban Music	2022	Placed	
Time	Time 100 (under "Artists" with tribute written by Selena Gomez)	2025	Placed	
Variety	Youth Impact Report	2016	Placed	
Vogue México	20 Under 30	2026	19th	

=== State honours ===
State honours for Gomez
Country or Organisation	Year	Honor	Ref.
United States	2023	Latino World Order	
United States	2023	Key to City of Coachella	
United States	2023	Key to City of Inglewood	
