= Premio Lo Nuestro 2025 =

37th Lo Nuestro Awards
- Date: February 20, 2025
- Site: Kaseya Center; Miami, Florida, United States
- Hosted by: Alejandra Espinoza; Laura Pausini; Thalía
- Most awards: Shakira (6)
- Most nominations: Becky G Carín León (10)

Television/radio coverage
- Network: Univision

The 37th Lo Nuestro Awards was held at the Kaseya Center in Miami on February 20, 2025. It recognized achievements in Latin music from August 31, 2023 to September 1, 2024. The ceremony was broadcast on Univision and was hosted by Alejandra Espinoza, Laura Pausini and Thalía.

== Performers ==
Below is the list of the live performances of the artists and the songs they performed:

Artist(s)	Performed
Mari	"AKA"
DND (Do Not Disturb)	"Tinder"
Manny Cruz & Aramis Camilo	"El Motor"
Will Smith, India Martinez, DJ Khaled, Thalía & Miami Sound Machine	"First Love" / "Miami" / "Conga"
Kapo	"UWAIE" / "Ohnana"
Ángela Aguilar, Pepe Aguilar & Leonardo Aguilar	"Me saludas a la tuya" / "Tres veces te engañé"
Reik	"Mientes"
Emilia, Silvestre Dangond & Gordo	"Vestido Rojo" / "Olvidarte"
Venesti & Guaynaa	"Mi Debility"
Becky G	"Querido Abuelo"
Piso 21, Marc Anthony & Beéle	"Volver"
Alejandro Sanz & Grupo Frontera	"Hoy no me siento bien"
Alejandro Fernández	"Un Millón de Primaveras" / "La Ley del Monte" / "Estos Celos"
Natti Natasha	"Desde Hoy"
Óscar Maydon	"Tu Boda"
Danny Ocean & Kapo	"Vitamina" / "Imagínate"
Ha*Ash & Thalía	"Amiga Date Cuenta"
Los Ángeles Azules & Thalía	"Yo Me Lo Busqué"
Carín León, Alejandro Sanz, Laura Pausini, Niña Pastori & Édgar Barrera	"Procuro Olvidarte" / "Ese Hombre" / "Dueño de Nada" / "Mi Amante Amigo" / "Como yo te amo"
Yami Safdie & Camilo	"Querida Yo"
El Alfa	"Éste" / "4K" / "La Mamá de la Mamá"
Belinda & Tito Double P	"La Cuadrada"
Prince Royce	"My girl" / "How deep is your love" / "Dancing in the moonlight"
La India	"Nunca Voy A Olvidarte" / "Dicen Que Soy" / "Mi Mayor Venganza"
Xavi & Manuel Turizo	"La Diabla" / "La Víctima" / "En Privado"
Shakira	"Última"
Alejandra Guzmán	"No Se Vale Llorar"
Arthur Hanlon, Ángela Aguilar, Darell & Yotuel Romero	"Bala Perdida" / "Repetimos"

== Winners and nominees ==
The nominations were announced on January 22, 2025. Becky G and Carín León lead with 10 nominations each, followed by Shakira and Myke Towers with 9, while Emilia, Ángela Aguilar, Grupo Frontera, and Leonardo Aguilar received 8 nods each. Shakira received the most awards with 6, followed by León with 5, while Camilo and Karol G received 4 awards each.

Winners appear first and highlighted in bold.

=== General ===
**Artist of the Year**: **Karol G**; Carín León; Feid; Fuerza Regida; Grupo Frontera; Maluma; Myke Towers; Peso Pluma; Shakira; Xavi	**Song of the Year**: **"Si Antes Te Hubiera Conocido" – Karol G**; "Bubalu" – Feid and Rema; "Cosas de la Peda" – Prince Royce featuring Gabito Ballesteros; "Tu Boda" – Óscar Maydon and Fuerza Regida; "La Diabla" – Xavi; "La Falda" – Myke Towers; "Perdonarte, ¿Para Qué?" – Los Ángeles Azules and Emilia; "Por el Contrario" – Becky G, Ángela Aguilar and Leonardo Aguilar; "Primera Cita" – Carín León; "Puntería" – Shakira and Cardi B
**Album of the Year**: **Las Mujeres Ya No Lloran – Shakira**; Boca Chueca, Vol. 1 – Carín León; Bolero – Ángela Aguilar; Esquinas – Becky G; Jugando a Que No Pasa Nada – Grupo Frontera; Llamada Perdida – Prince Royce; LVEU: Vive la Tuya... No la Mía – Myke Towers; Muevense – Marc Anthony; Nadie Sabe Lo Que Va a Pasar Mañana – Bad Bunny; Pa Las Baby's y Belikeada – Fuerza Regida	**Best Female Combination**: **"Jackpot" – Belinda and Kenia Os**; "5 Babys" – Kim Loaiza, Fariana, Ptazeta, Bellakath and Yami Safdie; "A Las 12 Te Olvidé" – Ha*Ash and Elena Rose; "Chulo Pt. 2" – Bad Gyal, Tokischa and Young Miko; "Cuidadito" – Becky G and Chiquis; "La Original" – Emilia and Tini; "Labios Mordidos" – Kali Uchis and Karol G; "Mi Rey, Mi Santo" – María José and Ana Bárbara; "Que Vuelva" – Kany García and Carla Morrison; "Troca" – Thalía and Ángela Aguilar
**Crossover Collaboration of the Year**: **"Puntería" – Shakira and Cardi B**; "2 the Moon" – Pitbull, Ne-Yo, Afrojack featuring DJ Buddha; "Chula" – Grupo Firme and Demi Lovato; "Degenere" – Myke Towers featuring Benny Blanco; "It Was Always You (Siempre Fuiste Tú)" – Carín León and Leon Bridges; "To the Beat" – Dimitri Vegas & Like Mike, Regard, Natti Natasha, Sash!; "Tonight (Bad Boys: Ride or Die)" – Black Eyed Peas and El Alfa featuring Becky G; "Vocation" – Ozuna and David Guetta	**The Perfect Mix of the Year**: **"Una Vida Pasada" – Camilo and Carín León**; "(Entre Paréntesis)" – Shakira and Grupo Frontera; "Bling Bling" – Maluma, Octavio Cuadras and Grupo Marca Registrada; "Cosas de la Peda" – Prince Royce featuring Gabito Ballesteros; "El Caballito" – Fariana and Oro Solido; "Fuego de Noche, Nieve de Día" – Ricky Martin and Christian Nodal; "La Tóxica" – Alejandro Fernández and Anitta; "La Vida Es Una Fiesta" – Sergio George and Wisin; "Perdonarte, ¿Para Qué?" – Los Ángeles Azules and Emilia; "Por el Contrario" – Becky G, Ángela Aguilar and Leonardo Aguilar
**Tour of the Year**: **Cerrando Ciclos – Aventura**; Ferxxxocalipsis Tour 2024 – Feid; Luis Miguel Tour 2023–24 – Luis Miguel; Mañana Será Bonito Tour – Karol G; Most Wanted Tour – Bad Bunny

=== Urban ===
**Male Urban Artist of the Year**: **Feid**; Bad Bunny; Chencho Corleone; Don Omar; Eladio Carrión; Myke Towers; Ozuna; Rauw Alejandro; Wisin; Yandel	**Female Urban Artist of the Year**: **Karol G**; Anitta; Bad Gyal; Bellakath; Fariana; Greeicy; María Becerra; Natti Natasha; Nicki Nicole; Young Miko
**Urban Song of the Year**: **"Bellakeo" – Peso Pluma and Anitta**; "Baccarat" – Ozuna; "Carbon Vrmor" – Farruko & Sharo Towers; "Chulo PT. 2" – Bad Gyal, Tokischa & Young Miko; "Gata Only" – FloyyMenor & Cris MJ; "La Falda" – Myke Towers; "La Nena" – Lyanno and Rauw Alejandro; "Ohnana" – Kapo; "Sandunga" – Don Omar, Wisin and Yandel; "Un Preview" – Bad Bunny	**Best Urban Trap/Hip Hop Song**: **"Mónaco" – Bad Bunny**; "Gata G" – Ryan Castro; "Si, si, si, si" – The Academy: Segunda Misión, Justin Quiles, Sech, Lenny Tavárez, Dalex, Dímelo Flow featuring Eladio Carrión, Bryant Myers & Dei V; "Tacos Gucci" – Anuel AA; "Tranky Funky" – Trueno; "Wiggy" – Young Miko
**Urban Collaboration of the Year**: **"Perro Negro" – Bad Bunny and Feid**; "5 Babys" – Kim Loaiza, Fariana, Ptazeta, Bellakath and Yami Safdie; "Alegría" – Tiago PZK, Anitta and Emilia; "Bien Loco" – Wisin and Mora; "Borracho y Loco" – Yandel and Myke Towers; "Mírame" – Blessd & Ovy on the Drums; "Otra Vibra" – Luar La L and Ozuna; "Para Siempre" – Zion & Lennox and Anuel AA; "Polvo de Tu Vida" – J Balvin & Chencho Corleone; "Sandunga" – Don Omar, Wisin and Yandel	**Best Dembow Song**: **"Hay Lupita" – Lomiiel**; "Che Che" – Chimbala; "Déjenme Rulay" – Rochy RD & Donaty; "Dora" – Fariana and El Alfa; "Este" – El Alfa & Nfasis
**Urban Album of the Year**: **Mañana Será Bonito (Bichota Season) – Karol G**; ATT. – Young Miko; Cvrbon Vrmor [C_DE:G_D.O.N] – Farruko; Ferxxocalipsis – Feid; La joia – Bad Gyal; LVEU: Vive La Tuya… No La Mía – Myke Towers; Mr. W (Deluxe) – Wisin; Nadie Sabe Lo Que Va a Pasar Mañana – Bad Bunny; Porque Puedo – Eladio Carrión; Rayo – J Balvin

=== Pop ===
**Male Pop Artist of the Year**: **Carlos Rivera**; Danny Ocean; Luis Fonsi; Maluma; Manuel Medrano; Pedro Capó	**Female Pop Artist of the Year**: **Shakira**; Belinda; Elena Rose; Emilia; Kali Uchis; Kany García; Laura Pausini; Thalía
**Pop/Rock Group or Duo of the Year**: **Ha*Ash**; Camila; Darumas; Rawayana; Reik; The Warning	**Male Pop-Rock/Urban New Artist of the Year**: **Kapo**; Ca7riel & Paco Amoroso; Clarent; DND (Do Not Disturb); FloyyMenor; Izaak; Luar La L; Maisak; Timo; Venesti
**Female Pop-Rock/Urban New Artist of the Year**: **Ela Taubert**; Bellakath; Darumas; Daymé Arocena; Irepelusa; Judeline; Letón Pé; Mari; Paola Guanche; Yami Safdie	**Pop Song Of The Year**: **"¿Cómo Pasó?" – Ela Taubert**; "Abril" – Reik; "Fría" – Enrique Iglesias & Yotuel; "La Original" – Emilia and Tini; "Los Domingos" – Sebastián Yatra; "Mejor Que Ayer" – Diego Torres; "Santa Marta" – Luis Fonsi and Carlos Vives; "Verano en NY" – Manuel Medrano
**Pop/Ballad Song Of The Year**: **"Lo Que Nos Faltó Decir" – Jesse & Joy**; "Corazón en Coma" – Camila & Edén Muñoz; "Fuego de Noche, Nieve de Día" – Ricky Martin and Christian Nodal; "No Sé Quien Soy" – Olga Tañón and Lenier; "Para Ti" – Carlos Rivera; "Que Vuelva" – Kany García and Carla Morrison; "Roma" – Luis Fonsi and Laura Pausini; "Somos Novios" – Ángela Aguilar featuring Los Panchos	**Best Pop Latin Fusion Song**: **"Siento Que Merezco Más" – Latin Mafia**; "Brujería!" – Judeline; "La Que Puede, Puede" – Ca7riel & Paco Amoroso; "Lejos De Ti" – The Marías; "Veneka" – Rawayana & Akapellah
**Christian Music Song Of The Year**: **"Bonita" – Daddy Yankee**; "Conéctate Conmigo" – Gocho, Redimi2 and Wisin; "Hermoso Momento- Remix" – Farruko & Kairo Worship; "Libre" – Alex Campos & Tauren Wells; "Mambo 23" – Juan Luis Guerra 4.40; "Primero Nos Amó" – Matthew Hotton & Marcos Witt	**Pop-Urban Album Of The Year**: **Las Mujeres Ya No Lloran – Shakira**; .MP3 – Emilia; El Viaje – Luis Fonsi; Funk Generation – Anitta; García – Kany García; Hotel Caracas – Mau y Ricky; Nasty Singles – Natti Natasha; Panorama – Reik; Reflexa – Danny Ocean; Trackhouse – Pitbull
**Pop-Urban Collaboration Of The Year**: **"Puntería" – Shakira and Cardi B**; "Bubalu" – Feid and Rema; "Calor" – Nicky Jam & Beéle; "Extrañándote" – Zhamira Zambrano & Jay Wheeler; "La Misión" – Piso 21 and Wisin; "OA" – Anuel AA, Quevedo, Maluma featuring Mambo Kingz & DJ Luian	**Pop-Urban Song Of The Year**: **"Tommy & Pamela" – Peso Pluma and Kenia Os**; "Amor" – Danny Ocean; "El Yate" – Lenny Tavárez; "Fanática Del Reggaetón" – Venesti; "Funk Rave" – Anitta; "Loveo" – Daddy Yankee; "Ojos. Labios. Cara" – Manuel Turizo; "Pasado Mañana" – Mau y Ricky; "Touching the Sky" – Rauw Alejandro; "Ya No Te Extraño" – Natti Natasha
**Pop-Urban/Dance Song Of The Year**: **"Touching the Sky" – Rauw Alejandro**; "Como la Flor" – Play-N-Skillz, Natti Natasha and Deorro; "Freak 54 (Freak Out)" – Pitbull & Nile Rodgers; "Te Va a Doler (Remix)" – Thalía & Deorro; "Vocation" – Ozuna and David Guetta	**Pop-Urban Best "EuroSong"**: **"Chulo Pt. 2" – Bad Gyal, Tokischa & Young Miko**; "4to 23" – Aitana; "Columbia" – Quevedo; "La Reina" – Lola Indigo; "Madrid City" – Ana Mena

=== Tropical ===
**Tropical Artist Of The Year**: **Carlos Vives**; Gente de Zona; Jerry Rivera; Juan Luis Guerra 4.40; La India; Luis Figueroa; Marc Anthony; Olga Tañón; Prince Royce; Silvestre Dangond	**Tropical Song Of The Year**: **"Una Vida Pasada" – Camilo and Carín León**; "Ale Ale" – Marc Anthony; "Bandido" – Luis Figueroa; "La Capi" – Myke Towers; "Mambo 23" – Juan Luis Guerra 4.40; "No Le Cuentes" – Jerry Rivera; "Otra Noche Más" – Víctor Manuelle featuring Frankie Ruiz; "Quiéreme Menos" – Natti Natasha; "Si Antes Te Hubiera Conocido" – Karol G; "Una Vida Buena" – Kany García
**Tropical Collaboration Of The Year**: **"Plis" – Camilo and Evaluna Montaner**; "Celia" – Gente de Zona & Celia Cruz; "Cosas de la Peda" – Prince Royce featuring Gabito Ballesteros; "El Caballito" – Fariana and Oro Solido; "Fuera Fuera" – La India & Jacob Forever; "La Vida Es Una Fiesta" – Sergio George and Wisin; "No Es Normal" – Venesti, Nacho & Maffio; "Salsa de Ahora" – Motiff, Jonathan Moly, Luis Figueroa featuring Jimmy Rodriguez, Ronald Borjas & Nesty; "Tú o Yo" – Silvestre Dangond & Carlos Vives; "Vamos a Ser Feliz" – Olga Tañón and Christian Alicea	**Tropical Album Of The Year**: **Cuatro – Camilo**; Así Yo Soy – Olga Tañón; Coexistencia – Luis Figueroa; Demasiado – Gente de Zona; Llamada Perdida – Prince Royce; Muevense – Marc Anthony; Radio Güira – Juan Luis Guerra 4.40; Retromántico – Víctor Manuelle; Ta Malo – Silvestre Dangond; Yo Deluxe – Christian Alicea

=== Mexican ===
**Mexican Music - Male Artist Of The Year**: **Carín León**; Alejandro Fernández; Christian Nodal; Gabito Ballesteros; Junior H; Leonardo Aguilar; Pepe Aguilar; Peso Pluma; Xavi; Óscar Maydon	**Mexican Music - Female Artist Of The Year**: **Majo Aguilar**; Aida Cuevas; Ana Bárbara; Ángela Aguilar; Camila Fernández; Chiquis; Karna Sofía; Lila Downs; Lupita Infante; Yuridia
**Mexican Music - Group or Duo Of The Year**: **Grupo Frontera**; Banda Los Recoditos; Fuerza Regida; Grupo Firme; Intocable; Los Ángeles Azules	**Mexican Music - New Artist**: **Xavi**; Calle 24; Chino Pacas; Codiciado; El Padrinito Toys; Gabito Ballesteros; Netón Vega; Óscar Maydon; Tito Double P; Victor Mendivil
**Mexican Music - Song Of The Year**: **"Primera Cita" – Carín León**; "Buscándole a La Suerte" – Julión Álvarez y su Norteño Banda; "De Lunes a Lunes" – Grupo Frontera and Manuel Turizo; "La Boda" – Óscar Maydon and Fuerza Regida; "La Diabla" – Xavi; "La Intención" – Christian Nodal and Peso Pluma; "Obsesión" – Intocable; "Perdonarte, ¿Para Qué?" – Los Ángeles Azules and Emilia; "Por el Contrario" – Becky G, Ángela Aguilar and Leonardo Aguilar; "Vas a Querer Volver" – Banda Los Recoditos	**Mexican Music - Collaboration Of The Year**: **"(Entre Paréntesis)" – Shakira and Grupo Frontera**; "Alucin" – Eugenio Esquivel, Grupo Marca Registrada and Sebastian Esquivel; "Bandido de Amores" – Leonardo Aguilar and Pepe Aguilar; "Bling Bling" – Maluma, Octavio Cuadras and Grupo Marca Registrada; "Dos Días" – Tito Double P and Peso Pluma; "El Humo de Mi Gallo" – Banda Los Sebastianes de Saúl Plata & Edgardo Nuñéz; "La Cumbia Triste" – Los Ángeles Azules and Alejandro Fernández; "Mercedes" – Becky G featuring Óscar Maydon; "Natanael Cano: Bzrp Music Sessions, Vol. 59" – Bizarrap & Natanael Cano; "Si No Quieres No" – Luis R. Conriquez & Netón Vega
**Banda Song Of The Year**: **"Vas a Querer Volver" – Banda Los Recoditos**; "Bandida" – La Adictiva, Grupo Marca Registrada and Montana; "Bandido de Amores" – Leonardo Aguilar and Pepe Aguilar; "El Humo de Mi Gallo" – Banda Los Sebastianes de Saúl Plata & Edgardo Nuñéz; "Tu Perfume" – Banda MS de Sergio Lizárraga	**Mariachi/Ranchera Song Of The Year**: **"Por el Contrario" – Becky G, Ángela Aguilar and Leonardo Aguilar**; "Cuéntame" – Majo Aguilar & Alex Fernández; "La Tóxica" – Alejandro Fernández and Anitta; "Lamentablemente" – Pepe Aguilar and Carín León; "Mi Eterno Amor Secreto" – Yuridia & Edén Muñoz; "Necesito Un Segundo" – Chayanne
**Norteño Song Of The Year**: **"Buscándole a La Suerte" – Julión Álvarez y Su Norteño Banda**; "¿Quién Te Crees Para Olvidarme?' – Adriel Favela & Duelo; "Mi Castigo" – Intocable; "Neta Que No" – La Fiera de Oijnaga; "Perro Amor" – La Maquinaria Norteña	**Mexican Music - Fusion of The Year**: **"La Diabla" – Xavi**; "First Love" – Oscar Ortiz & Edgardo Nuñéz; "Mejores Jordans" – Víctor Mendivil and Óscar Maydon; "Mercedes" – Becky G featuring Óscar Maydon; "Ya Pedo Quién Sabe" – Grupo Frontera and Christian Nodal
**Mexican Music - Best Electro Corrido**: **"Harley Quinn" – Fuerza Regida and Marshmello**; "Exceso" – Sebastian Esquivel, Blessd & Eugenio Esquivel; "Fresa Con Crema" – Lalo Cruz; "Gabachas" – Codiciado, Joaquín Medina & Sheeno; "Teka" – Peso Pluma and DJ Snake	**Mexican Music - Album Of The Year**: **Boca Chueca, Vol. 1 – Carín León**; Aquí Hay Para Llevar – La Arrolladora Banda el Limon de Rene Camacho; Esquinas – Becky G; Jugando a Que No Pasa Nada – Grupo Frontera; Modus Operandi – Intocable; Pa Las Baby's y Belikeada – Fuerza Regida; Presente – Julión Álvarez y Su Norteño Banda; Raíz Nunca Me Fui – Lila Downs, Niña Pastori & Soledad; Soy Como Quiero Ser – Leonardo Aguilar; Te Llevo En La Sangre – Alejandro Fernández

== Special Merit Awards ==
On January 30, 2025, the recipients for the special awards were announced.

- Lifetime Achievement Award: La India
- Legacy Award: Manuel Alejandro
- Excellence Award: Alejandro Fernández
