= Madonna (Natanael Cano and Óscar Maydon song) =

Single by Natanael Cano and Óscar Maydon
- Language: Spanish
- Released: 8 March 2024
- Genre: Regional Mexican
- Length: 3:07
- Label: Rancho Humilde; Los CT
- Songwriters: Alexis Fierro; Natanael Cano; Óscar Maydon
- Producers: Marcelo Rivera Levy; Natanael Cano

Natanael Cano singles chronology
"Proyecto X" (2024)	"Madonna" (2024)	"El Boss" (2024)

Óscar Maydon singles chronology
"Fresas de la Capital" (2024)	"Madonna" (2024)	"Don Dimadon" (2024)

Music video
- "Madonna" on YouTube

"Madonna" is a song by Mexican singers Natanael Cano and Óscar Maydon, released on 8 March 2024 through Rancho Humilde and Los CT. The release of the single led to Cano returning as the most listened artist in Mexico.

Its music video was released on the same day of single release.

== Music and lyrics ==
"Madonna" is a corrido tumbado with romantic lyrics. Titled after American singer Madonna, the song's lyrics revolve around love, with the artists expressing their feelings with verses such as "Le mando dinero a tus papás / Muevo el mundo si es por ti, nomás / Tú eres Madonna en la actualidad / Mi güerita flow rock star".

== Reception ==
Critical response toward the song was predominantly positive, complimented by Natanael Cano's corrido tumbado style which he largely popularized. El Mexicano described "Madonna" as a "emotional corrido" with a mix full of "deep emotions", and called the song as one of Cano's most intimate works to date. Upon release, the song topped Mexican's streaming music platforms.

== Music video ==
An official video clip was posted on 7 March 2024 on Natanael Cano's YouTube channel. The video was produced by Luxon Films. Upon premiere, it was placed among first ranks of music trends on YouTube.

== Charts ==
=== Weekly charts ===
Weekly chart performance for "Madonna"
Chart (2024)	Peak position
Global 200 (Billboard)	26
Mexico (Billboard)	1
US Bubbling Under Hot 100 (Billboard)	9
US Hot Latin Songs (Billboard)	9

=== Year-end charts ===
2024 year-end chart performance for "Madonna"
Chart (2024)	Position
Global 200 (Billboard)	157
