= La Tóxica =

Single by Alejandro Fernández and Anitta

from the album Te Llevo En La Sangre
- Language: Spanish
- Released: May 23, 2024
- Genre: Regional Mexican
- Length: 2:57
- Label: Universal Music Latin Entertainment
- Songwriters: Adrian Navarro; Amerika Jimenez; Arturo Munguía; Mango; Nabález
- Producer: Aureo Baqueiro

Alejandro Fernández singles chronology
"Cobijas Ajenas" (2024)	"La Tóxica" (2024)

Anitta singles chronology
"Posso Beijar Sua Boca?" (2024)	"La Tóxica" (2024)	"Gata Only (Remix)" (2024)

Music video
- "La Tóxica" on YouTube

"La Tóxica" (The Toxic) is the fourth single by Mexican singer Alejandro Fernández, released on May 23, 2024, as part of the album Te Llevo En La Sangre. The song features Brazilian singer Anitta and blends regional Mexican.

== Background and release ==
Alejandro Fernández and Anitta surprised the music world by collaborating on the song "La Tóxica," released on May 23, 2024, as the fourth single from the album Te Llevo En La Sangre. The blend of both artists' styles brought a fresh take to regional Mexican music, highlighting their chemistry. The music video was released simultaneously on the YouTube platform.

== Music and lyrics ==
The main theme of the song is the exhaustion caused by toxic romantic relationships and the celebration of the happiness of being single. The music blends regional Mexican pop with elements of Brazilian pop, creating an innovative fusion between the two styles. While the song leans toward the corrido tumbado style, Anitta's contribution, known for her hits in pop and reggaeton, brings a fresh perspective to regional Mexican music. Her versatility and talent shine through, while Alejandro Fernández adds his unmistakable experience and style, making this collaboration a milestone in both artists' careers.

== Music video ==
The music video for "La Tóxica" was released alongside the single on May 23, 2024. In the video, Alejandro Fernández and Anitta ride horseback through the natural landscapes of a farm, reflecting the rural essence of regional Mexico. The rural atmosphere contrasts with the emotional theme of the song, highlighting the bucolic scenery as the artists discuss their romantic disappointments. The video's aesthetics reinforce the connection to the roots of regional Mexican genre and the symbolism of freedom present in the lyrics. In the music video, the singer and the female artist portray characters reflecting on their romantic experiences. Alejandro expresses his frustration dealing with a "toxic" woman but admits to still having feelings for her.

== Commercial performance ==
Since its debut on the Regional Mexican Airplay in July 2024, "La Tóxica" has been steadily rising in radio plays. During the tracking week of September 6 to 12, 2024, the norteño corrido accumulated 6.3 million audience impressions in the U.S., a 37% increase from the previous week, according to Luminate. The song was also recognized as the "Top Gainer" of the week, a title awarded to the song with the highest audience gain.

The song is the fourth single from the album Te Llevo En La Sangre to reach the top of the Billboard Regional Mexican Airplay. It follows previous hits "No Es Que Me Quiera Ir", "Difícil Tu Caso" and "Cobijas Ajenas" (with Olivas), all of which topped the chart for one week between 2023 and 2024.

With "La Tóxica" reaching the top, Alejandro Fernández raises his total of number 1 hits to 10, establishing himself as the third solo artist with the most chart-toppers since the chart's inception in 1994. Christian Nodal remains in the lead with 17 songs at number 1, followed by Gerardo Ortiz, who has 13.

Anitta made history by becoming the first Brazilian to reach the top of the Regional Mexican Airplay. The singer became the 10th female solo artist to top the chart and the fifth solo artist outside the regional Mexican genre to secure a number 1.

== Charts ==
Chart (2024)	Peak position
Chile (Monitor Latino)	3
Ecuador (Monitor Latino)	13
Internacional (Monitor Latino)	13
Mexico (Monitor Latino)	1
Paraguay (Monitor Latino)	8
US Latin Airplay (Billboard)	2
US Regional Mexican Airplay (Billboard)	1
