= Te Quiero Besar =

Single by Fuerza Regida and Becky G
- Language: Spanish
- Released: February 14, 2023
- Length: 3:10
- Label: Rancho Humilde; Sony Latin
- Songwriters: Jesús Ortiz Paz; Alexis Fierro; Édgar Barrera; Rebbeca Marie Gomez
- Producers: Jesús Ortiz Paz; Jimmy Humilde; Édgar Barrera

Fuerza Regida singles chronology
"Vete Ya" (2023)	"Te Quiero Besar" (2023)	"Desvelado" (2023)

Becky G singles chronology
"Amantes" (2022)	"Te Quiero Besar" (2023)	"Arranca" (2023)

Music video
- "Te Quiero Besar" on YouTube

"Te Quiero Besar" is a song recorded by regional Mexican band Fuerza Regida and American singer Becky G. It was released by Sony Music Latin on February 14, 2023.

== Live performances ==
Fuerza Regida and Gomez performed the song together live for the first time at the Coachella 2023 on April 14, 2023.

== Charts ==
Chart performance for "Te Quiero Besar"
Chart (2023)	Peak position
US Hot Latin Songs (Billboard)	27

== Release history ==
Release dates and formats for "Te Quiero Besar"
Region	Date	Format	Label	Ref.
Various	February 14, 2023	Digital download; streaming	Kemosabe; RCA; Sony Latin	
