= Mal de Amores =

2021 single by Sofía Reyes and Becky G

Single by Sofía Reyes and Becky G

from the album Mal de Amores
- Language: Spanish
- English title: "Lovesickness"
- Released: September 10, 2021
- Genre: Cumbia
- Length: 3:08
- Label: Warner Latina
- Songwriters: Elena Rose; Andrés Torres; Mauricio Rengifo; Rebbeca Gomez; Sofía Reyes
- Producers: Andres Torres; Mauricio Rengifo

Sofía Reyes singles chronology
| "Seaside" (2021) | "Mal de Amores" (2021) | "Family" (2021) |

Becky G singles chronology
| "Wow Wow" (2021) | "Mal de Amores" (2021) | "Baila Así" (2021) |

Music video
- "Mal de Amores" on YouTube

"Mal de Amores" is a song by Mexican singer Sofía Reyes and American singer Becky G. The song was released on September 10, 2021, by Warner Music Latina as the eighth single of Reyes's second studio album of the same name.

== Music video ==
The music video was released alongside the song on September 10, directed by Mike Ho. As of January 2024, it has over 140 million views on YouTube.

== Charts ==
=== Weekly charts ===
| Chart (2021) | Peak position |
|---|---|
| Argentina Hot 100 (Billboard) | 65 |
| Ecuador (National-Report) | 8 |
| Mexico Airplay (Billboard) | 22 |
| Mexico Espanol Airplay (Billboard) | 7 |
| US Latin Airplay (Billboard) | 35 |
| US Latin Pop Airplay (Billboard) | 15 |
| US Latin Rhythm Airplay (Billboard) | 17 |

=== Year-end charts ===
| Chart (2022) | Position |
|---|---|
| Dominican Republic Pop (Monitor Latino) | 90 |
| Puerto Rico Pop (Monitor Latino) | 24 |
| US Latin Pop Airplay Songs (Billboard) | 41 |

== Certifications ==
| Region | Certification | Certified units/sales |
|---|---|---|
| Peru (UNIMPRO) | Gold | 3,000 |
| United States (RIAA) | Platinum (Latin) | 60,000^{‡} |
^{‡} Sales+streaming figures based on certification alone.
