= Crisis (Becky G and Tito Double P song) =

Song by Becky G and Tito Double P

from the album Encuentros
- Released: October 10, 2024
- Studio: Just for the Record (Sun Valley, CA)
- Length: 3:12
- Label: Kemosabe; RCA; Sony Latin
- Songwriters: Rebbeca Marie Gomez; Sara Schell; Jesús Roberto Laija García
- Producer: Ernesto Fernández

Music video
- "Crisis" (Visualizer) on YouTube

"Crisis" is a song by American singer Becky G and Mexican rapper Tito Double P, from Gomez's fourth studio album, Encuentros.

== Charts ==
Chart performance for "Crisis"
Chart (2024–2025)	Peak position
US Latin Airplay (Billboard)	20
US Regional Mexican Airplay (Billboard)	8
