= Como Diablos =

Single by Becky G

from the album Encuentros
- Language: Spanish
- Released: August 30, 2024
- Studio: Just for the Record (Sun Valley, CA)
- Genre: Regional Mexican
- Length: 3:14
- Label: Kemosabe; RCA
- Songwriters: Rebbeca Marie Gomez; Adrián Pieragostino; Hector Guerrero; Sara Schell
- Producers: Hector Guerrero; Adrián Pieragostino

Becky G singles chronology
"Tonight" (2024)	"Como Diablos" (2024)	"Bluetooth" (2024)

Music video
- "Como Diablos" on YouTube

"Como Diablos" (stylized in all caps) is a song recorded by American singer Becky G. It was released by Kemosabe Records and RCA Records on August 30, 2024, as the second single from Gomez's fourth studio album, Encuentros.

== Music video ==
The music video was released on August 29. It was directed by Leo Aguirre, and shot in Monterrey, Mexico.

== Release history ==
Release dates and formats for "Como Diablos"
Region	Date	Format	Label	Ref.
Various	August 30, 2024	Digital download; streaming	Kemosabe; RCA	
