= Amantes (song) =

2022 single by Becky G and Daviles de Novelda

Single by Becky G and Daviles de Novelda
- Language: Spanish
- English title: "Lovers"
- Released: September 16, 2022
- Genre: Bachata; Flamenco; Urban
- Length: 3:00
- Label: Kemosabe; RCA
- Songwriters: Rebbeca Marie Gomez; Manuel David Fernandez Molina; Juan Nicolas Mayorca Escobar; Manuel Lorente Freire; Alberto Mora Amigo; Edgardo Noé Chavez Paz; David Muñumel Garoña; Jorge Ángel Calvet Díaz; Francisco José Vargas Gabarri
- Producers: Echo; Nerso; Scorpion; 22Shots

Becky G singles chronology
"La Loto" (2022)	"Amantes" (2022)	"Te Quiero Besar" (2023)

Daviles de Novelda singles chronology
"Pena" (2022)	"Amantes" (2022)	"La Despedida" (2022)

Music video
- "Amantes" on YouTube

"Amantes" is a song recorded by American singer Becky G and Spanish singer Daviles de Novelda, which features bachata music, her first song in the genre. It was released by Kemosabe Records and RCA Records on September 16, 2022.

== Background and release ==
Gomez first teased the song by posting a snippet of the track on the social media app TikTok, where she and a male singer can be heard. She later announced the single's release along with its cover art, revealing that the featured artist was Spanish singer Daviles de Novelda.

== Composition ==
"Amantes" is a bachata and flamenco song with influences of rap and urban music. The song's lyrics find the artists asking their exes for a second chance, proposing for them to be "lovers" again.

== Music video ==
The music video was released on October 7, 2022. It was directed by A Zazo Canvas. The video consists of homemade footage of Gomez around Spain where she had several shows. It has 4.5 million views as of March 2023.

== Charts ==
Chart performance for "Amantes"
Chart (2022)	Peak position
Spain (PROMUSICAE)	74

== Certifications ==
Certifications and sales for "Amantes"
Region	Certification	Certified units/sales
Spain (Promusicae)	Platinum	60,000^{‡}
^{‡} Sales+streaming figures based on certification alone.

== Release history ==
Release dates and formats for "Amantes"
Region	Date	Format	Label	Ref.
Various	September 16, 2022	Digital download; streaming	Kemosabe; RCA	
