= Bella Ciao (Becky G song) =

Single by Becky G
- Language: Spanish; English; Italian
- Released: December 1, 2021
- Length: 2:40
- Label: Kemosabe; RCA
- Songwriter: Traditional
- Producer: Di Genius

Becky G singles chronology
"Pa Mis Muchachas" (2021)	"Bella Ciao" (2021)	"Mamiii" (2022)

Music video
- "Bella Ciao" on YouTube

"Bella Ciao" is a song recorded by American singer Becky G for inclusion on the soundtrack of the Netflix show Money Heist (2021).

== Background and release ==
"Bella ciao" is an Italian protest folk song from the late 19th century, and the song’s connection to the Spanish series is because "the Professor’s whole life revolved around one idea… resistance", according to an official statement. Gomez sings in Italian for the first time.

== Music video ==
The music video for "Bella Ciao" was directed by Megan Gámez.

== Charts ==
Chart (2021–2022)	Peak position
Hungary (Dance Top 40)	10
