= Encuentros =

2024 studio album by Becky G

Studio album by Becky G
- Released: October 10, 2024
- Studios: Just for the Record (Sun Valley, CA)
- Length: 49:30
- Language: Spanish
- Labels: Kemosabe; RCA
- Producers: Édgar Barrera; Casta; Ernesto Fernández; Becky G; Hector Guerrero; Adrián Pieragostino; Sara Schell; Justus West

Becky G chronology
Esquinas (2023)	Encuentros (2024)	Baraja Bendita (2026)

Singles from Encuentros
- 1. "Mercedes" Released: April 11, 2024; 2. "Como Diablos" Released: August 30, 2024; 3. "Otro Capítulo" Released: October 9, 2024

Encuentros (English: Encounters) is the fourth Spanish-language studio album by American singer Becky G. It was released on October 10, 2024, by Kemosabe and RCA Records.

It was announced alongside the release of the second single "Como Diablos" on August 30, 2024, and was supported by a tour that began shortly after the album's release, and ended in November 2024.

== Singles ==
On April 11, 2024, Gomez released her collaboration with Óscar Maydon, the song "Mercedes", as the lead single from album.

On August 29, she released "Como Diablos", as the album's second single.

On October 9, "Otro Capítulo" was released as the album's third single.

On November 15, Gomez released "GomezX4" as the first promotional single.

With this album, Becky made her record producer debut, solely producing and writing the track, "Mucho Mucho Muchooo"

== Track listing ==
Encuentros track listing
No.	Title	Writer(s)	Producer(s)	Length
1.	"XLas Nubes"	Rebbeca Marie Gomez; Adrián Pieragostino; Hector Guerrero	Pieragostino; Jose Leyva^{[m]}	3:07
2.	"Visto Caro"	Gomez; Guerrero; Sara Schell	Guerrero; Pieragostino; Cezar Alberto Chavez^{[m]}	2:44
3.	"Desierto"	Gomez; Guerrero; Schell	Pieragostino; Leyva^{[m]}	3:16
4.	"Como Diablos"	Gomez; Pieragostino; Guerrero; Schell	Guerrero; Pieragostino	3:14
5.	"Crisis" (with Tito Double P)	Gomez; Schell; Jesús Roberto Laija García	Ernesto Fernández	3:12
6.	"Bandido"	Gomez; Guerrero; Justus West; Schell	Justus West	3:22
7.	"Mercedes" (with Óscar Maydon)	Gomez; Schell; Guerrero	Schell; Guerrero	2:48
8.	"Besándote" (with Oscar Ortiz)	Gomez; Guerrero; Schell	Pieragostino; Leyva^{[m]}	3:08
9.	"Muchas Gracias"	Gomez; Guerrero; Schell	Pieragostino; Guerrero; Leyva^{[m]}	3:14
10.	"Ojalá"	Gomez; Guerrero; Wendy Besada Rodríguez	Pieragostino; Guerrero; Leyva^{[m]}	3:10
11.	"Todo" (with Delilah)	Gomez; Verónica Minguez; Schell; Nathan Galante; Horacio Palencia; Diego Bolela; Delilah Cabrera	West	4:02
12.	"Ultima Vez"	Gomez; West; Manuel Lorente Freire; Schell; Nathaniel Campany	West; Leyva^{[m]}	3:14
13.	"GomezX4"	Gomez; Guerrero; Schell	Guerrero; Leyva^{[m]}	2:57
14.	"Otro Capítulo"	Gomez; Édgar Barrera; Elena Rose; Aldo Vargas; Eduardo Mosquera; Luis Miguel Gómez Castaño	Casta; Barrera	3:00
15.	"Mucho Mucho Muchooo"	Gomez	Becky G	1:45
16.	"Por el Contrario (Demo)"	Barrera; Kevyn Mauricio Cruz Moreno; Rose; Gomez	Édgar Barrera	3:17
Total length:				49:30

Note

- ^{^[m]} signifies a miscellaneous producer

== Personnel ==
=== Musicians ===
- Becky G – vocals
- Adrián Pieragostino – programming (1–4, 7–10, 13), keyboards (10)
- Jose "Meño" De Luna – acoustic guitar, bass, guitar (2)
- Jose A. Ruiz – trombone (2)
- Guerrero – vocals (2)
- Sergio Cardenas – accordion (3)
- Tito Double P – vocals (5)
- Ernesto Fernández – programming (5)
- Justus West – all instruments, programming (6, 11, 12)
- Juan-Carlos Chaurand – percussion (6)
- Óscar Maydon – vocals (7)
- Oscar Ortiz – vocals (8)
- Juan Carlos Portillo – bass, electric guitar (10)
- Delilah – vocals (11)
- Casta – programming (14)

=== Technical ===
- Kevin Peterson – mastering (1–4, 6–10, 12, 13)
- Ernesto Fernández – mastering, mixing (5)
- Hector Guerrero – mastering, engineering (7), mixing (1–4, 7–10, 12, 13)
- Dave Kutch – mastering (11)
- Luis Barrera – mastering, mixing (14)
- Adrián Pieragostino – mixing (1–4, 7–10, 12, 13); engineering, editing (4)
- Jesse Ray Ernster – mixing (6, 11)
- Carlos A. Molina – vocal production (all tracks), engineering (7, 16)
- Paulo Uribe – engineering (16), engineering assistance (14)
- Alejandro "Ramalejo" Ramirez – engineering (16)
- Stephanie D'Arcy – engineering assistance (4, 7, 9)
- Jackson Haile – engineering assistance (6, 11)
- Kristina Fisk – engineering assistance (8, 9, 11)
- Rubén Castro – engineering assistance (12)
- Sydney DeLeonardis – engineering assistance (13)
- NamIn Kang – engineering assistance (16)

== Charts ==
Chart performance for Encuentros
Chart (2024)	Peak position
US Regional Mexican Albums (Billboard)	9
US Top Latin Albums (Billboard)	15

== Release history ==
Release history for Encuentros
Region	Date	Format(s)	Label	Ref.
Various	October 10, 2024	digital download; streaming	Kemosabe; RCA	
