= Tiempo Pa Olvidar =

Song by Abraham Mateo and Becky G

Single by Abraham Mateo and Becky G

from the album Sigo a Lo Mío
- Language: Spanish
- English title: "Time To Forget"
- Released: June 19, 2020
- Length: 3:19
- Label: Sony Music Spain
- Songwriter(s): Kevin Mauricio Cruz; Rebbeca Gomez; Andrés Uribe Marín; Lenin Yorney Palacios Machado; Edgar Andino; Juan Camilo Vargas
- Producer(s): Keityn; Ily Wonder; Lexuz

Abraham Mateo singles chronology
"Pegamos Tela" (2020)	"Tiempo Pa Olvidar" (2020)	"Sigo a Lo Mío" (2020)

Becky G singles chronology
"Jolene" (2020)	"Tiempo Pa Olvidar" (2020)	"My Man" (2020)

Music video
- "Tiempo Pa Olvidar" on YouTube

"Tiempo Pa Olvidar" is a song recorded by Spanish singer Abraham Mateo and American singer Becky G. It was released by Sony Music Spain on June 19, 2020, as the third single from Mateo's sixth album Sigo a Lo Mío (2020).

== Music video ==
The music video was released on June 19. It was directed by Mike Ho.

== Charts ==
=== Weekly charts ===
Chart (2020)	Peak position
Mexico Airplay (Billboard)	28
Mexico Espanol Airplay (Billboard)	10
US Latin Airplay (Billboard)	38
US Latin Pop Airplay (Billboard)	7
US Latin Rhythm Airplay (Billboard)	23

=== Year-end charts ===
Chart (2020)	Position
US Latin Pop Airplay Songs (Billboard)	39
