= Muchacha (song) =

2020 single by Gente de Zona and Becky G

Single by Gente de Zona and Becky G

from the album De Menor a Mayor
- Language: Spanish
- English title: "Girl"
- Released: April 23, 2020
- Genre: Reggaeton
- Length: 3:21
- Label: Sony Latin
- Songwriters: Alexander Delgado; Daniel Joel Márquez Díaz; Randy Malcom; Alejandro Arce; Ángel Alberto Arce; Elena Rose; Paul Irizarry Suau; Juan Morelli; Yasmil Jesús Marrufo; Luis Eduardo Cedeno Konig; Roque Alberto Cedeno Konig
- Producers: Echo; Daniel Joel Márquez Díaz; Carlos A. Molina; Alejandro Arce

Gente de Zona singles chronology
"Mejor Sin Ti (Salsa Remix)" (2020)	"Muchacha" (2020)	"La Noche Pinta Buena" (2020)

Becky G singles chronology
"Funk Total: Vai danada" (2020)	"Muchacha" (2020)	"Jolene" (2020)

Music video
- "Muchacha" on YouTube

"Muchacha" is a song by Cuban reggaeton duo Gente de Zona and American singer Becky G. Written by Alexander Delgado, Daniel Joel Márquez Díaz, Randy Malcom, Alejandro Arce, Ángel Alberto Arce, Elena Rose, Paul Irizarry Suau, Juan Morelli, Yasmil Jesús Marrufo, Luis Eduardo Cedeno Konig, Roque Alberto Cedeno Konig, it was released by Sony Latin on April 23, 2020.

== Critical reception ==
Publication	List	Rank	Ref.
Billboard	Best Latin Songs of 2020	—N/a	

== Accolades ==
Awards and nominations for "Muchacha"
Organization	Year	Category	Result	Ref.
Latin Grammy Awards	2020	Best Urban Song	Nominated	
Premio Lo Nuestro	2021	Pop Collaboration of the Year	Nominated	
SESAC Latina Music Awards	2021	Winning Songs	Won	

== Charts ==
=== Weekly charts ===
Chart (2020)	Peak position
Belgium (Ultratip Bubbling Under Flanders)	39
Spain (PROMUSICAE)	82
US Latin Airplay (Billboard)	50
US Latin Rhythm Airplay (Billboard)	22
US Latin Pop Airplay (Billboard)	22
US Tropical Airplay (Billboard)	5

=== Year-end charts ===
Chart (2021)	Position
Venezuela (Monitor Latino)	96

== Certifications ==
Region	Certification	Certified units/sales
Spain (Promusicae)	Platinum	60,000^{‡}
United States (RIAA)	Platinum (Latin)	60,000^{‡}
^{‡} Sales+streaming figures based on certification alone.
