= Baila Así =

2021 song by Play-N-Skillz, Thalía, Becky G

Single by Play-N-Skillz, Thalía, and Becky G featuring Chiquis
- Language: Spanish
- English title: "Dance Like This"
- Released: September 16, 2021
- Length: 2:51
- Label: Sony Latin
- Songwriters: Juan Salinas; Oscar Salinas; Gary Walker Jr.; David Alberto Macias; Steven Maximo Cespedes; Emmanuel Anene; Jose Manuel Del Rosario Rodriguez; Rebbeca Gomez; Ariadna Thalia Sodi Miranda; Janney Marin; Rodolfo Olivares
- Producer: Scott Summers

Play-N-Skillz singles chronology
"Tranki" (2021)	"Baila Así" (2021)	"Chikitita" (2021)

Thalía singles chronology
"Cancelado" (2021)	"Baila Así" (2021)	"Psycho Bitch" (2022)

Becky G singles chronology
"Mal de Amores" (2021)	"Baila Así" (2021)	"Pa Mis Muchachas" (2021)

Chiquis singles chronology
"Mi Problema" (2021)	"Baila Así" (2021)	"Cualquiera" (2021)

Music video
- "Baila Así" on YouTube

"Baila Así" is a song by American DJ group duo Play-N-Skillz, Mexican singer Thalía and American singer Becky G, featuring fellow American singer Chiquis. It was released by Sony Music Latin on September 16, 2021.

== Music video ==
The music video was released on January 24, 2022. It was directed by Michael Garcia.

== Accolades ==
Awards and nominations for "Baila Así"
Organization	Year	Category	Result	Ref.
Lo Nuestro Awards	2023	Urban Dance/Pop Song of the Year	Nominated	

== Charts ==
Chart (2021)	Peak position
US Latin Digital Song Sales (Billboard)	24
US Latin Pop Digital Song Sales (Billboard)	8

=== Year-end charts ===
Chart (2022)	Position
Costa Rica Urbano (Monitor Latino)	99

== Certifications and sales ==
Certifications and sales for "Baila Así"
Region	Certification	Certified units/sales
United States (RIAA)	Gold (Latin)	30,000^{‡}
^{‡} Sales+streaming figures based on certification alone.
