= Mercedes (Becky G and Oscar Maydon song) =

Single by Becky G and Óscar Maydon

from the album Encuentros
- Language: Spanish
- Released: April 11, 2024
- Studio: Just for the Record (Sun Valley, CA)
- Genre: Regional Mexican; corrido tumbado
- Length: 2:48
- Label: Kemosabe; RCA
- Songwriters: Rebbeca Marie Gomez; Sara Schell; Hector Guerrero
- Producers: Hector Guerrero; Sarah Schell

Becky G singles chronology
"Por el Contrario" (2023)	"Mercedes" (2024)	"Tonight" (2024)

Óscar Maydon singles chronology
"Viaje A Paris" (2024)	"Mercedes" (2024)	"Volver Al Futuro" (2024)

Music video
- "Mercedes" on YouTube

"Mercedes" (stylized in all caps) is a song recorded by Mexican American singer Becky G and Mexican singer Óscar Maydon. The song was written by Gomez, Sara Schell and Hector Guerrero. It was released by Kemosabe Records and RCA Records on April 11, 2024, as the lead single from Gomez's fourth studio album, Encuentros.

== Music video ==
The music video was released on April 11. It was directed by Jared Malik Royal. Actor Danny Ramirez appears in the music video as Gomez's love interest.

== Live performances ==
Gomez and Maydon performed the song together live for the first time at the Latin American Music Awards 2024 on April 25, 2024.

== Accolades ==
Awards and nominations for "Mercedes"
Organization	Year	Category	Result	Ref.
Lo Nuestro Awards	2025	Collaboration of the Year – Mexican Music	Nominated	
Lo Nuestro Awards	2025	Mexican Fusion Music of the Year	Nominated	

== Charts ==
Chart performance for "Mercedes"
Chart (2024)	Peak position
US Latin Airplay (Billboard)	4
US Regional Mexican Airplay (Billboard)	1

== Certifications ==
Region	Certification	Certified units/sales
Mexico (AMPROFON)	Gold	70,000^{‡}
^{‡} Sales+streaming figures based on certification alone.

== Release history ==
Release dates and formats for "Mercedes"
Region	Date	Format	Label	Ref.
Various	April 11, 2024	Digital download; streaming	Kemosabe; RCA	
