= Otro Capítulo =

Single by Becky G

from the album Encuentros
- Language: Spanish
- English title: "Next Chapter"
- Released: October 9, 2024
- Studio: Just for the Record (Sun Valley, CA)
- Genre: Cumbia; Tex-Mex; Norteño
- Length: 3:01
- Label: Kemosabe; RCA
- Songwriters: Rebbeca Marie Gomez; Édgar Barrera; Elena Rose; Aldo Vargas; Eduardo Mosquera; Luis Miguel Gómez Castaño
- Producers: Casta; Édgar Barrera

Becky G singles chronology
"Bluetooth" (2024)	"Otro Capítulo" (2024)	"Candy Gum" (2025)

Music video
- "Otro Capítulo" on YouTube

"Otro Capítulo" (stylized in all caps) is a song recorded by American singer Becky G. It was released by Kemosabe Records and RCA Records on October 9, 2024, as the third and final single from Gomez's fourth studio album, Encuentros.

== Background and composition ==
The song was inspired by one of Gomez's musical influences, Selena Quintanilla. Co-written by Gomez, Édgar Barrera, Elena Rose, Aldo Vargas, Eduardo Mosquera and Luis Miguel Gómez Castaño, the song contains elements of Tex-Mex, norteño, and cumbia. It uses a sample of Panamanian group La Factoría and Eddy Lover's song "Perdóname". Gomez sings: "Si alguna vez sentiste algo lindo por mí / Es hora que hagamos lo que quieras, baby / Si alguna vez sentiste algo lindo por mí / No perdamos tiempo, aunque yo sé que," giving a second chance to a past lover.

== Music video ==
The music video was released on October 11. It was directed by Pietro Biz Biasia, and shot in Los Angeles, with cameos from Gomez's family and local businesses, including fashion brand Ghetto Rodeo, Bravo's Charburgers, Veronica's Kitchen, and others.

== Charts ==
Chart (2024)	Peak position
US Latin Digital Song Sales (Billboard)	5

== Release history ==
Release dates and formats for "Otro Capítulo"
Region	Date	Format	Label	Ref.
Various	October 9, 2024	Digital download; streaming	Kemosabe; RCA	
