= Por el Contrario =

- Artwork used for the Demo and Acapella versions, released in August 2024

Single by Becky G, Ángela Aguilar and Leonardo Aguilar

from the album Esquinas and Encuentros
- Language: Spanish
- English title: "On the Contrary"
- Released: December 13, 2023
- Recorded: 2020
- Genre: Mariachi
- Length: 3:05
- Label: Kemosabe; RCA
- Songwriters: Édgar Barrera; Kevyn Mauricio Cruz; Elena Rose; Rebbeca Marie Gomez
- Producer: Édgar Barrera

Becky G singles chronology
"Amigos" (2023)	"Por el Contrario" (2023)	"Mercedes" (2024)

Ángela Aguilar singles chronology
"Celebrando a México" (2023)	"Por el Contrario" (2023)	"Troca" (2024)

Leonardo Aguilar singles chronology
"El Viejo Joven" (2023)	"Por el Contrario" (2023)	"25 Rosas" (2024)

Music video
- "Por el Contrario" (Performance Video) on YouTube

"Por el Contrario" is a song by American singer Becky G and Mexican-American singers Ángela Aguilar and Leonardo Aguilar, from the former's third studio album Esquinas (2023). It was released via Kemosabe and RCA Records on December 13, 2023, as the fourth and final single from the album, due to its success and fan requests, promoted with a music video. On August 7, 2024, Gomez released the demo and acapella versions, with the latter appearing on her fourth studio album Encuentros (2024). The song was nominated for Best Regional Mexican Song at the 25th Annual Latin Grammy Awards.

== Music video ==
The song received a video titled "Por el Contrario (Performance Video)" which was directed by Karla Read and released on December 13, 2023. Set against a desert backdrop that pulls inspiration from José María Velasco, the artists are dressed in a rich red wine color. They sing to the camera (the viewers) and are accompanied by eight musicians from Mariachi Paredes de Tejastitlán (the University of Texas at Austin).

== Live performances ==
Gomez and the Aguilar siblings performed the song for the first time at a Los Angeles show during the Jaripeo Sin Fronteras Tour, a concert series by the Aguilars and their father Pepe Aguilar. They performed the song again at the Latin Grammy Awards on November 14, 2024, wearing similar outfits to those used in the music video.

== Track listing ==
- Streaming/digital download
1. "Por el Contrario (Demo)" – 3:17
2. "Por el Contrario (Acapella)" – 3:03
3. "Por el Contrario" – 3:05

== Accolades ==
Awards and nominations for "Por el Contrario"
Organization	Year	Category	Result	Ref.
ASCAP Latin Music Awards	2025	Winning Songwriters & Publishers (Note: Awards and nominations Kevyn Cruz (Keityn) has received as songwriter.)	Won	
Grammy Awards	2025	Songwriter of the Year, Non-Classical (Note: Awards and nominations Édgar Barrera has received as songwriter.)	Nominated	
Latin Grammy Awards	2024	Best Regional Mexican Song (Note: Awards and nominations Édgar Barrera, Kevyn Mauricio Cruz, Becky G and Elena Rose have received as songwriters.)	Nominated	
Latin Grammy Awards	2024	Songwriter of the Year (Note: Awards and nominations Édgar Barrera has received as songwriter.)	Won	
Lo Nuestro Awards	2025	Song of the Year	Nominated	
Lo Nuestro Awards	2025	The Perfect Mix of the Year	Nominated	
Lo Nuestro Awards	2025	Song of the Year – Mexican Music	Nominated	
Lo Nuestro Awards	2025	Mariachi/Ranchera Song of the Year	Won	
Premios Juventud	2024	Best Regional Mexican Fusion	Nominated	
Premios Juventud	2024	The Perfect Collab	Nominated	
Ritmo Latino Entertainment Awards	2025	Favorite Music Video	Nominated	

== Charts ==
Chart performance for "Por el Contrario"
Chart (2023–2024)	Peak position
Argentina Hot 100 (Billboard)	69
Bolivia (Billboard)	11
Ecuador (Billboard)	19
US Bubbling Under Hot 100 (Billboard)	18
US Hot Latin Songs (Billboard)	17
US Latin Airplay (Billboard)	1
US Regional Mexican Airplay (Billboard)	1

== Certifications ==
Certifications for "Por el Contrario"
Region	Certification	Certified units/sales
Mexico (AMPROFON)	4× Platinum+Gold	630,000^{‡}
United States (RIAA)	Platinum	1,000,000^{‡}
^{‡} Sales+streaming figures based on certification alone.

== Release history ==
Release history for "Por el Contrario"
Region	Date	Format(s)	Label	Version	Ref.
Various	December 13, 2023	Digital download; streaming	Kemosabe; RCA	Original	
Various	August 7, 2024	Digital download; streaming	Kemosabe; RCA	Demo and Acapella	
