= Booty (C. Tangana and Becky G song) =

Single by C. Tangana and Becky G
- Language: Spanish; English
- Released: October 24, 2018
- Genre: Reggaeton
- Length: 2:53
- Label: Sony Spain
- Songwriters: Antón Álvarez Alfaro; Rebbeca Gomez; Cristian Quirante Catalán; Manuel Fernández; Bruno Valverde; Hajar Sbihi; Daniel Cala Bernardez
- Producer: Alizzz

C. Tangana singles chronology
"Bien Duro" (2018)	"Booty" (2018)	"Un Veneno" (2018)

Becky G singles chronology
"Pienso en Ti" (2018)	"Booty" (2018)	"Bubalu" (2018)

Music video
- "Booty" on YouTube

"Booty" is a Spanish-English song by Spanish rapper C. Tangana and American singer Becky G. It was released by Sony Spain on October 24, 2018. "Booty" was certified double platinum in Spain and triple platinum in the United States. Its music video was nominated for Best Music Video at the 2020 Premios Odeón.

== Accolades ==
Awards and nominations for "Booty"
Organization	Year	Category	Result	Ref.
Premios Odeón	2020	Best Music Video	Nominated	

== Charts ==
Weekly chart performance for "Booty"
Chart (2018)	Peak position
Argentina (Argentina Hot 100)	66
Colombia (National-Report)	80
Ecuador (National-Report)	16
Spain (PROMUSICAE)	3

=== Year-end charts ===
Year-end chart performance for "Booty"
Chart (2018)	Position
Spain (PROMUSICAE)	93
Spain (PROMUSICAE)	58

== Certifications ==
Certifications and sales for "Booty"
Region	Certification	Certified units/sales
Mexico (AMPROFON)	Platinum	60,000^{‡}
Spain (Promusicae)	3× Platinum	120,000^{‡}
United States (RIAA)	4× Platinum (Latin)	240,000^{‡}
^{‡} Sales+streaming figures based on certification alone.
