= Lost in the Middle of Nowhere =

2018 song by Kane Brown featuring Becky G

Song by Kane Brown featuring Becky G

from the album Experiment
- Released: November 9, 2018
- Genre: Country; pop
- Length: 3:09
- Label: RCA Nashville
- Songwriters: Kane Brown; Jesse Frasure; Jon Nite; Lauren Alaina
- Producer: Dann Huff

Music video
- "Lost in the Middle of Nowhere (English Version)" on YouTube

"Lost in the Middle of Nowhere" is a song by American singer Kane Brown featuring American singer Becky G. It was written by Brown, Jesse Frasure, Jon Nite and Lauren Alaina, and produced by Dann Huff. It was released as the thirteenth track on Brown's album Experiment, on November 9, 2018.

== Spanish Remix ==
A Spanish version of the song was released as a single on March 29, 2019, alongside its music video. Brown's verse, pre-chorus, the post-choruses and the first half of the bridge remain in English, while the rest of the song was adapted to Spanish by songwriter Mario Cáceres.

== Music video ==
The music video, directed by Alex Alvga, was released on March 29, 2019. It uses the Spanish version of the song, while the original track is used for the Behind the Scenes video. As of February 2026, the Spanish remix has accumulated over 67 million views, while the English version has reached 17 million.

"Lost in the Middle of Nowhere (Spanish Remix)"

Single by Kane Brown featuring Becky G
- Released: March 29, 2019
- Genre: Latin pop; country
- Length: 3:09
- Label: RCA Nashville
- Lyricist: Mario Cáceres
- Producers: Dann Huff; Jon Leone

Music video
- "Lost in the Middle of Nowhere (Spanish Remix)" on YouTube

== Accolades ==
Awards and nominations for "Lost in the Middle of Nowhere"
Organization	Year	Category	Result	Ref.
Latin American Music Awards	2019	Favorite Pop/Rock Song	Nominated	
Premios Juventud	2019	This Is a BTS (Best Behind the Scenes)	Nominated	

== Charts ==
Chart performance for "Lost in the Middle of Nowhere"
Chart (2018–19)	Peak position
US Bubbling Under Hot 100 (Billboard)	24
US Hot Country Songs (Billboard)	39
US Hot Latin Songs (Billboard)	13

== Certifications ==
Region	Certification	Certified units/sales
Canada (Music Canada)	Gold	40,000^{‡}
United States (RIAA)	Gold	500,000^{‡}
^{‡} Sales+streaming figures based on certification alone.
