= Que Haces =

Single by Becky G and Manuel Turizo
- Language: Spanish
- Released: May 9, 2025
- Genre: Merengue; bachata
- Length: 2:52
- Label: Kemosabe; RCA
- Songwriters: Rebbeca Marie Gomez; Manuel Turizo; Manuel Lorente Freire; Alejandro Robledo Valencia; Daniel Rondón; Cristian Camilo Alvarez Ospina
- Producers: Nup; Ciey

Becky G singles chronology
"Candy Gum" (2025)	"Que Haces" (2025)	"Marathon" (2026)

Manuel Turizo singles chronology
"En Privado" (2025)	"Que Haces" (2025)	"Cómo Sería" (2025)

Music video
- "Que Haces" on YouTube

"Que Haces" (stylized in all caps) is a song recorded by American singer Becky G and Colombian singer Manuel Turizo. It was released by Kemosabe and RCA Records on May 9, 2025. The song was written by Gomez, Manuel Lorente Freire, Alejandro Robledo Valencia, Daniel Rondón and Cristian Camilo Alvarez Ospina.

== Music video ==
The music video was released on May 9. It was directed by Joey Breese and Joey Barba. The number on one of the apartments is 512, a reference to the song "El Chico del Apartamento 512" by late Tejano singer Selena.

== Live performances ==
Gomez and Turizo performed the song together live for the first time at the American Music Awards on May 26, 2025.

== Charts ==
Chart performance for "Que Haces"
Chart (2025)	Peak position
Argentina Hot 100 (Billboard)	54
Central America (Monitor Latino)	17
Costa Rica (Monitor Latino)	16
El Salvador (Monitor Latino)	4
Guatemala (Monitor Latino)	9
Panama (PRODUCE)	50
Puerto Rico (Monitor Latino)	5
Spain (PROMUSICAE)	44
Spain Airplay (TopHit)	62
Uruguay (Monitor Latino)	13
US Hot Latin Songs (Billboard)	35
US Hot Tropical Songs (Billboard)	3
US Latin Airplay (Billboard)	18
US Latin Digital Song Sales (Billboard)	2
US Tropical Airplay (Billboard)	2
Venezuela (Monitor Latino)	13

== Certifications ==
Region	Certification	Certified units/sales
Spain (Promusicae)	Platinum	100,000^{‡}
^{‡} Sales+streaming figures based on certification alone.

== Release history ==
Release dates and formats for "Que Haces"
Region	Date	Format	Label	Ref.
Various	May 9, 2025	Digital download; streaming	Kemosabe; RCA	
