= Óscar Maydon =

Mexican singer

- Born: Óscar René Maydon Meza; 20 September 1999 (age 26); Mexicali, Baja California, Mexico
- Occupation: Singer
- Years active: 2018–present
- Height: 1.78 m (5 ft 10 in)
- Musical career
- Genres: Regional Mexican; corridos tumbados
- Labels: Rancho Humilde; Sony Latin

Óscar René Maydon Meza (born 20 September 1999) is a Mexican singer-songwriter from Mexicali. He began his music career in 2018 and in 2020 signed with Rancho Humilde in 2021, later releasing his debut studio album GXLE <3 (2021) through the label. In 2023, he earned his first US Billboard Hot 100 entry with "Fin de Semana" with fellow Mexican singer Junior H, later releasing his second studio album Distorsión at the end of the year. Along with the aforementioned single, two of his other singles, "Madonna" with Natanael Cano and "Tu Boda" with Fuerza Regida, have peaked within the top 10 of the US Hot Latin Songs chart.

== Life and career ==
Maydon was born on 20 September 1999 in Mexicali, Baja California, Mexico. He began his music career in July 2020 by publishing one of his first songs, which was titled "De la Nació", through G24 Records. The release of the song caught the attention of Jimmy Humilde who signed him onto his record label, Rancho Humilde. His first song under the label was the 2021 single "En el Espacio" with regional Mexican band Legado 7, further releasing duets with Natanael Cano and Polo González.

On 18 March 2022, Maydon released his debut studio album GXLE <3. On 13 January 2023, he released "Fin de Semana", a duet with fellow Mexican singer Junior H. It debuted at number 86 on the US Billboard Hot 100, earning Maydon his first entry on the chart. On 22 December 2023, he released his second studio album Distorsión (2023), containing guest appearances from Natanael Cano and Gabito Ballesteros, among others.

== Discography ==
=== Studio albums ===
- GXLE <3 (2022)
- Distorsión (2023)
- Rico o Muerto, Vol. 1 (2025)

=== Singles ===
List of singles, with selected chart positions, certifications, and album name
Title	Year	Peak chart positions				Certifications	Album
Title	Year	MEX	US	US Latin	WW	Certifications	Album
"De La Nació"	2020	—	—	—	—		Non-album singles
"En El Espacio" (feat. Legado 7)	2021	—	—	—	—		Non-album singles
"El Instagram"	2021	—	—	—	—		Non-album singles
"La Noche Empieza" (with Natanael Cano)	2021	—	—	—	—		Non-album singles
"Vacío"	2021	—	—	—	—		Non-album singles
"Finta De Fresa" (with Polo González)	2021	—	—	—	—		GXLE <3
"Kilos De H"	2022	—	—	—	—		Non-album singles
"Fly Club Quemando"	2022	—	—	—	—		Non-album singles
"Porte Placoso" (with Ivan Orozco)	2022	—	—	—	—		GXLE <3
"El Buda" (with Calle 24)	2022	—	—	—	—		Non-album singles
"El JR 01" (with Justin Morales)	2022	—	—	—	—		Non-album singles
"El Calorcito" (En Vivo) (with El Chachito)	2022	—	—	—	—		Non-album singles
"Los Collares" (En Vivo) (with El Padrinito Toys)	2022	—	—	—	—		Non-album singles
"Hoy" (with Manuel Rodriguez)	2022	—	—	—	—		Non-album singles
"Me Gusta Lo Bueno" (En Vivo)	2022	—	—	—	—		Non-album singles
"Porque No Esta De Más" (En Vivo) (with Victor Cibrian)	2022	—	—	—	—		Non-album singles
"Hágase Hombre" (with El Padrinito Toys)	2022	—	—	—	—		Non-album singles
"Kilos De H" (En Vivo) (with Natanael Cano)	2022	—	—	—	—		Non-album singles
"Fin de Semana" (with Junior H)	2023	4	86	10	58		Non-album singles
"Falso"	2023	—	—	—	—		Non-album singles
"Una Mentirosa" (with Eslabon Armado)	2023	—	—	—	—		Non-album singles
"Polvito De Limón" (with Gerardo Ortíz)	2023	—	—	—	—		Non-album singles
"El Apoyo" (with El Chachito)	2023	—	—	—	—		Non-album singles
"Anillos" (with Oscar Ortiz)	2023	—	—	—	—		Non-album singles
"Cancún"	2023	—	—	—	—		Non-album singles
"Arriba El Dinero"	2023	—	—	—	—		Non-album singles
"Los Chiquinarcos" (En Vivo) (with Luis R. Conriquez)	2023	—	—	—	—		Non-album singles
"3 Doritos Después" (En Vivo) (with Panter Bélico)	2023	—	—	—	—		Non-album singles
"Mira Jodidón" (with Marca MP)	2023	—	—	—	—		Non-album singles
"Cuerno Mio" (with Junior H)	2023	—	—	—	—	RIAA: Platinum (Latin)	Non-album singles
"Pal Amor Soy Malo" (Remix) (with Adrian L Santos)	2023	—	—	—	—		Non-album singles
"Skin de Bandida" (with Junior H and Gabito Ballesteros)	2023	24	—	50	—		Distorsión
"John Wick" (En Vivo) (with Herencia De Grandes)	2023	—	—	—	—		Non-album singles
"Antídoto" (with Fuerza Regida)	2023	—	—	—	—		Non-album singles
"Hong Kong" (with Victor Mendivil & Alemán)	2023	—	—	—	—		Non-album singles
"Otro Día, Otro Aventura" (with Código FN & Brandon Reyes y Elvin)	2023	—	—	—	—		Non-album singles
"Dame Amor" (Remix) (with Officialalex425)	2023	—	—	—	—		Non-album singles
"Quien Me Cuida No Duerme" (En Vivo) (with El Padrinito Toys)	2023	—	—	—	—		Non-album singles
"F*ck" (with Los Gemelos De Sinaloa)	2023	—	—	—	—		Excentricon
"Tipo Gatsby" (with Natanael Cano & Gabito Ballesteros)	2023	—	—	—	—		Distorsión
"Mexican Flan" (with Codiciado)	2023	—	—	—	—		Distorsión
"Kim Kardashian" (with Tyga)	2023	—	—	—	—		Distorsión
"Elvira" (with Chino Pacas and Gabito Ballesteros)	2023	9	—	24	190	AMPROFON: Platinum+Gold	Distorsión
"Rompe la Dompe" (with Peso Pluma and Junior H)	2023	4	81	12	51		Éxodo
"Anda Bien el Nene" (with Grupo Marca Registrada)	2024	—	—	—	—	AMPROFON: Gold	Non-album singles
"Fresas de la Capital" (Remix) (with Jaque Mate & Legión RG)	2024	—	—	—	—		Non-album singles
"Madonna" (with Natanael Cano)	2024	1	— (Note: "Madonna" did not enter the Billboard Hot 100, but peaked at number nine on the Bubbling Under Hot 100 chart.)	9	26		Non-album singles
"Don Dimadon" (with Remp & Victor Mendivil)	2024	—	—	—	—		Non-album singles
"Viaje A París" (with Nueva H)	2024	—	—	—	—		Non-album singles
"Mercedes" (with Becky G)	2024	—	—	—	—		Encuentros
"Volver al Futuro" (with Junior H)	2024	1	—	13	69	AMPROFON: Platinum+Gold; RIAA: 5× Platinum (Latin)	Non-album single
"Rococo" (with Gabito Ballesteros)	2024	—	—	—	—		The GB
"Giza" (with Natanael Cano)	2024	7	—	28	—		Non-album singles
"Mejores Jordans" (with Victor Mendivil)	2024	—	—	—	—		Non-album singles
"Tu Boda" (with Fuerza Regida)	2024	1	22	8	4	RIAA: 3× Platinum (Latin)	Rico o Muerto, Vol. 1
"Corridos y Alcohol" (with Steve Aoki)	2024	—	—	—	—		Non-album singles
"¿Qué Te Parece?" (with Grupo Frontera)	2024	—	—	—	—		Non-album singles
"Otra Mentira"	2024	—	—	—	—		Non-album singles
"Bruta" (with El Alfa & Victor Mendivil)	2025	—	—	—	—		Non-album singles
"Amigos? No." (with Netón Vega)	2025	—	—	—	149		Rico o Muerto, Vol. 1
"El Destino Nos Separa" (with Grupo Marca Registrada)	2025	—	—	—	—		Non-album singles
"Ya Fue" (with Luis R. Conriquez & Jorsshh)	2025	—	—	—	—		Non-album singles
"Triple Lavada" (Remix) (with Esau Ortiz, Luis R Conriquez, Alemán & Victor Mendivil)	2025	—	—	—	—		Non-album singles
"Mejores Jordans 2" (with Victor Mendivil)	2025	17	—	—	—		Non-album singles
"Poema" (with J balvin)	2026	—	—	—	172		Non-album singles

==== As featured artist ====
List of singles, and album name
Title	Year	Album
"Llenas Las Cuentas" (Natanael Cano, Dan Sanchez & Justin Morales featuring Óscar Maydon)	2021	A Mis 20
"Estilo Irak" (Yerai R featuring Óscar Maydon)	2022	Non-album single

=== Guest appearances ===
List of non-single guest appearances, with other performing artists, showing year released and album name
Title	Year	Other artist(s)	Album
"Porte Exuberante"	2021	Natanael Cano	A Mis 20
"El MB"	2022	JR Torres	Corridos No Caricaturas
"Llamarte o Bloquerate"	2023	Eslabon Armado	Desvelado
"Santal 33"	2024	Peso Pluma	Éxodo
"40 y 20"	2024	Calle 24	Ondeado$
"Aurora"	2024	Fuerza Regida; Grupo Frontera; Armenta	Mala Mía
"La Piña"	2025	Neton Vega	Mi Vida Mi Muerte
"Cadaver de la Novia"	2025	Gabito Ballesteros	Ya No Se Llevan Serenatas
