= Natti Natasha discography =

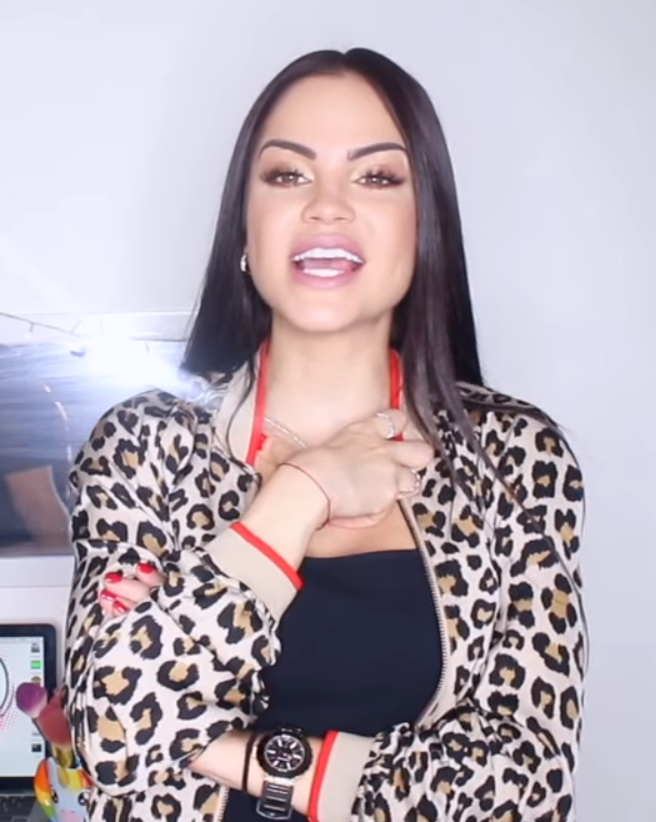
- Natasha in December 2017
- Studio albums: 4
- EPs: 1
- Singles: 68
- Promotional singles: 4

The discography of Dominican singer Natti Natasha consists of three studio albums, one extended play, 68 singles (including 9 as featured artist), and four promotional singles.

Her debut album, Iluminatti, was released on February 15, 2019, by Pina Records and Sony Music Latin. Her second album, Nattividad, was released on September 24, 2021. Her third studio album, Nasty Singles, was released on December 8, 2023. Her fourth album, Natti Natasha en Amargue, was released on February 7, 2025.

== Studio albums ==
List of studio albums, with selected details and chart positions
Title	Studio album details	Peak chart positions				Sales	Certifications
Title	Studio album details	SPA	US	US Latin	US Latin Rhythm	Sales	Certifications
Iluminatti	Released: February 15, 2019; Label: Pina, Sony Latin; Formats: CD, digital download	96	149	3	3	US: 7,000	RIAA: Platinum (Latin)
Nattividad	Released: September 24, 2021; Label: Pina, Sony Latin; Formats: CD, digital download	36	—	14	11		RIAA: Gold (Latin)
Nasty Singles	Released: December 8, 2023; Label: Pina, Sony Latin; Formats: digital download	—	—	—	—		RIAA: Gold (Latin)
Natti Natasha en Amargue	Released: February 7, 2025; Label: Pina, Sony Latin; Formats: CD, digital download	—	—	—	—		

== Extended plays ==
List of extended plays with selected details
Title	Extended play details
All About Me	Released: March 28, 2012; Label: Orfanato Music Group; Format: Digital download; Track list: 1. "About Me" (feat. Nova); 2. "Cinderella" (feat. Chika); 3. "Gone" (feat. Chika); 4. "New Day"; 5. "Pain Killer" (feat. Chika); 6. "Show Off"; 7. "Train to No Where"

== Singles ==
=== As lead artist ===
==== 2010s ====
List of singles released in the 2010s decade as lead artist, showing selected chart positions, certifications, and associated albums
Title	Year	Peak chart positions										Certifications	Album
Title	Year	DR	ARG	ITA	MEX	SPA	SWI	US Bub.	US Latin	US Latin Air.	US Latin Pop	Certifications	Album
"Otra Cosa" (with Daddy Yankee)	2016	1	—	—	—	—	—	—	21	11	11		Non-album singles
"Criminal" (with Ozuna)	2017	1	1	69	48	1	91	1	5	12	16	FIMI: 2× Platinum; PROMUSICAE: 5× Platinum; RIAA: 15× Platinum (Latin)	Non-album singles
"Amantes de una Noche" (with Bad Bunny)	2018	3	73	—	— (Note: "Amantes de una Noche" did not chart on the Billboard Mexico Airplay chart, though did peak at number 33 on the Mexico Espanol Airplay chart.)	48	—	—	25	—	—	PROMUSICAE: Platinum; RIAA: 2× Platinum (Latin)	Non-album singles
"Tonta" (with R.K.M & Ken-Y)	2018	1	67	—	— (Note: "Tonta" did not chart on the Billboard Mexico Airplay chart, though did peak at number 46 on the Mexico Espanol Airplay chart.)	—	—	—	31	49	30		Non-album singles
"Sin Pijama" (with Becky G)	2018	1	7	80	15	1	33	1	4	1	1	AMPROFON: Diamond+4× Platinum+Gold; FIMI: Platinum; IFPI SWI: Gold; PROMUSICAE: 6× Platinum; RIAA: 38× Platinum (Latin); ZPAV: Gold	Mala Santa
"No Me Acuerdo" (with Thalía)	2018	2	5	—	1	5	—	—	14	19	8	AMPROFON: Diamond+Platinum; PROMUSICAE: 3× Platinum; RIAA: 14× Platinum (Latin)	Valiente
"Quién Sabe"	2018	4	66	—	—	—	—	—	36	23	17		Iluminatti
"Justicia" (with Silvestre Dangond)	2018	—	83	—	—	—	—	—	21	1	5	RIAA: 6× Platinum (Latin)	Intruso
"Buena Vida" (with Daddy Yankee)	2018	2	—	—	—	—	—	—	—	—	—		Non-album single
"Me Gusta" (solo or remix with Farruko)	2018	4	—	—	—	—	—	—	13	1	3		Iluminatti
"Lamento Tu Pérdida"	2018	—	—	—	—	—	—	—	—	—	—		Iluminatti
"Pa' Mala Yo"	2019	7	—	—	7	—	—	—	— (Note: "Pa' Mala Yo" did not enter the Hot Latin Songs, but peaked at number 8 on the Billboard Latin Digital Song Sales.)	—	—		Iluminatti
"La Mejor Versión de Mí" (solo or remix with Romeo Santos)	2019	3	70	—	2	89	—	19	10	5	12	PROMUSICAE: 2× Platinum (Remix version); RIAA: Gold (Latin); RIAA: 6× Platinum (Latin) (Remix version)	Iluminatti
"Te Lo Dije" (with Anitta)	2019	—	—	—	—	—	—	—	—	—	—		Iluminatti
"Obsesión"	2019	4	—	—	—	—	—	—	—	—	—		Iluminatti
"Oh Daddy"	2019	1	76	—	10	—	—	—	—	32	16	AMPROFON: Platinum	Iluminatti
"No Lo Trates" (with Pitbull and Daddy Yankee)	2019	—	58	—	— (Note: "No Lo Trates" did not chart on the Billboard Mexico Airplay chart, though did peak at number 18 on the Mexico Espanol Airplay chart.)	60	74	—	15	1	1	PROMUSICAE: Gold; RIAA: 11× Platinum (Latin)	Libertad 548
"No Voy a Llorar"	2019	10	—	—	—	—	—	—	—	—	—		Iluminatti
"Runaway" (with Sebastián Yatra and Daddy Yankee featuring Jonas Brothers)	2019	—	13	—	4	29	96	11	12	1	3	AMPROFON: Diamond+2× Platinum; PROMUSICAE: Gold; RIAA: 7× Platinum (Latin)	Dharma
"Deja Tus Besos" (solo or remix with Chencho Corleone)	2019	—	—	—	—	—	—	—	—	—	—		Iluminatti
"—" denotes releases that did not chart or were not released in that territory.

==== 2020s ====
List of singles released in the 2020s decade as lead artist, showing selected chart positions, certifications, and associated albums
Title	Year	Peak chart positions										Certifications	Album
Title	Year	DR	ARG	ITA	MEX	SPA	US Bub.	US Latin	US Latin Air.	US Latin Pop	US Latin Rhy.	Certifications	Album
"Viene y Va" (with C. Tangana)	2020	—	—	—	— (Note: "Viene y Va" did not chart on the Billboard Mexico Airplay chart, though did peak at number 25 on the Mexico Espanol Airplay chart.)	25	—	—	—	—	—	PROMUSICAE: Gold; RIAA: Gold (Latin)	Non-album singles
"Despacio" (featuring Nicky Jam, Manuel Turizo and Myke Towers)	2020	1	—	—	—	64	—	39	12	12	8		Non-album singles
"Me Estás Matando"	2020	3	—	—	—	—	—	— (Note: "Me Estás Matando" did not enter the Hot Latin Songs, but peaked at number 25 on the Billboard Latin Digital Song Sales.)	—	—	—		Non-album singles
"Fantasías (Remix) (with Rauw Alejandro, Farruko, Anuel AA and Lunay)	2020	3	—	—	—	16	—	—	—	—	—	AMPROFON: Platinum+Gold; PROMUSICAE: Platinum	Non-album singles
"Honey Boo" (with CNCO)	2020	7	62	—	25	—	—	—	21	10	12	AMPROFON: Gold	Non-album singles
"Que Mal Te Fue" (solo or remix featuring Justin Quiles and Miky Woodz)	2020	1	—	—	1	84	—	18	3	—	3		Nattividad
"Te Mueves" (with Zion & Lennox)	2020	—	—	—	48	—	—	— (Note: "Te Mueves" did not enter the Hot Latin Songs, but peaked at number 5 on the Billboard Latin Digital Song Sales.)	32	—	18		El Sistema
"Diosa" (Remix) (with Myke Towers and Anuel AA)	2020	—	—	—	—	35	—	—	—	—	—	PROMUSICAE: Gold; RIAA: Gold (Latin)	Non-album singles
"Ayer Me Llamó Mi Ex" (Remix) (with Khea and Prince Royce featuring Lenny Santos)	2020	—	5	—	—	—	—	33	28	—	17		Non-album singles
"Tanto Que Me Gusta" (with El Mayor Clasico)	2020	—	—	—	—	—	—	—	—	—	—		Non-album singles
"Antes Que Salga El Sol" (with Prince Royce)	2021	—	59	—	15	86	—	19	1	1	—	RIAA: Platinum (Latin)	Nattividad
"Las Nenas" (with Cazzu and Fariana featuring La Duraca)	2021	—	80	—	—	21	—	— (Note: "Las Nenas" did not enter the Hot Latin Songs, but peaked at number 8 on the Billboard Latin Digital Song Sales.)	—	—	—	PROMUSICAE: Platinum; RIAA: Platinum (Latin)	Nattividad
"Ram Pam Pam" (Note: "Ram Pam Pam" is also included on Becky's album Esquemas.) (with Becky G)	2021	—	6	69	5	16	20	12	1	—	1	AMPROFON: Platinum; FIMI: Gold; PROMUSICAE: 2× Platinum; RIAA: 4× Platinum (Latin)	Nattividad
"Philliecito" (with Nio Garcia and Brray)	2021	—	—	—	—	—	—	—	—	—	—		Nattividad
"Noches en Miami"	2021	—	—	—	6	—	—	—	1	1	1		Nattividad
"Imposible Amor" (with Maluma)	2021	—	93	—	2	—	—	34	30	—	15		Nattividad
"No Quiero Saber"	2021	—	—	—	—	—	—	—	—	—	—		Nattividad
"Fue Tu Culpa" (featuring Fran Rozzano)	2021	—	—	—	—	—	—	—	—	—	—		Nattividad
"Arrebatá"	2021	—	—	—	—	—	—	—	—	—	—		Nattividad
"Yummy Yummy Love" (with Momoland)	2022	—	—	—	45	—	—	—	—	—	—		Non-album single
"Wow BB" (with El Alfa and Chimbala)	2022	20	—	—	—	—	—	27	10	—	6	RIAA: Platinum (Latin)	Nasty Singles
"Mayor Que Usted" (with Daddy Yankee and Wisin & Yandel)	2022	1	—	—	1	—	—	29	1	—	1	AMPROFON: Gold; RIAA: Platinum (Latin)	Nasty Singles
"Tiempo" (with Wisin)	2022	—	—	—	—	—	—	— (Note: "Tiempo" did not enter the Hot Latin Songs, but peaked at number 23 on the Billboard Latin Digital Song Sales.)	40	—	17		Non-album single
"Lokita" (with María Becerra)	2022	—	50	—	—	—	—	—	45	—	17		Nasty Singles
"To' Esto Es Tuyo"	2022	—	—	—	—	—	—	— (Note: "To' Esto Es Tuyo" did not enter the Hot Latin Songs, but peaked at number 24 on the Billboard Latin Digital Song Sales.)	23	—	10		Nasty Singles
"En Bajita" (with Justin Quiles and Omar Courtz)	2023	—	—	—	—	—	—	—	—	—	—		Non-album single
"Algarete"	2023	—	—	—	—	—	—	—	—	—	20		Nasty Singles
"La Falta Que Me Haces"	2023	—	—	—	—	—	—	—	6	—	—		Nasty Singles
"No Pare" (solo or remix featuring Tokischa)	2023	—	—	—	—	—	—	—	—	—	22		Nasty Singles
"Ya No Te Extraño"	2023	—	—	—	—	—	—	—	8	—	4		Nasty Singles
"Tu Perrota"	2024	—	—	—	—	—	—	—	—	—	—		Nasty Singles
"Otro Caption"	2024	—	—	—	—	—	—	—	—	—	—		Nasty Singles
"Cuando Cierre La Disco" (with Chris Lebron)	2024	—	—	—	—	—	—	—	—	—	—		Non-album singles
"Delicuente" (with Chimbala and Jey One)	2024	—	—	—	—	—	—	—	—	—	—		Non-album singles
"Quiéreme Menos"	2024	—	—	—	—	—	—	— (Note: "Quiéreme Menos" did not enter the Hot Latin Songs, but peaked at number 7 on the Billboard Latin Digital Song Sales.)	21	—	—		Natti Natasha en Amargue
"Como La Flor" (with Play-N-Skillz and Deorro)	2024	—	—	—	—	—	—	— (Note: "Como La Flor" did not enter the Hot Latin Songs, but peaked at number 10 on the Billboard Latin Digital Song Sales.)	25	2	—		Non-album single
"Tu Loca"	2024	—	—	—	—	—	—	—	24	—	—		Natti Natasha en Amargue
"Born to Love Ya" (with Gabry Ponte and Sean Paul)	2024	—	50	—	—	—	—	—	—	45	—		Non-album single
"Escasez De Besos"	2024	—	—	—	—	—	—	—	—	—	—		Natti Natasha en Amargue
"Desde Hoy"	2025	—	—	—	—	—	—	45	1	—	—		Natti Natasha en Amargue
"Dem Bow" (with Nando Boom)	2025	—	—	—	—	—	—	32	1	—	1		Non-album single
"—" denotes releases that did not chart or were not released in that territory.

=== As featured artist ===
List of singles as featured artist, with selected chart positions and certifications, showing year released and album name
Title	Year	Peak chart positions							Certifications	Album
Title	Year	MEX	SPA	SWI	US Latin	US Latin Air.	US Latin Pop	US Latin Rhy.	Certifications	Album
"Dutty Love" (Don Omar featuring Natti Natasha)	2012	— (Note: "Dutty Love" did not chart on the Billboard Mexico Airplay chart, though did peak at number 35 on the Mexico Espanol Airplay chart.)	—	—	1	1	1	1	PROMUSICAE: Platinum	Don Omar Presents MTO²: New Generation
"Crazy in Love" (Farruko featuring Natti Natasha)	2013	—	—	—	—	—	—	17		Non-album single
"Perdido en Tus Ojos" (Don Omar featuring Natti Natasha)	2015	— (Note: "Perdido en Tus Ojos" did not chart on the Billboard Mexico Airplay chart, though did peak at number 50 on the Mexico Espanol Airplay chart.)	22	—	13	5	7	4	PROMUSICAE: Platinum	The Last Don II
"Bonnie & Clyde" (Cosculluela featuring Natti Natasha)	2018	—	—	—	—	—	—	—		Non-album singles
"Instagram" (Dimitri Vegas & Like Mike, David Guetta and Daddy Yankee featuring Natti Natasha and Afro Bros)	2019	—	63	53	— (Note: "Instagram" did not enter the Hot Latin Songs, but peaked at number 6 on the Billboard Latin Digital Song Sales.)	—	—	—	AMPROFON: Platinum	Non-album singles
"Loco" (Remix) (Beéle featuring Natti Natasha, Farruko and Manuel Turizo)	2020	—	48	—	— (Note: "Loco (Remix)" did not enter the Hot Latin Songs, but peaked at number 18 on the Billboard Latin Digital Song Sales.)	—	—	—	PROMUSICAE: Gold; RIAA: 4× Platinum(Latin)	Non-album singles
"El Royce" (Dímelo Flow, Sech, Justin Quiles, Lenny Tavárez and Dalex featuring Natti Natasha and iZaak)	2024	—	—	—	—	—	—	—		The Academy: Segunda Misión
"Mil Palabras" (DJ Luian and Mambo Kingz featuring Jay Wheeler, Natti Natasha and Luar La L)	2024	—	—	—	—	—	—	22		Non-album singles
"To The Beat" (Dimitri Vegas & Like Mike, Regard, & Sash! featuring Natti Natasha)	2024	—	—	—	—	—	—	—		Non-album singles
"—" denotes releases that did not chart or were not released in that territory.

=== Promotional singles ===
List of promotional singles
Title	Year	Certifications	Album
"Makossa"	2013		Non-album promotional single
"Soy Mía" (featuring Kany García)	2018	AMPROFON: Gold	Iluminatti
"Andale"	2023		Nasty Singles
"Tu Tattoo"	2023		Nasty Singles

== Other charted songs ==
List of singles as featured artist, with chart positions, showing year released
Title	Year	Peak chart positions						Certifications	Album
Title	Year	ARG	MEX	SPA	US Latin	US Latin Pop	US Latin Rhy.	Certifications	Album
"Tus Movimientos" (Don Omar featuring Natti Natasha)	2012	—	—	—	— (Note: "Tus Movimientos" did not enter the Hot Latin Songs, but peaked at number 50 on the Billboard Latin Digital Song Sales.)	—	9		Don Omar Presents MTO²: New Generation
"Dura" (Remix) (Daddy Yankee featuring Natti Natasha, Becky G and Bad Bunny)	2018	11	—	1	2	—	—	PROMUSICAE: 2× Platinum	Non-album song
"Sígueme Los Pasos" (Ozuna featuring J Balvin and Natti Natasha)	2018	—	—	99	37	—	—		Aura
"Era Necesario"	2019	—	—	—	— (Note: "Era Necesario" did not enter the Hot Latin Songs, but peaked at number 22 on the Billboard Latin Digital Song Sales.)	—	—		Iluminatti
"DJ No Pare" (Remix) (Justin Quiles featuring Natti Natasha, Farruko, Zion, Dalex and Lenny Tavárez)	2019	17	— (Note: "DJ No Pare (Remix)" did not chart on the Billboard Mexico Airplay chart, though did peak at number 19 on the Mexico Espanol Airplay chart.)	—	— (Note: "DJ No Pare (Remix)" did not enter the Hot Latin Songs, but peaked at number 21 on the Billboard Latin Digital Song Sales.)	33	—	RIAA: Platinum (Latin)	Non-album song
"Bellaquita" (Remix) (Dalex, Lenny Tavárez and Anitta featuring Natti Natasha, Farruko and Justin Quiles)	2019	—	—	26	—	—	—	PROMUSICAE: Platinum	Modo Avión
"Otro Mundo"	2021	—	—	—	—	20	—		Non-album song
"Zona del Perreo" (with Daddy Yankee and Becky G)	2022	—	—	73	32	—	—		Legendaddy
"—" denotes releases that did not chart or were not released in that territory.

== Guest appearances ==
List of other album appearances
Title	Year	Other artist(s)	Album
"Te Dijeron" (Remix)	2012	Plan B, Don Omar and Syko el Terror	Non-album song
"Te Falto El Valor"	2015	Tony Dize	La Melodía de la Calle: 3rd Season
"Amor De Locos"	2016	Ken-Y	The King of Romance
"Tu Magia"	2016	Lápiz Conciente	Latidos
"El Baño" (Remix)	2018	Enrique Iglesias and Bad Bunny	Non-album songs
"Zum Zum" (Remix)	2018	Plan B, Daddy Yankee, R.K.M & Ken-Y and Arcángel	Non-album songs
"Impaciente" (Remix)	2019	Chencho Corleone and Justin Quiles	Non-album songs
"Loco Contigo" (Remix)	2019	DJ Snake, J Balvin, Tyga, Ozuna, Nicky Jam, Darell and Sech	Carte Blanche
"Diablo En Mujer"	2020	Yandel, Myke Towers and Darell	Quién Contra Mí 2
"Baby, I'm Jealous" (Remix)	2020	Bebe Rexha and Doja Cat	Non-album songs
"Natti, Karol, Becky" (Remix)	2021	Jon Z, Farruko, Brytiago, Darell, Eladio Carrión, Kevvo and Miky Woodz	Non-album songs
"Mama Wanna Mambo"	2022	Meghan Trainor and Arturo Sandoval	Takin' It Back
