= List of awards and nominations received by Natti Natasha =

Natti Natasha awards and nominations
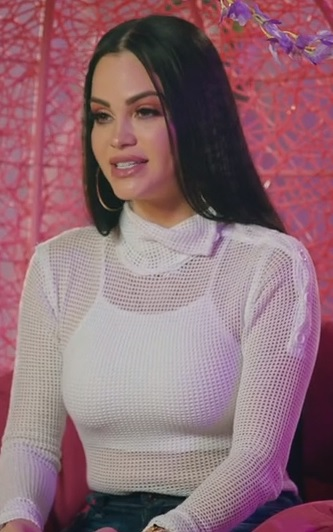
- Natasha in 2019
Awards and nominations
Award	Wins	Nominations
American Music Awards	0	2
Billboard Latin Music Awards	1	7
Latin American Music Awards	0	8

Totals (Note: Certain award groups do not simply award one winner. They acknowledge several different recipients, have runners-up, and have third place. Since this is a specific recognition and is different from losing an award, runner-up mentions are considered wins in this award tally. For simplification and to avoid errors, each award in this list has been presumed to have had a prior nomination.)
- Wins: 25
- Nominations: 119

Dominican singer Natti Natasha has received many awards and nominations throughout her career.

== Awards and nominations ==
Name of the award ceremony, year presented, recipient of the award, category and result
Award	Year (Note: Indicates the year of ceremony. Each year is linked to the article about the awards held that year, wherever possible.)	Recipient(s) and nominee(s)	Category	Result	Ref.
American Music Awards	2021	Natti Natasha	Favorite Female Artist – Latin	Nominated	
American Music Awards	2026	Natti Natasha	Best Female Latin Artist	Nominated	
ASCAP Latin Music Awards	2020	"Me Gusta"	Winning Songs (Note: Awards and nominations Natasha has received as songwriter.)	Won	
ASCAP Latin Music Awards	2020	"No Lo Trates"	Winning Songs	Won	
ASCAP Latin Music Awards	2022	"Ram Pam Pam"	Winning Songs	Won	
ASCAP Latin Music Awards	2023	"Mayor Que Usted"	Winning Songs	Won	
Billboard Latin Music Awards	2018	Natti Natasha	Female Hot Latin Songs Artist of the Year	Nominated	
Billboard Latin Music Awards	2019	Natti Natasha	New Artist of the Year	Nominated	
Billboard Latin Music Awards	2019	Natti Natasha	Female Hot Latin Songs Artist of the Year	Won	
Billboard Latin Music Awards	2020	Natti Natasha	Female Hot Latin Songs Artist of the Year	Nominated	
Billboard Latin Music Awards	2020	Natti Natasha	Female Top Latin Albums Artist of the Year	Nominated	
Billboard Latin Music Awards	2021	Natti Natasha	Female Hot Latin Songs Artist of the Year	Nominated	
Billboard Latin Music Awards	2022	Natti Natasha	Female Top Latin Albums Artist of the Year	Nominated	
Billboard Latin Women in Music	2025	Natti Natasha	Unstoppable Artist Award	Won	
Guinness World Records	2019	Natti Natasha	Most Premio Lo Nuestro nominations in a single year (female)	Won	
Heat Latin Music Awards	2018	Natti Natasha	Best Female Artist	Nominated	
Heat Latin Music Awards	2018	"Criminal"	Best Collaboration	Nominated	
Heat Latin Music Awards	2019	Natti Natasha	Best Female Artist	Nominated	
Heat Latin Music Awards	2020	Natti Natasha	Best Female Artist	Nominated	
Heat Latin Music Awards	2020	"La Mejor Versión de Mí"	Best Collaboration	Nominated	
Heat Latin Music Awards	2021	Natti Natasha	Best Female Artist	Nominated	
Heat Latin Music Awards	2021	Natti Natasha	Best Urbano Dominican Artist	Nominated	
Heat Latin Music Awards	2021	"Antes Que Salga El Sol"	Best Collaboration	Nominated	
Heat Latin Music Awards	2022	Natti Natasha	Best Urbano Dominican Artist	Nominated	
Heat Latin Music Awards	2023	Natti Natasha	Best Female Artist	Nominated	
Latin American Music Awards	2018	Natti Natasha	Favorite Female Artist	Nominated	
Latin American Music Awards	2019	Natti Natasha	Favorite Female Artist	Nominated	
Latin American Music Awards	2021	Natti Natasha	Favorite Female Artist	Nominated	
Latin American Music Awards	2022	Natti Natasha	Favorite Female Artist	Nominated	
Latin American Music Awards	2023	Natti Natasha	Favorite Urban Artist	Nominated	
Latin American Music Awards	2023	"Mayor Que Usted"	Collaboration of the Year	Nominated	
Latin American Music Awards	2023	"Mayor Que Usted"	Best Collaboration – Pop/Urban	Nominated	
Latin American Music Awards	2024	"La Falta Que Me Haces"	Favorite Tropical Song	Nominated	
Lo Nuestro Awards	2019	Natti Natasha	Female Urban Artist of the Year	Nominated	
Lo Nuestro Awards	2019	"Quién Sabe"	Single of the Year	Nominated	
Lo Nuestro Awards	2019	"Dura (Remix)"	Remix of the Year	Nominated	
Lo Nuestro Awards	2019	"El Baño (Remix)"	Remix of the Year	Nominated	
Lo Nuestro Awards	2019	"Justicia"	Collaboration of the Year	Nominated	
Lo Nuestro Awards	2019	"Sin Pijama"	Urban Song of the Year	Won	
Lo Nuestro Awards	2019	"Dura (Remix)"	Urban Song of the Year	Nominated	
Lo Nuestro Awards	2019	"Sin Pijama"	Urban Collaboration of the Year	Won	
Lo Nuestro Awards	2019	"El Baño (Remix)"	Urban Collaboration of the Year	Nominated	
Lo Nuestro Awards	2019	"Quién Sabe"	Tropical Song of the Year	Won	
Lo Nuestro Awards	2019	"Justicia"	Tropical Song of the Year	Nominated	
Lo Nuestro Awards	2019	"Justicia"	Tropical Collaboration of the Year	Won	
Lo Nuestro Awards	2019	"No Me Acuerdo"	Pop/Rock Collaboration of the Year	Nominated	
Lo Nuestro Awards	2020	Natti Natasha	Female Urban Artist of the Year	Nominated	
Lo Nuestro Awards	2020	Natti Natasha	Social Artist of the Year	Nominated	
Lo Nuestro Awards	2020	"Me Gusta (Remix)"	Remix of the Year	Nominated	
Lo Nuestro Awards	2020	"Runaway"	Crossover Collaboration of the Year	Nominated	
Lo Nuestro Awards	2020	"No Lo Trates"	Urban Song of the Year	Nominated	
Lo Nuestro Awards	2020	"No Lo Trates"	Urban Collaboration of the Year	Nominated	
Lo Nuestro Awards	2021	Natti Natasha	Artist of the Year	Nominated	
Lo Nuestro Awards	2021	Natti Natasha	Female Urban Artist of the Year	Nominated	
Lo Nuestro Awards	2021	"La Mejor Versión de Mí (Remix)"	Song of the Year	Nominated	
Lo Nuestro Awards	2021	"La Mejor Versión de Mí (Remix)"	Remix of the Year	Nominated	
Lo Nuestro Awards	2021	"Honey Boo"	Urban/Pop Song of the Year	Nominated	
Lo Nuestro Awards	2021	"La Mejor Versión de Mí (Remix)"	Tropical Song of the Year	Won	
Lo Nuestro Awards	2022	Natti Natasha	Female Urban Artist of the Year	Nominated	
Lo Nuestro Awards	2022	"Ayer Me Llamó Mi Ex (Remix)"	Urban Song of the Year	Nominated	
Lo Nuestro Awards	2022	"Ayer Me Llamó Mi Ex (Remix)"	Urban Collaboration of the Year	Won	
Lo Nuestro Awards	2022	"Ayer Me Llamó Mi Ex (Remix)"	Remix of the Year	Won	
Lo Nuestro Awards	2022	"Antes Que Salga El Sol"	Urban/Pop Song of the Year	Nominated	
Lo Nuestro Awards	2022	"Antes Que Salga El Sol"	Perfect mix of the Year	Nominated	
Lo Nuestro Awards	2022	Nattividad	Urban Album of the Year	Nominated	
Lo Nuestro Awards	2023	Natti Natasha	Female Urban Artist of the Year	Nominated	
Lo Nuestro Awards	2023	"Wow BB"	Pop Collaboration of the Year	Nominated	
Lo Nuestro Awards	2023	"Mayor Que Usted"	Urban Collaboration of the Year	Nominated	
Lo Nuestro Awards	2024	"La Falta Que Me Haces"	Pop Song of the Year	Nominated	
Lo Nuestro Awards	2024	"To' Esto es Tuyo"	Urban/Pop Song of the Year	Nominated	
Lo Nuestro Awards	2024	Natti Natasha	Female Urban Artist of the Year	Nominated	
Lo Nuestro Awards	2025	"Como La Flor"	Pop-Urban/Dance Song Of The Year	Nominated	
Lo Nuestro Awards	2025	"To The Beat"	Crossover Collaboration of the Year	Nominated	
Lo Nuestro Awards	2025	"Quiéreme Menos"	Tropical Song of the Year	Nominated	
Lo Nuestro Awards	2025	"Ya No Te Extraño"	Pop-Urban Song of the Year	Nominated	
Lo Nuestro Awards	2025	Nasty Singles	Pop-Urban Album of the Year	Nominated	
Lo Nuestro Awards	2025	Natti Natasha	Urban Female Artist of the Year	Nominated	
Lo Nuestro Awards	2026	"Dem Bow"	Best Dembow Song	Won	
Lo Nuestro Awards	2026	"Desde Hoy"	Song of the Year	Nominated	
Lo Nuestro Awards	2026	"Desde Hoy"	Tropical Song of the Year	Nominated	
Lo Nuestro Awards	2026	Natti Natasha En Amargue	Tropical Album of the Year	Won	
Lo Nuestro Awards	2026	Natti Natasha	Urban Female Artist of the Year	Nominated	
MTV Europe Music Awards	2021	Natti Natasha	Best Caribbean Act	Nominated	
MTV Europe Music Awards	2022	Natti Natasha	Best Caribbean Act	Nominated	
MTV Millennial Awards	2018	"Criminal"	Collaboration of the Year	Nominated	
MTV Millennial Awards	2019	Natti Natasha	Viral Artist	Won	
MTV Millennial Awards	2021	Natti Natasha	MIAW Artist	Nominated	
MTV Millennial Awards	2021	"Las Nenas"	Music-Ship of the Year	Nominated	
People's Choice Awards	2019	Natti Natasha	Latin Artist of the Year	Nominated	
People's Choice Awards	2021	Natti Natasha	Latin Artist of the Year	Nominated	
Premios Juventud	2019	Natti Natasha	Can't Get Enough... (Best Social Artist)	Nominated	
Premios Juventud	2019	"Me Gusta"	Best Song: Singing in the Shower	Nominated	
Premios Juventud	2019	"Me Gusta"	Sick Dance Routine (Best Choreography)	Nominated	
Premios Juventud	2020	Natti Natasha	And Featuring...	Nominated	
Premios Juventud	2020	Natti Natasha	Breaking the Internet	Nominated	
Premios Juventud	2020	"Me Estás Matando"	Video With A Purpose	Nominated	
Premios Juventud	2021	Natti Natasha	Female Youth Artist of the Year	Nominated	
Premios Juventud	2021	"Antes Que Salga el Sol"	Tropical Mix (Song with the Best Tropical Collaboration)	Won	
Premios Juventud	2021	"Honey Boo"	La Mezcla Perfecta (Song with the Best Collaboration)	Nominated	
Premios Juventud	2022	Natti Natasha	Female Youth Artist of the Year	Nominated	
Premios Juventud	2022	Nattividad	Album of the Year	Nominated	
Premios Juventud	2022	"Yummy Yummy Love"	Best Girl Power Collab	Nominated	
Premios Juventud	2022	"Wow BB"	The Perfect Mix	Nominated	
Premios Juventud	2022	"Wow BB"	The Hottest Choreography	Nominated	
Premios Juventud	2023	"Lokita"	Girl Power	Nominated	
Premios Juventud	2023	"Lokita"	Social Dance Challenge	Nominated	
Premios Juventud	2023	"Mayor Que Usted"	The Hottest Choreography	Won	
Premios Juventud	2023	"Mayor Que Usted"	Best Pop/Urban Collaboration	Won	
Premios Juventud	2023	"To' Esto es Tuyo"	Best Dembow Song	Won	
Premios Juventud	2025	Natti Natasha	Artist of the Year	Nominated	
Premios Juventud	2025	"Como La Flor"	Best Dance Track	Won	
Premios Juventud	2025	"Desde Hoy"	Best Tropical Hit	Nominated	
Premios Juventud	2025	Natti Natasha En Amargue	Best Tropical Album	Won	
Premios Tu Música Urbano	2019	Natti Natasha	International Female Artist	Won	
Premios Tu Música Urbano	2019	"Sin Pijama"	International Artist Song	Won	
Premios Tu Música Urbano	2019	"Sin Pijama"	International Artist Video	Won	
Premios Tu Música Urbano	2019	"Quién Sabe"	International Artist Video	Nominated	
Premios Tu Música Urbano	2019	"Dura (Remix)"	Remix of the Year	Nominated	
Premios Tu Música Urbano	2019	"Zum Zum (Remix)"	Remix of the Year	Nominated	
Premios Tu Música Urbano	2020	Natti Natasha	Top Female Artist	Won	
Premios Tu Música Urbano	2020	"Me Gusta"	Female Song	Nominated	
Premios Tu Música Urbano	2020	"La Mejor Versión de Mí"	Female Song	Won	
Premios Tu Música Urbano	2020	Iluminatti	Best Female Album	Won	
Premios Tu Música Urbano	2022	Natti Natasha	Top Artist — Female	Nominated	
Premios Tu Música Urbano	2022	"Ram Pam Pam"	Collaboration of the Year	Nominated	
Premios Tu Música Urbano	2022	"Ram Pam Pam"	Video of the Year	Nominated	
Premios Tu Música Urbano	2022	Nattividad	Album of the Year – Female Artist	Nominated	
Premios Tu Música Urbano	2023	Natti Natasha	Top Artist — Female	Nominated	
Premios Tu Música Urbano	2023	"To' Esto Es Tuyo"	Top Song — Dembow	Nominated	
