= Zona del Perreo =

Song by Daddy Yankee featuring Natti Natasha and Becky G

from the album Legendaddy
- Released: March 24, 2022
- Genre: Reggaeton
- Length: 3:12
- Label: El Cartel; Universal; Republic
- Songwriters: Ramón Luis Ayala Rodríguez; Carlos Enrique Rivera; Juan G Rivera; Natalia Alexandra Gutiérrez Batista; Ovimael Maldonado; Rafael Pina; Rebbeca Marie Gomez
- Producers: Daddy Yankee; Chris Jedi; Gaby Music

Music video
- "Zona del Perreo" on YouTube

"Zona del Perreo" is a song by Puerto Rican singer-rapper Daddy Yankee, Dominican singer Natti Natasha and American singer Becky G, from Yankee's seventh and final studio album, Legendaddy.

== Background ==
"Zona del Perreo" is a contemporary reggaeton song featuring singers Natti Natasha and Becky G, the only female artists on Daddy Yankee's album. All three previously co-wrote Gomez and Natasha's 2018 single "Sin Pijama", with production from Yankee, (from the former's 2019 debut studio album) and Yankee received songwriting credits on "Ram Pam Pam" (from their 2021 and 2022 albums) for its interpolation of his 2007 song "Ella Me Levantó". The artists also collaborated on the remix of Yankee's single "Dura", released on April 27, 2018.

== Music video ==
The official music video was one of nine that also premiered simultaneously with the album's release. In the video, a racing motorcycle is shown at the beginning and other cars are racing, while all three artists sing and dance in different scenarios. Dancers appear in the background, with some of them performing choreographed dance moves with the girls.

== Charts ==
Chart (2022)	Peak position
Spain (Promusicae)	73
US Hot Latin Songs (Billboard)	32
