= Amantes de una Noche =

Single by Natti Natasha and Bad Bunny
- Language: Spanish
- English title: "Lovers for One Night"
- Released: 12 January 2018
- Genre: Reggaeton; indie pop; baroque pop
- Length: 3:45
- Label: Pina
- Songwriters: Natalia Gutiérrez; Benito Martínez; Ramón Ayala; Michael Delgado; Alexis Guzmán; Luian Nieves; Jean Carlos Pacheco; Rafael Pina; Juan Rivera; Edgar Semper-Vargas; Xavier Semper-Vargas
- Producers: Daddy Yankee; MikeyTone; Gaby Music

Natti Natasha singles chronology
"Criminal" (2017)	"Amantes de una Noche" (2018)	"Tonta" (2018)

Bad Bunny singles chronology
"Chambea" (2017)	"Amantes de una Noche" (2018)	"El Baño" (2018)

Music video
- "Amantes de una Noche" on YouTube

"Amantes de una Noche" (transl. "Lovers for One Night") is a song by Dominican singer Natti Natasha and Puerto Rican rapper Bad Bunny, released by Pina Records on 12 January 2018.

== Background ==
"Amantes de una Noche" was written by two singers, Alexis Guzmán, DJ Luian, Jean Carlos Pacheco, Mambo Kingz, and its producers Daddy Yankee, MikeyTone and Gaby Music. It is a midtempo reggaeton song.

== Music video ==
The music video for "Amantes de una Noche" was directed by Venezuelan director Nuno Gómes and filmed in Miami. Gómes previously directed Natasha's music video for "Criminal". The singer revealed that she portrayed a character in the video because she personally does not identify with being comfortable with one-night stands. "It is a situation that occurs a lot in the world and I thought ... why not dedicate a topic to that?", she explained. Regarding the filming process, Natasha said, "I didn't take it as if I was recording a video, but as if I was at a real party."

The music video received over 52 million on YouTube in its first week of release, and has since surpassed over 390 million views on the platform. Marjua Estevez of Billboard called it a "sizzling video" and "a lesson from Natti on how to hook-and-catch Mr. Man". However, other reviewers were critical of Natasha's appearance. In Hoy, Tommy Calle wrote that she was used to add visual appeal and "left little to the imagination". Sergio Burstein of The Baltimore Sun accused Natasha of appeasing to men and sexism through "the usual game of the industry" and "absolute lack of prejudice to constantly show herself in intimate clothing from the most daring in order to awaken desire by highlighting her obvious physical benefits."

== Charts ==
=== Weekly charts ===
Chart (2018)	Peak position
Argentina Hot 100 (Billboard)	73
Dominican Republic (Monitor Latino)	3
Honduras (Monitor Latino)	18
Spain (Promusicae)	48
US Hot Latin Songs (Billboard)	25

=== Year-end charts ===
Chart (2018)	Position
Dominican Republic (Monitor Latino)	10
El Salvador (Monitor Latino)	79
Honduras (Monitor Latino)	58
Nicaragua (Monitor Latino)	85
US Hot Latin Songs (Billboard)	88

== Certifications ==
Region	Certification	Certified units/sales
Spain (Promusicae)	Platinum	60,000^{‡}
United States (RIAA)	2× Platinum (Latin)	120,000^{‡}
^{‡} Sales+streaming figures based on certification alone.
