= Premio Lo Nuestro 2019 =

Latin Music awards show

- Date: February 21, 2019
- Location: American Airlines Arena, Miami
- Country: USA
- Hosted by: Alejandra Espinoza; Maite Perroni; Victor Manuelle
- Most awards: Ozuna (9)
- Most nominations: Natti Natasha (14)

Television/radio coverage
- Network: Univision

The 31st Premio Lo Nuestro ceremony was held on February 21, 2019. Univision broadcast the show live from the AmericanAirlines Arena in Miami, Florida. Mexican-American TV presenter, Alejandra Espinoza, Mexican singer and actress Maite Perroni, and American singer Victor Manuelle hosted the ceremony.

The ceremony honors the best in Latin music in categories such as regional Mexican, tropical, and urban. Natti Natasha had the most nominations with 14, followed by J Balvin and Bad Bunny with 12 each. Voting started on January 8 and lasted until January 22, 2019. Ozuna had the most wins of the night with nine, followed by Reik and Wisin with five, and Natti Natasha with four.

The 2019 edition of Premios Lo Nuestro debuted seven new categories: Sierreño Artist of the Year, reflecting the fusion of regional Mexican sounds; Replay Song of the Year, recognizing the popularity of classic hits that fans continue listening to; Single of the Year, the launch of a single song that became a hit; Crossover Collaboration of the Year, hit song in which an Anglo artist is featured; Remix of the Year, popular song in which more than three artists are featured; Social Artist of the Year, renowned artist who shares and engages the most with fans across social media platforms; and Tour of the Year, recognizing sold-out concert tours. Brazilian singer Roberto Carlos was presented with the Excellence Award.

== Performers ==
Artist(s)	Song(s)
Pre-show
Aitana; Ana Guerra; Greeicy	"Lo Malo (Remix)"
Casper Magico; Nio García; Darell	"Te Boté"
CNCO	"Se Vuelve Loca" (Live from José Miguel Agrelot Coliseum)
Nacho	"Déjalo"
Lele Pons; Fuego	"Bloqueo"
Main show
Marc Anthony	"Tu Vida en la Mía"
Thalía; Lali; Natti Natasha	"Lindo Pero Bruto" "No me acuerdo"
Juanes	"La Plata"
Alejandro Sanz	"Back in the City"
Maná	"Rayando El Sol" "Mariposa Traicionera" "Oye Mi Amor"
Ozuna	"Cama Vacía" "Baila Baila Baila" "Taki Taki"
Joss Favela; Reik; Roberto Carlos; Alejandro Sanz	Tribute to Roberto Carlos "Amigo" "El gato que está triste y azul" "Esa Mujer" "Yo Sólo Quiero"
Daddy Yankee	"Con Calma"
J Balvin	"Reggaetón"
Intocable	"Quédate Conmigo" "Me Dueles"
Natti Natasha; Silvestre Dangond	"Pa' Mala Yo" "Justicia"
Christian Nodal	"Nada Nuevo" "No Te Contaron Mal"
Pedro Capó; Farruko	"Calma (Remix)"
Daddy Yankee; De La Ghetto; Zion & Lennox; Yandel; Ozuna; J Balvin	Tribute to Daddy Yankee "Rompe" "Ella Me Levantó" "¿Qué Tengo Que Hacer?" "Lo Que Pasó, Pasó" "Gasolina"
Piso 21	"Te Vi"
Sergio George; Pepe Aguilar; Farruko; Anitta; Prince Royce	Salsa Vive: "Prometiste" "Nadie" "Veneno" "Adicto" "Stand by Me"
Anuel AA	"Hipócrita" "Quiere Beber"
Reik; Ozuna	"Me niego"

== Presenters ==
- Galilea Montijo and Diego Torres – presented Song of the Year
- Patricia Velásquez – introduced Juanes
- Amara La Negra and Gabriel Soto – presented Tropical Song of the Year
- Alex Fernandez and Lupita Infante – introduced Joss Favela, Reik, Roberto Carlos and Alejandro Sanz
- De La Ghetto, Reykon and Victoria La Mala – presented Regional Mexican Artist of the Year
- Omar Chaparro – introduced Daddy Yankee
- Anitta and Algenis Perez Soto – presented Male Urban Artist of the Year
- Primer Impacto cast – introduced Intocable
- Pepe Aguilar – presented Lifetime Achievement Award
- Abraham Mateo, Kimberly Dos Ramos and Nacho – introduced Christian Nodal
- El Bebeto, Inna and Pedro Moreno – presented Revelation Artist of the Year
- Oscar De La Rosa and Sandra Echeverría – presented Sierreño Artist of the Year
- El Bueno, la Mala y el Feo cast – introduced Piso 21
- Casper Smart, Manu Manzo and Ulices Chaidez – presented Tropical Collaboration of the Year
- El Dasa and Lele Pons – introduced Anuel AA

== Winners and nominees ==
The official nominees were revealed on January 8, 2019. Natti Natasha had the most nominations with 14, followed by J Balvin and Bad Bunny with 12 each, Ozuna with 10, Nicky Jam with eight, and Maluma, Becky G, and Wisin all with 7. Brazilian singer Anitta nabbed four nominations, including revelation of the year. Ozuna had the most wins of the night with nine, followed by Reik and Wisin with five, Natti Natasha with four, and J Balvin with three. Daddy Yankee and Intocable were honored with the Lifetime Achievement Award, while Roberto Carlos received the Excellence Award.

=== General ===
Artist of the Year

- J Balvin
  - Carlos Vives
  - Christian Nodal
  - Maluma

Song of the Year

- Reik (featuring Ozuna and Wisin) – "Me niego"
  - Carlos Vives – "Hoy Tengo Tiempo (Pinta Sensual)"
  - Calibre 50 – "Mitad y Mitad"
  - Nicky Jam and J Balvin – "X"

Video of the Year

- Karol G and J Balvin (featuring Nicky Jam) – "Mi Cama (Remix)"
  - Sofía Reyes (featuring Jason Derulo and De La Ghetto) – "1, 2, 3"
  - Lele Pons – "Celoso"
  - Maluma – "El Préstamo"
  - Piso 21 – "La Vida sin Ti"
  - Rosalía – "Malamente"
  - El Bebeto – "Seremos"
  - Residente and Dillon Francis (featuring iLe) – "Sexo"
  - Pablo Alborán – "Tu Refugio"
  - Sebastián Yatra and Mau y Ricky – "Ya No Tiene Novio"

Single of the Year

- Reik (featuring Ozuna and Wisin) – "Me niego"
  - Natti Natasha – "Quién Sabe"
  - Calibre 50 – "Mitad y Mitad"
  - Nicky Jam and J Balvin – "X"

Remix of the Year

- Nio Garcia, Casper Magico and Bad Bunny (featuring Ozuna, Nicky Jam and Darell) – "Te Boté (Remix)"
  - Daddy Yankee (featuring Becky G, Bad Bunny and Natti Natasha) – "Dura (Remix)"
  - Enrique Iglesias (featuring Bad Bunny and Natti Natasha) – "El Baño (Remix)"
  - Farruko, Daddy Yankee and Akon (featuring Sean Paul) – "Inolvidable (Remix)"
  - Mau y Ricky and Karol G (featuring Becky G, Leslie Grace and Lali) – "Mi Mala (Remix)"

Collaboration of the Year

- Reik (featuring Ozuna and Wisin) – "Me niego"
  - Julión Álvarez and Hansen Flores – "Fino pero Sordo"
  - Silvestre Dangond and Natti Natasha – "Justicia"
  - Nicky Jam and J Balvin – "X"

Crossover Collaboration of the Year

- DJ Snake (featuring Cardi B, Ozuna and Selena Gomez – "Taki Taki"
  - Luis Fonsi and Stefflon Don – "Calypso"
  - Marc Anthony, Bad Bunny and Will Smith – "Esta Rico"
  - Cardi B, Bad Bunny and J Balvin – "I Like It"
  - Bad Bunny (featuring Drake) – "Mia"

Tour of the Year

- Ozuna – Aura Tour
  - Shakira – El Dorado World Tour
  - Maluma – F.A.M.E. Tour
  - Romeo Santos – Golden Tour
  - Bad Bunny – La Nueva Religión Tour
  - Marc Anthony – Legacy Tour
  - Luis Miguel – México Por Siempre Tour
  - Alejandro Fernández and Los Tigres del Norte – Rompiendo Fronteras Tour
  - Gloria Trevi and Alejandra Guzmán – Versus World Tour
  - J Balvin – Vibras Tour

Replay Song of the Year

- Enrique Iglesias – "Por Amarte"
  - Laura Pausini – "Amores Extraños"
  - Maná – "Cachito"
  - Paulina Rubio – "El Último Adiós"
  - Alejandra Guzmán – "Volverte a Amar"

Social Artist of the Year

- J Balvin
  - Anitta
  - CNCO
  - Jennifer Lopez
  - Maluma

Revelation Artist of the Year

- Anuel AA
  - Anitta
  - Casper Magico
  - Hansen Flores
  - Manuel Turizo
  - Nio Garcia
  - Raymix
  - TINI
  - T3r Elemento
  - Virlan Garcia

=== Regional Mexican ===
Regional Mexican Artist of the Year

- Christian Nodal
  - Gerardo Ortiz
  - Joss Favela
  - Luis Coronel
  - Raymix

Regional Mexican Song of the Year

- Banda MS – "Tu Postura"
  - Calibre 50 – "Mitad y Mitad"
  - Raymix – "Oye Mujer"
  - Banda Rancho Viejo – "Privilegio"
  - Ulices Chaidez – "Que Bonito Es Querer"

Regional Mexican Group or Duo of the Year

- Calibre 50
  - Banda Carnaval
  - Banda Rancho Viejo
  - Banda MS
  - Ulices Chaidez y sus Plebes

Banda Song of the Year

- Banda MS – "Tu Postura"
  - La Arrolladora Banda el Limon de Rene Camacho – "Calidad y Cantidad"
  - La Adictiva Banda San Jose de Mesillas – "En Peligro de Extinción"
  - Banda Rancho Viejo – "Privilegio"
  - Banda Carnaval – "Segunda Opción"

Sierreño Artist of the Year

- T3R Elemento
  - Crecer German
  - Lenin Ramirez
  - Ulices Chaidez y Sus Plebes
  - Virlan Garcia

Norteño Song of the Year

- Calibre 50 – "Mitad y Mitad"
  - Voz de Mando – "El que a ti te gusta"
  - Intocable – "Cuidaré"
  - Gerardo Ortiz – "El aroma de tu piel"
  - Julión Álvarez and Hansen Flores – "Fino pero Sordo"

=== Urban ===
Male Urban Artist of the Year

- Ozuna
- Bad Bunny
- Daddy Yankee
- J Balvin
- Nicky Jam

Female Urban Artist of the Year

- Karol G
  - Anitta
  - Becky G
  - Cardi B
  - Natti Natasha

Urban Song of the Year

- Becky G and Natti Natasha – "Sin Pijama"
  - Daddy Yankee (featuring Becky G, Bad Bunny and Natti Natasha) – "Dura (Remix)"
  - Enrique Iglesias (featuring Bad Bunny and Natti Natasha) – "El Baño (Remix)"
  - Ozuna – "Unica"
  - Nicky Jam and J Balvin – "X"

Urban Collaboration of the Year

- Becky G and Natti Natasha – "Sin Pijama"
  - Enrique Iglesias (featuring Bad Bunny and Natti Natasha) – "El Baño (Remix)"
  - J Balvin, Anitta and Jeon – "Machika"
  - Ozuna – "Unica"
  - Nicky Jam and J Balvin – "X"

=== Tropical ===
Tropical Artist of the Year

- Carlos Vives
  - Jerry Rivera
  - Juan Luis Guerra
  - Silvestre Dangond
  - Victor Manuelle

Tropical Song of the Year

- Natti Natasha– "Quién Sabe"
  - Carlos Vives – "Hoy Tengo Tiempo (Pinta Sensual)"
  - Silvestre Dangond and Natti Natasha – "Justicia"
  - Jerry Rivera and Yandel – "Mira"
  - Victor Manuelle (featuring Juan Luis Guerra) – "Quiero Tiempo"

Tropical Collaboration of the Year

- Silvestre Dangond and Natti Natasha – "Justicia"
  - Jerry Rivera and Yandel – "Mira"
  - Victor Manuelle (featuring Juan Luis Guerra) – "Quiero Tiempo"
  - Diego Torres and Carlos Vives – "Un Poquito"

=== Pop/Rock ===
Pop/Rock Group or Duo of the Year

- CNCO
  - Mau y Ricky
  - Piso 21
  - Reik

Pop/Rock Artist of the Year

- Maluma
  - Juanes
  - Ricky Martin
  - Shakira
  - Thalía

Pop/Rock Song of the Year

- Reik (featuring Ozuna and Wisin) – "Me niego"
  - Maluma – "El Préstamo"
  - Ricky Martin (featuring Wisin and Yandel) – "Fiebre"
  - Piso 21 – "La Vida sin Ti"
  - Nacho – "No Te Vas"

Pop/Rock Collaboration of the Year

- Reik (featuring Ozuna and Wisin) – "Me niego"
  - Shakira and Maluma – "Clandestino"
  - Ricky Martin (featuring Wisin and Yandel) – "Fiebre"
  - Thalía and Natti Natasha – "No me acuerdo"
  - Descemer Bueno and Enrique Iglesias (featuring El Micha) – "Nos Fuimos Lejos"

== Special Merit Awards ==
=== Lifetime Achievement Award ===
- Daddy Yankee
- Intocable

=== Excellence Award ===
- Roberto Carlos

== Multiple nominations and awards ==
The following received multiple nominations:

Fourteen:

- Natti Natasha

Twelve:

- Bad Bunny
- J Balvin

Eleven:

- Ozuna

Eight:

- Nicky Jam

Seven:

- Maluma
- Wisin

Six:

- Becky G
- Reik

Five:

- Calibre 50
- Daddy Yankee
- Enrique Iglesias
- Yandel

Four:

- Anitta
- Carlos Vives
- Silvestre Dangond

Three:

- Banda MS
- Banda Rancho Viejo
- Cardi B
- Hansen Flores
- Jerry Rivera
- Karol G
- Mau y Ricky
- Piso 21
- Raymix
- Ricky Martin
- Shakira
- Victor Manuelle

Two:

- Alejandra Guzmán
- Banda Carnaval
- Cásper Mágico
- Christian Nodal
- CNCO
- Gerardo Ortiz
- Juan Luis Guerra
- Julión Álvarez
- Marc Anthony
- Nio García
- T3R Elemento
- Thalía
- Ulices Chaidez y Sus Plebes
- Virlan García

The following received multiple awards:

Nine:

- Ozuna

Five:

- Reik
- Wisin

Four:

- Natti Natasha

Three:

- J Balvin

Two:

- Becky G
- Calibre 50
- Karol G
- Nicky Jam
