= Everybody Loves Natti =

American television documentary series

- Genre: Docuseries
- Starring: Natti Natasha; Raphy Pina
- Country of origin: United States
- Original language: English
- No. of seasons: 1
- No. of episodes: 6

Production
- Executive producers: Alexandra Davies; Stephanie Gayle; Michael Lang; Gil Lopez; Natti Natasha; Raphy Pina; Mona Scott-Young
- Production location: Miami, FL
- Editor: Blanka Kovacs
- Production companies: Amazon Studios; Monami Productions

Original release
- Network: Amazon Prime Video
- Release: November 19, 2021

Everybody Loves Natti is an American television documentary series about Dominican singer Natti Natasha. It premiered on Amazon Prime Video on November 19, 2021.

== Summary ==
The six-episode docuseries explores Natasha's relationship with her manager/fiancé Raphy Pina, recording her 2021 album Nattividad while she was pregnant, and personal obstacles she has faced, including fertility issues and her struggles as an undocumented Dominican immigrant in New York.

The series was created by Mona Scott-Young, and the showrunner is Alex Davies.

== Cast ==
- Natti Natasha
- Raphy Pina
- Vida Isabelle Pina Gutiérrez
- Becky G
- Ariadna Gutiérrez
- Daddy Yankee
- Yovanna Ventura
- Prince Royce

== Episodes ==
| No. | Title | Original release date |
|---|---|---|
| 1 | "The Real Natti Natasha" | 19 November 2021 |
Natti prepares for the release of her new album, after moving from the Dominican Republic to Miami.
| 2 | "Surprise, Surprise!" | 19 November 2021 |
Natti finishes the vocals and films the video for her single "Las Nenas". After flying his kids in from Puerto Rico, and her family in from Tampa, Raphy throws Natti a surprise birthday party.
| 3 | "No More Secrets" | 19 November 2021 |
Natti and Raphy publicize their relationship and recent engagement, while figuring out how to share the news of her pregnancy.
| 4 | "Prince or Princess?" | 19 November 2021 |
Natti and Raphy host their families for a baby shower at their new house in Miami. As they find out that they are expecting a girl, they begin to decorate the nursery and discuss having the baby in the Dominican Republic.
| 5 | "Dominican Dreams" | 19 November 2021 |
Natti's doctor, sister and mom urge her to rest and stay in Miami for the birth of her daughter, while Raphy meets with his lawyers to try to get permission to travel to the Dominican Republic.
| 6 | "All in the Family" | 19 November 2021 |
Natti prepares for her performance on The Tonight Show Starring Jimmy Fallon alongside Becky G. After baby Vida is born, Natti tells Raphy that she's ready to get back to work.

== Release ==
The trailer was released on October 20, 2021. The series premiered on Prime Video on November 19, 2021.
