= La Mejor Versión de Mí =

2019 single by Natti Natasha

Single by Natti Natasha

from the album Iluminatti
- Language: Spanish
- English title: "The Best Version of Me"
- Released: 11 February 2019
- Genre: Latin pop; Latin ballad
- Length: 2:14
- Label: Pina Records; Sony Music Latin
- Songwriters: Natalia Gutiérrez; Rafael Pina; Juan Rivera; Israel Rodríguez
- Producer: Joss Favela

Natti Natasha singles chronology
"Pa Mala Yo" (2019)	"La Mejor Versión de Mí" (2019)	"Te Lo Dije" (2019)

"La Mejor Versión de Mí (Remix)"

Single by Natti Natasha and Romeo Santos
- Released: 3 October 2019
- Genre: Bachata
- Length: 3:50
- Label: Pina Records; Sony Music Latin
- Songwriters: Natalia Gutiérrez; Rafael Pina; Juan Rivera; Israel Rodríguez
- Producer: Romeo Santos

Romeo Santos singles chronology
"Los Últimos" (2019)	"La Mejor Versión de Mí (Remix)" (2019)	"Sigues Con Él" (remix) (2020)

"La Mejor Versión de Mí" (The Best Version of Myself) is a song by Dominican singer Natti Natasha. It was released on February 11, 2019, as the fourth single from her debut studio album, Iluminatti. On October 3, 2019, a bachata remix version featuring Dominican-American singer Romeo Santos was released. The song was listed as one of Billboard's seven Latin songs taking a stance against domestic violence.

== Music videos ==
A music video for the original song was released in February 2019. It shows Natti emotionally singing in front of a black background setting. The music video was compared to Gwen Stefani's "Used to Love You" video. The video has over 125 million views as of April 2020.

The music video for the remix version featuring Romeo Santos was released on October 3, 2019. Directed by Fernando Lugo, the videoclip shows Natti and Romeo in somber settings, such as Santos being trapped in a car that is sinking underwater and Natti in front of a burning car. The music video has over 300 million views on YouTube as of April 2020.

== Charts ==
=== Weekly charts ===
Chart performance for the Remix
Chart (2019)	Peak position
Dominican Republic Bachata (Monitor Latino)	1
Dominican Republic General (Monitor Latino)	3
Puerto Rico (Monitor Latino)	1
US Bubbling Under Hot 100 (Billboard)	19
US Hot Latin Songs (Billboard)	10
US Latin Airplay (Billboard)	5
US Tropical Airplay (Billboard)	1

=== Year-end charts ===
Chart (2019)	Position
US Hot Latin Songs (Billboard)	97
US Hot Tropical Songs (Billboard)	19

Chart (2020)	Position
US Hot Latin Songs (Billboard)	41

== Certifications ==
Region	Certification	Certified units/sales
Spain (Promusicae) Remix	Platinum	60,000^{‡}
United States (RIAA)	3× Platinum (Latin)	180,000^{‡}
United States (RIAA) Remix	6× Platinum (Latin)	360,000^{‡}
^{‡} Sales+streaming figures based on certification alone.
