= Ram Pam Pam =

2021 single by Natti Natasha and Becky G

Single by Natti Natasha and Becky G

from the album Nattividad and Esquemas
- Language: Spanish
- Released: April 20, 2021
- Genre: Reggaeton
- Length: 3:21
- Label: Pina; Sony Latin
- Songwriters: Natalia Gutiérrez; Francisco Saldaña; Jean Carlos Hernández Espinal; Rebbeca Gomez; Rafael Pina; Ovimael Maldonado Burgos; Nino Karlo Segarra; Ramón Ayala; Justin Quiles; Siggy Vázquez; Elena Rose; Juan Manuel Frias; Valentina López
- Producers: Jean Carlos Hernández Espinal; Rafael Pina

Natti Natasha singles chronology
"Las Nenas" (2021)	"Ram Pam Pam" (2021)	"Philliecito" (2021)

Becky G singles chronology
"Down to Miami" (2021)	"Ram Pam Pam" (2021)	"Fulanito" (2021)

Music video
- "Ram Pam Pam" on YouTube

"Ram Pam Pam" is a song by Dominican singer Natti Natasha and American singer Becky G. The song and its music video were released by Pina Records and Sony Music Latin on April 20, 2021. It was written by the two singers, Francisco Saldaña, Ovimael Maldonado Burgos, Nino Karlo Segarra, Justin Quiles, Siggy Vázquez, Elena Rose, Juan Manuel Frias, Valentina López and its producers Jean Carlos Hernández Espinal and label head Rafael Pina. It interpolates "Ella Me Levantó" (2007), written and performed by Daddy Yankee. It is Natasha and Gomez's third collaboration, following the hugely successful "Sin Pijama" and the remix of "Dura" (with Yankee and Bad Bunny), both released in April 2018.

== Background and release ==
On April 20, 2018, Gomez released "Sin Pijama" with Natasha, a collaboration that would go on to become a huge hit, being certified platinum by the RIAA's Latin field and garnering over 100 million views within three weeks. As of 2024, the official music video on YouTube for "Sin Pijama" has earned over 2.1 billion views. Gomez and Natasha, although nearly ten years apart in age, became close friends while filming the music video and recording the track. Subsequently, they were featured on the remix of "Dura" by Daddy Yankee.

Natasha released her single "Las Nenas", a collaboration with Cazzu, Farina, and La Duraca, in March 2021; the end of the song's music video featured a cameo from Gomez arriving in a car, picking up Natasha and then driving off, leading to speculation that the next single would feature her. Both artists teased the song about a week before its release, uploading it onto each of their respective social media networks with a video containing the phrases "the story continues" and "the perfect combo". Later, the two revealed the cover art and eventual release date, which was to be on the third anniversary of "Sin Pijama".

== Music and lyrics ==
"Ram Pam Pam" is a reggaetón song lasting three minutes and twenty-one seconds. Its vocal arrangement is similar to that of "Sin Pijama", with Gomez singing the first verse and Natasha leading into the pre-chorus with Gomez. The first chorus is sung solely by Natasha, with Gomez taking the latter half on the rest. Natasha sings the post-chorus after the second chorus, and Gomez sings the second one before the outro.

Lyrically, the song is about women moving on from a no-good man, telling him that they're over the trouble and have found someone better. Gomez's verse is about her ex having "lots of chains" and jewelry that, at the end, didn't serve any purpose, and that he didn't see he "had a queen in front of [him]" all along. Natasha discusses kicking her ex out, not wanting him anymore after the drama, and having "another that fits better". Her verse includes an interpolation of the line "Llora, nena, llora, llora" (Cry, baby, cry, cry) from "Ella Me Levantó" by Yankee, but with reversed genders, telling the man to cry for her instead. The chorus features the singers saying that they found new partners with whom they go "ram pam pam pam pam" (the song’s title, and a euphemism for sex). They also tell their exes to not look for them, and that their new partners take them to the club to dance, or "perrear".

== Music video ==
=== Background ===
The music video for "Ram Pam Pam" was directed by Venezuelan director Daniel Duran, Gomez's constant collaborator, and was filmed using a green screen. It was released alongside the song on April 20. Similar to "Sin Pijama", the video includes a cameo appearance by American singer Prince Royce. As of 2024, the video has over 784 million views on YouTube.

=== Synopsis ===
The video shows Natasha and Gomez arriving at a basketball court, where they go into the locker room to change. The girls sing in the locker room, the bleachers, and on the court, being accompanied by female backup dancers in the latter. They peek through a door to see Prince Royce and his team playing. Despite no game being shown, the girls appear holding a trophy at the end, celebrating with champagne. In its closing scene, Natasha throws the basketball at Royce, possibly referencing their previous collaboration, "Antes Que Salga El Sol".

== Live performances ==
Natasha and Gomez performed "Ram Pam Pam" together for the first time at The Tonight Show Starring Jimmy Fallon on May 17, 2021.

== Remix ==
On September 7, 2021, a German-Spanish version of the song with German singer Vanessa Mai was released.

== Critical reception ==
Publication	List	Rank	Ref.
Billboard	The 25 Best Latin Songs	—N/a	

== Accolades ==
Awards and nominations for "Ram Pam Pam"
Organization	Year	Category	Result	Ref.
ASCAP Latin Awards	2022	Winning Songs (Note: Awards and nominations Natasha and Gomez has received as songwriter.)	Won	
BreakTudo Awards	2021	Latin Hit	Nominated	
Premios Juventud	2021	Girl Power	Won	
Premios Tu Música Urbano	2022	Video of the Year	Nominated	

== Charts ==
=== Weekly charts ===
Weekly chart performance for "Ram Pam Pam"
Chart (2021)	Peak position
Argentina Hot 100 (Billboard)	6
Bolivia (Monitor Latino)	14
Colombia (National-Report)	11
Ecuador (Monitor Latino)	18
Ecuador (National-Report)	10
El Salvador (Monitor Latino)	1
Global 200 (Billboard)	52
Global Excl. US (Billboard)	33
Guatemala (Monitor Latino)	5
Honduras (Monitor Latino)	13
Hungary (Single Top 40)	34
Italy (FIMI)	69
Mexico (Billboard Mexican Airplay)	5
Mexico (Mexico Español Airplay)	3
Nicaragua (Monitor Latino)	16
Panama (Monitor Latino)	14
Peru (Monitor Latino)	6
Puerto Rico (Monitor Latino)	7
Romania (Airplay 100)	9
Spain (PROMUSICAE)	16
Uruguay (Monitor Latino)	11
US Bubbling Under Hot 100 (Billboard)	20
US Hot Latin Songs (Billboard)	12
US Latin Airplay (Billboard)	1
US Latin Rhythm Airplay (Billboard)	1
Venezuela (Record Report)	28

=== Year-end charts ===
Year-end chart performance for "Ram Pam Pam"
Chart (2021)	Position
Argentina (Monitor Latino)	70
Chile (Monitor Latino)	69
Costa Rica (Monitor Latino)	79
Ecuador (Monitor Latino)	50
El Salvador (Monitor Latino)	20
Guatemala (Monitor Latino)	13
Honduras (Monitor Latino)	35
Latin America (Monitor Latino)	38
Nicaragua Urbano (Monitor Latino)	28
Panama (Monitor Latino)	78
Paraguay (Monitor Latino)	77
Peru (Monitor Latino)	29
Puerto Rico (Monitor Latino)	26
Spain (PROMUSICAE)	64
Uruguay (Monitor Latino)	44
US Hot Latin Songs (Billboard)	29
US Latin Airplay (Billboard)	45
US Latin Rhythm Airplay (Billboard)	30
Venezuela (Monitor Latino)	27
Chart (2022)	Position
Guatemala (Monitor Latino)	99
Honduras (Monitor Latino)	93

== Certifications ==
Region	Certification	Certified units/sales
Italy (FIMI)	Gold	35,000^{‡}
Mexico (AMPROFON)	Platinum+Gold	210,000^{‡}
Spain (Promusicae)	2× Platinum	80,000^{‡}
United States (RIAA)	4× Platinum (Latin)	240,000^{‡}
Streaming
Central America (CFC)	Platinum	7,000,000^{†}
^{‡} Sales+streaming figures based on certification alone.^{†} Streaming-only figures based on certification alone.

== Release history ==
Release dates and formats for "Mala Santa"
Region	Date	Format	Label	Ref.
Various	April 20, 2021	Digital download; streaming	Pina; Sony Latin	
Italy	May 7, 2021	Radio airplay	Sony Latin	

== See also ==
- List of Billboard number-one Latin songs of 2021
