= Sentimiento, Elegancia & Maldad =

Studio album by Arcángel
- Released: November 19, 2013
- Recorded: 2010–2013
- Genres: Reggaeton; rap; Latin pop
- Length: 63:53
- Labels: Pina; Sony Latin
- Producers: DJ Luian (exec.); Tainy; Nely el Arma Secreta; Mambo Kingz; Noize "El Nuevo Sonido"; DJ Giann; Gaby "De Los Metalicoz"; Nico Canada; Mad Music; Los Evo Jedis; Magnífico

Arcángel chronology
El Fenómeno (2008)	Sentimiento, Elegancia & Maldad (2013)	Los Favoritos (2015)

Singles from Sentimiento, Elegancia & Maldad
- 1. "Hace Mucho Tiempo" Released: June 21, 2013

Sentimiento, Elegancia & Maldad (transl. Feeling, Elegancy & Evilness) is the second studio album by American singer-songwriter Arcángel. It was released on November 19, 2013, through Pina Records and Sony Music Latin, and contains collaborations with Daddy Yankee, De la Ghetto, Ñengo Flow, and duo Genio & Baby Johnny. The lead single from the album, "Hace Mucho Tiempo", was released on June 21, 2013.

== Track listing ==
1. "Dios Te Bendiga"
2. "Hace Mucho Tiempo"
3. "Contigo Quiero Amores"
4. "Sola" (featuring De la Ghetto)
5. "Iré a Buscarte"
6. "Gucci Boys Club"
7. "Cuando Tú No Estás"
8. "Como Tiene Que Ser"
9. "Pakas de 100" (featuring Daddy Yankee)
10. "SEM"
11. "Diferente"
12. "Ayer Escuché Una Voz" (featuring Ñengo Flow)
13. "Me, Myself & My Money"
14. "Que Le Den"
15. "Le Llego Donde Sea" (featuring Genio & Baby Johnny)
16. "Lentamente"
17. "Tiene Un Piquete"
18. "Por la Plata Baila el Mono"

All solo tracks wrote by Austin Santos, except the track "Lentamente" (wrote by Gabriel Cruz).

== Charts ==
=== Weekly charts ===
Weekly chart performance for Sentimiento, Elegancia & Maldad
Chart (2013)	Peak position
US Billboard 200	98
US Top Rap Albums (Billboard)	9
US Top Latin Albums (Billboard)	1
US Latin Rhythm Albums (Billboard)	1
Venezuelan Albums (Recordland)	18

=== Year-end charts ===
Year-end performance for Sentimiento, Elegancia & Maldad
Chart (2014)	Position
US Top Latin Albums (Billboard)	32

== Certifications ==
Region	Certification	Certified units/sales
United States (RIAA)	Gold (Latin)	30,000^{‡}
^{‡} Sales+streaming figures based on certification alone.

== See also ==
- List of number-one Billboard Latin Albums from the 2010s
