= Quién Sabe =

Single by Natti Natasha
- Language: Spanish
- English title: "Who knows?"
- Released: 22 June 2018
- Genre: Bachata
- Length: 4:29
- Label: Pina; Sony Latin
- Songwriters: Natalia Gutiérrez; Wise "The Gold Pen"; Lenny Santos; Yoel Damas; Rafael Pina
- Producers: Wise "The Gold Pen"; Lenny

Natti Natasha singles chronology
"No Me Acuerdo" (2018)	"Quién Sabe" (2018)	"Justicia" (2018)

Music video
- "Quién Sabe" on YouTube

"Quién Sabe" is a song by Dominican singer Natti Natasha for her debut album, Iluminatti, which was released on 15 February 2019, through Pina Records and Sony Music Latin. According to Billboard, "Quien Sabe" became the first bachata song ever to enter the ¡Viva Latino! list. The song is her first solo single, after having previously released numerous collaborative singles with other artists.

== Background and composition ==
"Quién Sabe" was written by Natalia Gutiérrez, Wise "The Gold Pen", Lenny Santos, Yoel Damas and Rafael Pina. "Quién Sabe" is a bachata song. The song is written in the key of A Minor and has a moderately fast tempo of 128 beats per minute.

Natti Natasha shared the announcement of this video and single on social networks, and said:

People for a long time asked me for a single song and I felt that this was the moment to do it, the opportunity presented itself and there is no better way to do it than with the music that I grew up with, the music that represents my flag and that musical genre. that fills us with feelings like bachata is

— Natasha

== Music video ==
The music video for "Quién Sabe" was directed by Daniel Duran.

The music video received over 5 million on YouTube in its first day of release, and has since surpassed over 500 million views on the platform.

== Awards and nominations ==
At the 31st Premio Lo Nuestro ceremony, "Quién Sabe" garnered two nominations: "Single of the Year" and "Song of the Year – Tropical".

Awards and nominations for "Quién Sabe"
Year	Award	Category	Result	Ref.
2019	Telemundo's Tu Musica Urban Awards	International Artist Video	Nominated	
2019	Premios Lo Nuestro	Single of the Year	Nominated	
2019	Premios Lo Nuestro	Song of the Year – Tropical	Won	

== Charts ==
=== Weekly charts ===
Chart (2018)	Peak position
Argentina Hot 100 (Billboard)	66
Dominican Republic (Monitor Latino)	4
US Hot Latin Songs (Billboard)	36
US Latin Airplay (Billboard)	23
US Tropical Airplay (Billboard)	2

=== Year-end charts ===
Chart (2018)	Position
Dominican Republic (Monitor Latino)	37
