= Iluminatti =

Studio album by Natti Natasha
- Released: 15 February 2019
- Studio: La Formula De Pina Studios
- Genre: Reggaeton; Latin pop; bachata
- Length: 54:24
- Language: Spanish
- Label: Pina; Sony Latin
- Producer: Gaby Music; Fortuna La Super F; Chris Jedi; Mambo Kingz; DJ Luian; WallyTMW; MikeyTone; Magnifico; Joss Favela; Marcos Sánchez; Maffio; Lenny Santos

Natti Natasha chronology
All About Me (2012)	Iluminatti (2019)	Nattividad (2021)

Singles from Iluminatti
- 1. "Quién Sabe" Released: 22 June 2018; 2. "Me Gusta" Released: 2 December 2018; 3. "Lamento Tu Perdida" Released: 21 December 2018; 4. "Pa' Mala Yo" Released: 10 January 2019; 5. "La Mejor Version de Mi" Released: 11 February 2019; 6. "Te Lo Dije" Released: 20 February 2019; 7. "Obsesión" Released: 22 March 2019; 8. "Oh Daddy" Released: 26 April 2019; 9. "No Voy a Llorar" Released: 31 May 2019; 10. "Deja Tus Besos" Released: 23 July 2019

Iluminatti (stylized in tall man lettering: IlumiNATTI) is the debut studio album by Dominican singer Natti Natasha, released by Pina Records and Sony Music Latin on 15 February 2019. The album has spawned four singles: "Quién Sabe", "Me Gusta", "Pa' Mala Yo" and "Oh Daddy". Iluminatti debuted at number three on the US Top Latin Albums chart with 7,000 album-equivalent units, making it the biggest opening week for a Latin album by a woman since Shakira's El Dorado.

After the album's release, "Te Lo Dije", "Obsesión", "Oh Daddy" and "No Voy a Llorar" were released as following-up singles with music videos.

In June, Natti released a music video for her tenth single, "Deja Tus Besos".

== Background ==
Natasha announced that her album would be titled ilumiNATTI and was set for release on 15 February 2019. In an interview with Billboard, Natasha described the album as an album to empower women, bring love and light to the world. In the interview, Natasha explained the origin of the album's name, ilumiNATTI, and felt that it was right as "ilumi" means light, and added Natti as it is her stage name.

Prior to the album's release, Natasha teased on her personal Instagram account new songs, such as "Era Necesario", "Deja Tus Besos", and "Obsession".

On 2 February 2019, Natasha joined Puerto Rican singer Kany García at the Soy Yo Tour to perform "Soy Mia" at the José Miguel Agrelot Coliseum.

== Singles ==
The album's first official single, "Quién Sabe", was released on 21 June 2018. The second and third singles, "Me Gusta" and "Lamento Tu Perdida" were released in December 2018. The fourth single, "Pa' Mala Yo", was released on 11 January 2019. "La Mejor Version de Mi" was released as fifth single and "Te Lo Dije" as sixth single in February 2019. On 22 March was released the single "Obsesión" and in April was released "Oh Daddy". On May 31, 2019, Natasha released the music video for her ninth single "No Voy a Llorar". In June 2019, Natti announced on her official Instagram account that "Deja Tus Besos" would be remixed and released as the final single off ilumiNATTI alongside Puerto Rican singer Chencho Corleone.

== Track listing ==
Iluminatti track listing
No.	Title	Writer(s)	Producer(s)	Length
1.	"Era Necesario"	Natalia Gutiérrez; José Nieves; Rafael Pina; Juan Rivera; Israel Rodríguez; Waldemar Cancel	WallyTMW; Gaby Music; Fortuna La Super F	3:07
2.	"Deja Tus Besos"	Gutiérrez; Michael Delgado; Pina; Rivera; Waldemar Cancel	WallyTMW; MikeyTone; Gaby Music	3:08
3.	"Obsesión"	Gutiérrez; Delgado; Pina; Rivera; Waldemar Cancel	WallyTMW; MikeyTone; Gaby Music	3:13
4.	"Pa' Mala Yo"	Gutiérrez; Kedin Maizonet; Luian Malave; Pina; Edgar Semper-Vargas; Xavier Semper-Vargas	Mambo Kingz; DJ Luian	2:41
5.	"Oh Daddy"	Gutiérrez; Pina; Rivera; Rodríguez	Gaby Music; Fortuna La Super F	2:58
6.	"Soy Mía" (with Kany García)	Encarnita García	Marcos Sánchez	3:41
7.	"Me Gusta"	Gutiérrez; Pina; Hector Lamboy; Rivera; Simón Restrepo; Ramón Ayala; Justin Quiles; Waldemar Cancel	WallyTMW; Magnifico; Gaby Music	3:17
8.	"No Voy a Llorar"	Gutiérrez; Pina; Carlos Peralta; José Torres	Maffio	3:50
9.	"Toca Toca"	Gutiérrez; Pina; Rivera; Carlos Ortiz	Gaby Music; Chris Jedi	3:07
10.	"Independiente"	Gutiérrez; Pina; Rivera; Ortiz	Gaby Music; Jeday	3:06
11.	"Lamento Tu Pérdida"	Gutiérrez; Pina; Rivera; Rodríguez	Gaby Music; Fortuna La Super F	2:41
12.	"Te Lo Dije" (with Anitta)	Gutiérrez; Pina; Rivera; Restrepo; Ayala; Quiles	Gaby Music	3:12
13.	"Ya Lo Sé"	Gutiérrez; Pina; Rivera; Rodríguez	Gaby Music; Fortuna La Super F	3:17
14.	"Quién Sabe"	Gutiérrez; Pina; Gabriel Cruz; Lenny Santos; Yoel Damas	Lenny Santos	4:29
15.	"Devórame"	Gutiérrez; Pina; Rivera; Restrepo; Quiles; Waldemar Cancel	WallyTMW; Gaby Music	3:26
16.	"La Mejor Version de Mí"	Gutiérrez; Pina; José Inzunza	Joss Favela	2:14
17.	"Oh Daddy" (Spanglish Version)	Gutiérrez; Pina; Rivera; Rodríguez	Gaby Music; Fortuna La Super F	2:57
Total length:				54:24

Notes

- "Oh Daddy" contains an interpolation from "Donna" by Ritchie Valens.
- Writing credits adapted from Warner/Chappell Music.
- Production credits adapted from the album liner notes.

== Charts ==
=== Weekly charts ===
Chart (2019)	Peak position
US Billboard 200	149
US Top Latin Albums (Billboard)	3
US Latin Rhythm Albums (Billboard)	3

=== Year-end charts ===
Chart (2019)	Position
US Top Latin Albums (Billboard)	25
Chart (2020)	Position
US Top Latin Albums (Billboard)	45

== Certifications ==
Region	Certification	Certified units/sales
United States (RIAA)	Platinum (Latin)	60,000^{‡}
^{‡} Sales+streaming figures based on certification alone.
