= Fortuna La Super F =

Fortuna La Súper F
- Born: Israel Domingo Rodriguez De La Cruz; Herrera, Santo Domingo, Dominican Republic
- Genres: Latin pop, merengue
- Occupations: Singer, songwriter, record producer
- Years active: 2011–present
- Labels: EVT Music, Sony Music
- Website: www.fortunalasuperf.com

Israel Domingo Rodriguez De La Cruz (born April 5, 1992), known professionally as Fortuna La Súper F, is a Dominican singer-songwriter and record producer from Santo Domingo, Dominican Republic. At a young age, Fortuna took an interest in music and at the age of 11, wrote his first song, which led him to discover his talent in music and writing. At the age of 15, he created his own recording studio in his home where he was able to begin his journey of further exploring his musical talent.

In August 2011, Fortuna participated in Red Bull Talento de Calle singing competition, where he landed in the top 10. Now, in 2012, this young talented individual received the support of Emiliano Vasquez (CEO of EVT Music), whom he signed with and joined the EVT Music/ Sony Music collection of artists. EVT Music has a record deal agreement with Sony Music Latin.

== 2012–present ==
Fortuna's first single "Dime Que Te Paso" featuring Latin Grammy award winner Nacho from the Venezuelan duo Chino y Nacho was released in July 2012. "Dime Que Te Paso" is an adaptation of the song from Puerto Rican superstars Wisin y Yandel. After success and exposure in Dominican Republic, United States, and Venezuela, Fortuna's fan base started to significantly increase following the release of this single.

Fortuna has been honored to begin his career with two unique singles featuring very popular and talented Latin artists. Following the release of his first single with Nacho, he then continued to his second single with Fuego (singer) titled "Si Tu Quieres."
