= Criminal (Natti Natasha and Ozuna song) =

2017 single by Natti Natasha and Ozuna

Single by Natti Natasha and Ozuna
- Language: Spanish
- Released: 18 August 2017
- Genre: Reggaeton
- Length: 3:52
- Label: Pina
- Songwriters: Natalia Gutiérrez; Juan Carlos Ozuna; Egbert Rosa; Jesús Nieves; Rafael Pina; Vicente Saavedra
- Producer: Haze

Natti Natasha singles chronology
"Otra Cosa" (2016)	"Criminal" (2017)	"Amantes de una Noche" (2018)

Ozuna singles chronology
"Se Preparó" (2017)	"Criminal" (2017)	"Egoísta" (2017)

Music video
- "Criminal" on YouTube

"Criminal" is a song by Dominican singer Natti Natasha and Puerto Rican singer Ozuna, released by Pina Records on 18 August 2017. Written by the two singers, Jhay Cortez, Rafael Pina, Vicente Saavedra and its producer Haze, it is a reggaeton song with drum programming and forceful bass patterns indebted to the dancehall genre. The accompanying music video was directed by Nuno Gómes at an abandoned women's prison in Vega Alta, Puerto Rico, and portrays Ozuna as a prison director falling in love with a prisoner played by Natasha. It received over one billion views on YouTube within five months of its release and was the most watched music video by a female singer in 2017.

The track was well received by music critics who found it catchy and praised it for giving reggaeton dance floor appeal. It received a number of award nominations, winning Best Collaboration at the 2018 Soberano Awards. "Criminal" became a crossover success and helped relaunch Natasha's music career, becoming her first top five single on the US Hot Latin Songs chart since 2012's "Dutty Love" and first chart-topper in Spain where it spent three consecutive weeks at number one. It also topped the charts in El Salvador, Paraguay, Peru and Spain, and reached the top 10 in 10 other Latin American countries.

== Background ==
"Criminal" was written by Natasha, Ozuna, Jhay Cortez, Rafael Pina, Vicente Saavedra and its producer Haze. Pina, Natasha's manager, sent Ozuna the song after two previously failed collaboration attempts, and Ozuna called it a "home run". Pina recalled, "After several months of trying to bring up the song, there was always a situation that would have discouraged anybody but, unlike me, I never got up with a 'no' in my head and continued without anything or anyone stopping me." Natasha regards "Criminal" as her second chance at a career in music and her first solo release where she had sufficient record label support. Regarding the writing process, she said: "To me, it's such a special song because I had the opportunity to write my part of the lyrics and I just really loved it. When Ozuna agreed, I was extremely excited and for some reason, I knew people were going to love it as much as we did."

It is a reggaeton song with drum programming and forceful bass patterns indebted to the dancehall genre.

== Music video ==
Ozuna approaching Natasha in an electric chair for a kiss in the music video.

The accompanying music video was directed by Venezuelan director Nuno Gómes. It was filmed at a deactivated women's prison in Vega Alta, Puerto Rico in April 2017 and inspired by the music video for Lady Gaga's "Telephone". A storm hit Vega Alta a day before the video shoot, resulting in trucks getting stuck in mud and the video wardrobe getting wet. Gómes called it the worst filming day of his career. Filming took nearly 20 hours. Fashion designer Nelson Tavárez chose bold ensembles for Natasha's wardrobe to portray her character as empowered and confident.

Natasha plays a prisoner trying to attract the attention of Ozuna, the prison director. The clip starts with Natasha being escorted to the prison where Ozuna awaits. They are shown in several locations inside the prison with Natasha performing sensual dances for Ozuna. The video reaches a climax with Natasha sitting in an electric chair and Ozuna approaching her for a kiss. Both are struck by electricity, but are shown together amid police alarms in the final scene.

The video led YouTube's weekly chart for two consecutive weeks in November 2017, ending Luis Fonsi's 35-week run at number one with "Despacito". It surpassed 1 billion views on YouTube within five months of its 18 August 2017 release and was the most watched music video by a female artist in 2017. "Criminal" is one of the 100 most viewed videos and eight most viewed Spanish-language videos on YouTube, having received over 2.7 billion views as of November 2025. It is also both Natasha and Ozuna's most watched music video on the platform. Natasha said YouTube provided her with "the opportunity to reach other parts of the world, when before we depended on a label for that. It's definitely an achievement not only for me, but for Latina women. Before we did not have that reach." Billboard included "Criminal" at number 11 in its list of Top 25 Sexiest Latin Music Videos. Tommy Calle of Hoy wrote that Natasha's "sensuality and beauty" in the video "stands out to the eye".

== Critical reception ==
"Criminal" was well received by music critics. Leila Cobo of Billboard described the song as "sexy without being vulgar" and said its "immediate catchiness" made it "a YouTube sensation". Marjua Esteves of the same website wrote that it is "not your everyday fast-pumping reggaeton record, but a criminally slow-grinding jam". Raquel Reichard of The Fader called the track a "knockout" and an "earworm". Writing for Maxim, Brandon Friederich found the song "contagious" and wrote, "Even if you're a non-Spanish speaker, just try resisting the urge to sing the 'muy criminal'-laden chorus". Los 40's Alberto Palao Murcia commented, "I timidly gave the track a play expecting a more Latin rhythm that does not even reach the dance floor, but, to my surprise, by the second chorus I was already singing 'Criminal, Cri-Criminal..." Similarly, Tommy Calle of Hoy called it "an urban anthem that has managed to turn on the dance floor", and "a catchy song that lifts everyone's spirits".

Billboard placed "Criminal" at number 17 in its list of Top 20 Best Latin Songs of 2017. Idolator's Mike Wass gave the song an honorable mention in his list of The Best Latin Pop Songs of 2017.

=== Awards and nominations ===
Year	Organization	Award/work	Result	Ref.
2018	Soberano Awards	Collaboration of the Year	Won	
2018	MTV Millennial Awards	Collaboration of the Year	Nominated	
2019	BMI Latin Awards	Award Winning Song	Won	
2019	Heat Latin Music Awards	Collaboration of the Year	Nominated	

== Live performances ==
Natasha and Ozuna performed "Criminal" together at Calibash LA 2018 on 20 January and at the Soberano Awards on 21 March 2018. On 21 June 2018, Natasha performed the song at VidCon in Anaheim, California. She also performed the track at KLVE's Las Qué Mandan event at the Inglewood Forum on 17 November 2018.

== Charts ==
=== Weekly charts ===
Chart (2017–18)	Peak position
Argentina (Monitor Latino)	7
Bolivia (Monitor Latino)	3
Chile (Monitor Latino)	4
Colombia (National-Report)	4
Dominican Republic (Monitor Latino)	3
Ecuador (National-Report)	19
El Salvador (Monitor Latino)	1
Guatemala (Monitor Latino)	9
Honduras (Monitor Latino)	2
Italy (FIMI)	69
Mexico Airplay (Billboard)	48
Nicaragua (Monitor Latino)	2
Panama (Monitor Latino)	9
Paraguay (Monitor Latino)	1
Peru (Monitor Latino)	1
Portugal (AFP)	89
Spain (PROMUSICAE)	1
Sweden Heatseeker (Sverigetopplistan)	19
Switzerland (Schweizer Hitparade)	91
Uruguay (Monitor Latino)	2
US Billboard Hot 100	95
US Hot Latin Songs (Billboard)	5
US Latin Airplay (Billboard)	12
US Latin Rhythm Airplay (Billboard)	10
Venezuela (National-Report)	18

=== Year-end charts ===
Chart (2017)	Position
Dominican Republic (Monitor Latino)	67
El Salvador (Monitor Latino)	10
Honduras (Monitor Latino)	3
Nicaragua (Monitor Latino)	2
Spain (PROMUSICAE)	43
US Hot Latin Songs (Billboard)	48

Chart (2018)	Position
Argentina (Monitor Latino)	18
Bolivia (Monitor Latino)	15
Chile (Monitor Latino)	28
Costa Rica (Monitor Latino)	98
Dominican Republic (Monitor Latino)	66
El Salvador (Monitor Latino)	10
Guatemala (Monitor Latino)	20
Honduras (Monitor Latino)	10
Nicaragua (Monitor Latino)	7
Panama (Monitor Latino)	27
Paraguay (Monitor Latino)	34
Peru (Monitor Latino)	16
Spain (PROMUSICAE)	29
Uruguay (Monitor Latino)	43
US Hot Latin Songs (Billboard)	20

== Certifications ==
Region	Certification	Certified units/sales
France (SNEP)	Gold	100,000^{‡}
Italy (FIMI)	2× Platinum	100,000^{‡}
Spain (Promusicae)	5× Platinum	300,000^{‡}
United States (RIAA)	15× Platinum (Latin)	900,000^{‡}
^{‡} Sales+streaming figures based on certification alone.
