= Magnifico (music producer) =

- Born: Hector David Lomboy Vega; San Juan, Puerto Rico
- Other names: The BeatMonsta
- Years active: 2004-present

Hector David Lomboy Vega, known as Magnifico, is a music producer born in San Juan, Puerto Rico, in 1989.

He started his career in 2004, and at 15 he had his first experience in the Christian Reggaeton industry with Manny Montes.

Among some of his most known works are the song "Le Llego Donde Sea" by Arcángel and Jory Boy's album "Matando La Liga". He also worked on the song "Po' Encima" by Arcangel and Bryant Myers and worked on Arcangel's fourth studio album, Historias de un Capricornio.

He is signed to the record label Rich Music.
