= Justin Quiles =

Puerto Rican-American singer (born 1990)

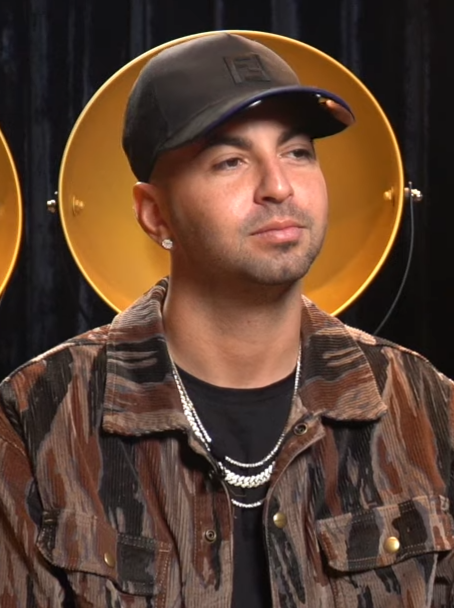
- Quiles in 2021

Background information
- Also known as: J Quiles
- Born: Justin Rafael Quiles Rivera; March 29, 1990 (age 36); Bridgeport, Connecticut, U.S.
- Genres: Reggaeton; Latin pop; Latin trap
- Occupation: Singer
- Instrument: Vocals
- Years active: 2010–present
- Label: Warner Latina
- Partner: Tiyada Katesritrakul (2017–present)

Justin Rafael Quiles Rivera (born March 29, 1990), known professionally as Justin Quiles, is an American singer. He specializes in reggaeton, although his repertoire also includes genres such as Latin pop and Latin trap.

Quiles has been nominated for Premios Juventud. Besides writing his own songs, Quiles has written for his colleagues, most notably "Pierde Los Modales", by J Balvin feat. Daddy Yankee, "Take It Off", by Lil Jon feat. Yandel & Becky G, "Recuérdame", by Maluma, "Loba" and "Mi Nena", by Yandel, "Downtown" by Anitta feat. J Balvin and "Bichota", by Karol G where he also did backing vocals.

Since August 2013, Quiles has been signed to record label Rich Music. In February 2017, Rich Music and Quiles signed a distribution deal with Warner Music's Latin division.

== Early life and career beginnings ==
Quiles was born in Bridgeport, Connecticut, to a Puerto Rican family, and was raised in Aguadilla, Puerto Rico but moved back to Connecticut to finish high school. He has stated in interviews that his father was abusive to his mother, which is why they had to move back to Puerto Rico. He wrote his first song when he was 13 and says he grew up influenced by the music his older brother listened to, such as El General, salsa and hip hop, as well as Wisin y Yandel, Tego Calderon and Don Omar.

Quiles moved back to Puerto Rico to become a singer. He started collaborating with the duo Genio & Baby Johnny. A year later, he went back to Orlando, where he recorded his first single, "Algo Contigo" with producer Lelo.

Quiles signed with the record label Rich Music, based in Miami, in August 2013. His first single with Rich Music was the song "Orgullo", and a remix featuring the Colombian singer J Balvin, which became a Top 20 hit on the Billboard Latin Rhythm Airplay chart.

== Career ==
=== 2015: Carpe Diem and other singles ===
Quiles' first album, Carpe Diem, was released in March 2015 and featured the songs "No La Toques", "Nos Envidian". That same year, he also released the single "Me Curare", which gained traction with a remix featuring Colombiano singer Maluma and peaked at number 7 on the Billboard Tropical Songs chart.

=== 2016–2017: La Promesa and future ===
On July 29, 2016, Quiles released his second studio album, La Promesa (The Promise), which is how he is sometimes referred to. The album debuted on the Billboard charts as the #1 Latin Rhythm Album and #2 Latin Album overall. The main hit song on that album is "Si Ella Quisiera", which also got a remix by Yandel & Gadiel. The song peaked at number 8 on the Billboard Tropical Songs chart and number 20 on the Billboard Latin Pop Songs chart and was certified Platinum in Spain.

Prior to releasing La Promesa, Quiles had released the mixtape Imperio Nazza: Justin Quiles Edition, produced by duo Musicólogo y Menes. Prior to that, he had been featured on their album Orion, which produced his song, "Si El Mundo Se Acabara". That same year, he also released the EP JQ Miliano, his alter ego, which featured the songs "Culpable", "Ella Baila" (and a remix featuring Messiah).

In 2017, Quiles released the song "Crecia" ft. Bad Bunny & Almighty in the new genre of Latin Trap. He also released the songs "Cuestion De Tiempo" ft. Jory Boy and "Tu Pollo" ft. Sech, and was featured along with Fuego on "Baila Toma" by Osmani Garcia and "Todo Cambio", by Becky G. In July 2017, he opened Premios Juventud with a performance of the song "Egoista". The song peaked at 18th on the Billboard Latin Pop Songs chart and 25th on the Billboard Latin Airplay chart.

== Personal life ==
Quiles endorsed Donald Trump's 2024 presidential campaign, speaking at a campaign rally in August 2024.

== Discography ==
=== Albums ===
List of studio albums with details and selected chart positions
Title	Album details	Peak chart positions				Certifications
Title	Album details	US Ind	US Latin	US Latin Rhythm	SPA	Certifications
La Promesa	Released: July 29, 2016; Label: Warner Music Latina; Format: CD, Digital download, streaming	22	2	1	89	
Realidad	Released: May 31, 2019; Label: Warner Music Latina; Format: Digital download, streaming	—	30	—	7	
La Última Promesa	Released: August 19, 2021; Label: Warner Music Latina; Format: Digital download, streaming	—	12	9	4	RIAA: Platinum (Latin)
"—" denotes a recording that did not chart or was not released in that territory.

=== Collaboration albums ===
List of collaboration albums with details and selected chart positions
Title	Album details	Peak chart positions				Certifications
Title	Album details	US Ind	US Latin	US Latin Rhythm	SPA	Certifications
The Academy (Rich Music, Sech and Dalex featuring Justin Quiles, Lenny Tavárez and Feid)	Released: July 29, 2016; Label: Rich Music; Format: Digital download, streaming	—	—	—	20	RIAA: Platinum (Latin)
SUPERARTE (with Lenny Tavárez)	Released: February 19, 2026; Label: Warner Music Latina; Format: Digital download, streaming	—	—	—	40	
"—" denotes a recording that did not chart or was not released in that territory.

=== Mixtapes ===
List of mixtapes with details selected chart positions
Title	Album details	Peak chart positions			
Title	Album details	US Ind	US Latin	US Latin Rhythm	SPA
Imperio Nazza: Justin Quiles Edition	Released: January 22, 2016; Label: Nazza Records/Rich Music; Format: Digital download, streaming	—	9	2	—
"—" denotes a recording that did not chart or was not released in that territory.

=== EPs ===
List of EPs with details
Title	EP details
Carpe Diem	Released: March 9, 2015; Label: Rimas Music; Format: Digital download, streaming
JQMiliano	Released: June 3, 2016; Label: Rich Music; Format: Digital download, streaming

=== Singles ===
==== As lead artist ====
List of singles as lead artist, with selected chart positions and certifications, showing year released and album name
Title	Year	Peak chart positions				Certifications	Album
Title	Year	US Latin	US Latin Pop	ARG	SPA	Certifications	Album
"La Nena Mia"	2011	—	—	—	—		Non-album singles
"Un Nueva Vida"	2011	—	—	—	—		Non-album singles
"A Punto De Estallar" (with Divino)	2012	—	—	—	—		Non-album singles
"Puteria"	2012	—	—	—	—		Non-album singles
"Quien por Ti"	2012	—	—	—	—		Non-album singles
"Aumentan Mis Desos"	2013	—	—	—	—		Non-album singles
"Somos Amantes"	2013	—	—	—	—		Non-album singles
"Despedida Inesperada"	2013	—	—	—	—		Non-album singles
"Preciosura"	2013	—	—	—	—		Non-album singles
"Pude Olvidarte"	2013	—	—	—	—		Non-album singles
"Que Retumbe el Bajo"	2013	—	—	—	—		Non-album singles
"No Te Necesito"	2013	—	—	—	—		Non-album singles
"Una Nota"	2013	—	—	—	—		Non-album singles
"Detras de Ti"	2013	—	—	—	—		Non-album singles
"Yo Me Imagino"	2013	—	—	—	—		Non-album singles
"Se Hizo de Noche"	2013	—	—	—			Non-album singles
"Algo Contigo"	2013	—	—	—	—		Non-album singles
"Orgullo" (solo or with J Balvin)	2014	—	—	—	—		Non-album singles
"Me la Lleve"	2014	—	—	—	—		Non-album singles
"Tienes Miedo"	2014	—	—	—	—		Non-album singles
"Esta Noche" (solo or with J Alvarez and Maluma or with Farruko)	2014	—	—	—	—		Non-album singles
"Maria"	2014	—	33	—	—		Non-album singles
"Mi Maldición"	2014	—	—	—	—		Non-album singles
"Rabia"	2014	—	—	—	—		Non-album singles
"Sin Tu Amor"	2014	—	—	—	—		Non-album singles
"No la Toques"	2014	—	—	—	—		Non-album singles
"Nos Envidian"	2014	—	—	—	—		Non-album singles
"Sustancia"	2014	—	—	—	—		Non-album singles
"Dos Locos"	2014	—	—	—	—		Non-album singles
"Me Curare" (solo or with Maluma)	2015	—	37	—	88		Non-album singles
"Partysera Mala"	2015	—	—	—	—		Non-album singles
"Nunca Imagine (Remix)" (with Kevin Roldan)	2015	—	—	—	—		Non-album singles
"Hotline Bling (Spanish Remix)"	2015	—	—	—	—		Non-album singles
"No Sabes del Amor (Remix)" (with Akim)	2015	—	—	—	—		Non-album singles
"Si Ella Quisiera" (solo or with Yandel and Gadiel)	2016	28	20	—	56	PROMUSICAE: Platinum	Non-album singles
"Desaparecida"	2016	—	—	—	—		Non-album singles
"Otra Liga"	2016	—	—	—	—		JQMILIANO
"Original Me Salio"	2016	—	—	—	—		JQMILIANO
"Lo Perdona"	2016	—	—	—	—		JQMILIANO
"Ella Baila" (solo or with Messiah)	2016	—	—	—	—		JQMILIANO
"Culpable"	2016	—	—	—	—		JQMILIANO
"Crecia" (with Bad Bunny and Almighty)	2017	—	—	—	—		Non-album singles
"Cuestion de Tiempo"	2017	—	—	—	—		Non-album singles
"Tu Pollo" (with Sech and Dímelo Flow)	2017	—	—	—	—		Non-album singles
"Romance" (with Nacho)	2017	—	—	—	—		Non-album singles
"Media Hora" (with EZ El Ezeta and Farruko)	2017	—	—	—	—		Non-album singles
"Tócate Toda" (with Jacob Forever)	2017	—	—	—	—		Non-album singles
"Egoísta"	2017	45	18	—	—		Non-album singles
"Ropa Interior"	2017	46	18	—	—		Non-album singles
"No Quiero Amarte" (featuring Zion & Lennox)	2018	48	15	—	42	RIAA: Platinum (Latin); PROMUSICAE: Platinum	Realidad
"Cristina" (with Maffio and Nacho featuring Shelow Shaq)	2019	—	—	—	7	RIAA: Platinum (Latin); PROMUSICAE: 2× Platinum	TumbaGobierno
"Qué Más Pues" (Remix) (with Sech and Maluma featuring Nicky Jam, Farruko, Dalex and Lenny Tavárez)	2019	—	—	—	18	RIAA: 2× Platinum (Latin); PROMUSICAE: Platinum	Sueños
"Comerte A Besos" (with Nicky Jam and Wisin)	2019	—	—	95	—		Realidad
"Cuaderno" (with Dalex and Nicky Jam featuring Sech, Lenny Tavárez, Feid and Rafa Pabön)	2019	47	—	13	15	RIAA: 6× Platinum (Latin); PROMUSICAE: Platinum	Climaxxx
"DJ No Pare" (Remix) (featuring Natti Natasha, Farruko, Zion, Dalex and Lenny Tavárez)	2019	—	33	17	—	RIAA: Platinum (Latin)	Non-album single
"Porfa" (with Feid)	2019	11	18	2	5	RIAA: 4× Platinum (Latin); PROMUSICAE: 3× Platinum	FERXXO (VOL 1: M.O.R)
"La Pared 360" (with Lenny Tavárez)	2020	—	34	36	69		KRACK
"Perfume" (with Dalex and Sech)	2020	—	—	—	67		Modo Avión
"Pam" (with Daddy Yankee and El Alfa)	2020	14	14	26	1	RIAA: 5× Platinum (Latin); PROMUSICAE: 2× Platinum	La Última Promesa
"Jeans"	2020	34	—	4	22	RIAA: 2× Platinum (Latin); CAPIF: 2× Platinum; PROMUSICAE: Platinum	La Última Promesa
"Tussi" (with Arcángel and Eladio Carrión)	2020	—	—	—	24	RIAA: Gold (Latin); PROMUSICAE: Platinum	Los Favoritos 2
"Qué Mal Te Fue" (Remix) (with Natti Natasha and Miky Woodz)	2020	—	—	—	90		Nattividad
"Ponte Pa' Mí"	2020	—	—	22	64	RIAA: 2× Platinum (Latin); PROMUSICAE: Gold	La Última Promesa
"Como Si Nah" (with Arcángel and Dalex featuring Kevvo)	2021	—	—	—	82		Non-album single
"Cuántas veces" (with Danny Ocean)	2021	—	13	91	—	RIAA: Gold (Latin)	@dannocean
"Todos Perreando" (with El Coyote The Show, Nio Garcia and De La Ghetto)	2021	—	—	—	—		Non-album singles
"Conexión" (with Foreign Teck and Jay Wheeler featuring Eladio Carrión, Bryant Myers and Tory Lanez)	2021	—	—	—	83	RIAA: Platinum (Latin)	Non-album singles
"Loco" (With Chimbala and Zion & Lennox)	2021	13	—	—	4	PROMUSICAE: 5× Platinum	La Última Promesa
"Dime Donde" (With Cazzu)	2021	—	—	51	—		Non-album singles
"Se Le Ve" (with Dímelo Flow, Sech, Lenny Tavárez, Arcángel, De La Ghetto, and Dalex)	2021	—	—	54	92	PROMUSICAE: 3× Platinum; RIAA: 3× Platinum (Latin)	Non-album singles
"Unfollow" (with Duki and Bizarrap)	2021	—	—	19	17	PROMUSICAE: Gold	Temporada de Reggaetón
"Envolver" (Remix) (with Anitta)	2022	—	—	—	—		Non-album singles
"Gucci Fendi" (with Eladio Carrión)	2022	—	—	—	82		Non-album singles
"AEIOU" (with Robin Schulz)	2022	—	—	—	64		Non-album singles
"Whiskey y Coco" (with Myke Towers)	2023	—	—	—	31		Non-album singles
"La Hora y el Día" (with Daddy Yankee and Dalex)	2023	—	—	—	85		
"—" denotes a recording that did not chart or was not released in that territory.

==== As featured artist ====
List of singles as featured artist, with selected chart positions and certifications, showing year released and album name
Title	Year	Peak chart positions				Certifications	Album
Title	Year	US Latin	US Latin Pop	ARG	SPA	Certifications	Album
"Baila Toma" (Osmani Garcia featuring Justin Quiles and Fuego)	2016	—	34	—	—		Non-album singles
"Mujeres" (Mozart La Para featuring Justin Quiles)	2018	—	37	56	3	RIAA: Gold (Latin); PROMUSICAE: 2× Platinum	Non-album singles
"Jaque Mate" (Maikel Delacalle featuring Justin Quiles)	2018	—	—	—	75		Non-album singles
"Solo Pienso En Ti" (Paulo Londra featuring De La Ghetto and Justin Quiles)	2019	—	—	11	33		Homerun
"Quizás" (Rich Music, Sech and Dalex featuring Justin Quiles, Lenny Tavárez, Wisin, Zion and Feid)	2019	41	—	31	15	RIAA: 4× Platinum (Latin); PROMUSICAE: Platinum	The Academy
"Bellaquita" (Remix) (Dalex, Lenny Tavárez and Anitta featuring Natti Natasha, Farruko and Justin Quiles)	2019	—	—	—	26		Non-album single
"Elegí (Remix)" (Rauw Alejandro, Dalex and Lenny Tavárez featuring Farruko, Anuel AA, Sech, Dímelo Flow and Justin Quiles)	2020	—	—	—	61		Afrodisíaco
"Singapur" (Remix) (El Alfa, Farruko and Myke Towers featuring Chencho Corleone and Justin Quiles)	2020	46	—	38	—		Non-album single
"Ojos Ferrari" with (Karol G and Ángel Dior)	2023	46	—	38	—		Mañana Será Bonito
"—" denotes a recording that did not chart or was not released in that territory.

=== Other charted and certified songs ===
List of other songs with selected chart positions and certifications, showing year released and album name
Title	Year	Peak chart positions				Certifications	Album
Title	Year	US Latin	US Latin Pop	ARG	SPA	Certifications	Album
"Si El Mundo Se Acabara"	2016	45	21	—	—		Imperio Nazza: Justin Quiles Edition
"Otra Copa" (featuring Farruko)	2016	—	—	—	96		La Promesa
"Ganas sobran" (Bryant Myers and Miky Woodz featuring Justin Quiles)	2019	—	—	—	20	PROMUSICAE: Platinum	Cambio de Clima
"Miss Lonely" (Remix) (with Sech, De La Ghetto, and Dimelo Flow)	2019	—	—	—	—	RIAA: Gold (Latin)	Sueños
"DJ No Pare"	2019	—	—	—	12	PROMUSICAE: 2× Platinum	Realidad
"Feel Me" (Rich Music, Sech and Dalex featuring Justin Quiles, Lenny Tavárez, Feid and Mariah Angeliq)	2019	—	—	10	—		The Academy
"Perreo en la luna" (Rich Music, Sech and Dalex featuring Justin Quiles, Lenny Tavárez and Feid)	2019	—	—	—	27	PROMUSICAE: Platinum	The Academy
"Uniforme" (Rich Music, Sech and Dalex featuring Justin Quiles, Lenny Tavárez, Feid, De La Ghetto and Zion & Lennox)	2019	—	—	—	91		The Academy
"Fabuloso" (Sech featuring Justin Quiles)	2020	—	—	37	8	PROMUSICAE: 2× Platinum	1 of 1
"Cosas Malas" (with Manuel Turizo and Dalex)	2021	—	—	71	—		Dopamina
"Colorín Colorado"	2021	—	—	54	12	RIAA: Gold (Latin); PROMUSICAE: Platinum	La Última Promesa
"La Botella" (with Maluma)	2021	—	—	—	25	RIAA: Platinum (Latin); PROMUSICAE: Platinum	La Última Promesa
"Parce" (Maluma featuring Lenny Tavárez and Justin Quiles)	2021	—	—	—	32	PROMUSICAE: Platinum	Papi Juancho
"Medallo" (with Blessd and Lenny Tavárez)	2021	22	—	27	27	RIAA: Platinum (Latin); PROMUSICAE: Gold	Hecho En Medellín
"Regresé" (with Sebastián Yatra and L-Gante)	2022	—	—	60	—		Dharma
"—" denotes a recording that did not chart or was not released in that territory.

== Songwriting credits ==
Song	Year	Artist(s)	Album
"Recuérdame"	2015	Maluma	Pretty Boy, Dirty Boy
"Loba"	2015	Yandel	Dangerous
"Por Un Día"	2016	J Balvin	Energia
"Primera Cita"	2016	J Balvin	Energia
"Take It Off"	2016	Lil Jon, Yandel, Becky G	Non-album singles
"Downtown"	2017	Anitta, J Balvin	Non-album singles
"Indecente"	2018	Anitta	Non-album singles
"Rompe El Suelo"	2019	Farruko	Gangalee
"Loco Contigo"	2019	DJ Snake, J Balvin, Tyga	Carte Blanche
"Make It Hot"	2019	Major Lazer, Anitta	Non-album singles
"Bota Fuego"	2019	Mau y Ricky, Nicky Jam	Non-album singles
"Vámonos"	2019	Becky G, Sech	Mala Santa
"Rojo"	2020	J Balvin	Colores
"Azul"	2020	J Balvin	Colores
"Gris"	2020	J Balvin	Colores
"Que Mal Te Fue"	2020	Natti Natasha	Nattividad
"Bichota"	2020	Karol G	KG0516
"Problema"	2021	Daddy Yankee	Non-album single
"Las Nenas"	2021	Natti Natasha, Cazzu, Farina, La Duraca	Nattividad
"Déjalos Que Miren"	2021	Karol G	KG0516
"Ram Pam Pam"	2021	Natti Natasha, Becky G	Nattividad and Esquemas
"Sejodioto"	2021	Karol G	Non-album single
"Cositas de la USA"	2022	Maluma	The Love & Sex Tape
"Saoko"	2022	Rosalía	Motomami
"Mamiii"	2022	Becky G, Karol G	Esquemas
"Para Siempre"	2022	Daddy Yankee, Sech	Legendaddy
"La Ola"	2022	Daddy Yankee	Legendaddy
"Sigue"	2022	J Balvin, Ed Sheeran	Non-album singles
"Forever My Love"	2022	J Balvin, Ed Sheeran	Non-album singles
"La Vida es Bella"	2022	Maluma	The Love & Sex Tape
"Tsunami"	2022	Maluma, Arcángel, De La Ghetto	The Love & Sex Tape
"Ya que carajo"	2022	‌iZaak, Dalex, Dímelo Flow	Non-album single
"Gatúbela"	2022	Karol G, Maldy	Mañana Será Bonito
"La Realidad"	2022	Wisin & Yandel, J Balvin	La Última Misión
"Esta Noche"	2022	Sech	Ya Casi Vienen
"Besties"	2023	Karol G	Mañana Será Bonito
"Beachy"	2023	Daddy Yankee, Omar Courtz	Non-album single

== Awards and nominations ==
=== Premios Juventud ===
Year	Category	Result
2017	Best New Artist	Nominated
