= Sin Pijama =

2018 single by Becky G and Natti Natasha

Single by Becky G and Natti Natasha

from the album Mala Santa
- Language: Spanish
- English title: "Without Pajamas"
- Released: April 20, 2018
- Genre: Reggaeton
- Length: 3:08
- Label: Sony Latin
- Songwriters: Rebbeca Gomez; Natalia Gutiérrez; Nate Campany; Kyle Shearer; Rafael Pina; Ramón Ayala; Gabriel Rivera; Ricky Montaner; Mau Montaner; Jon Leone; Camilo Echeverry
- Producers: Daddy Yankee; Gaby Music

Becky G singles chronology
"Ya Es Hora" (2018)	"Sin Pijama" (2018)	"Don't Go" (2018)

Natti Natasha singles chronology
"El Baño (Remix)" (2018)	"Sin Pijama" (2018)	"No Me Acuerdo" (2018)

Music video
- "Sin Pijama" on YouTube

"Sin Pijama" is a song by American singer Becky G and Dominican singer Natti Natasha. It was written by the two singers, Nate Campany, Kyle Sherear, Rafael Pina, Mau y Ricky, Jon Leone, Camilo Echeverry and its producers Daddy Yankee and Gaby Music. The song and its music video were released by on April 20, 2018. It became both Gomez and Natasha's third top 10 hit on US Hot Latin Songs and has reached number one in Bolivia, Chile, El Salvador and Spain as well as the top 10 in Guatemala, Honduras, Nicaragua, Peru and Uruguay. "Sin Pijama" received a Latin platinum certification in the US and surpassed 100 million views on YouTube/Vevo within 3 weeks of its release. As of 2022, it has been certified 38-times Latin platinum.

== Background ==
"Sin Pijama" written by Becky G, Natti Natasha, Nate Campany, Kyle Sherear, Rafael Pina, Daddy Yankee, Gaby Music, Mau y Ricky, Jon Leone and Camilo Echeverry. Gomez first wrote the song during a writing session with Mau y Ricky around two years prior to its release. According to her, she had to keep fighting and reminding her record label about "Sin Pijama", and it was not until she suggested a collaboration with Natasha that the track progressed. In a discussion with Natasha for Vevo, Gomez recalled, "When I heard that you loved the song and that you wanted to do your thing on it, I was like, relieved, 'She gets it. Perfect!" She described Yankee, Gaby Music and Natasha's consecutive involvement as the missing puzzle pieces coming together. With "Sin Pijama", Gomez wanted to continue the female empowerment theme of her 2017 single "Mayores". Regarding the song, Natasha said, "Women connect with the most sensual songs because they want to see themselves portrayed in music as they really feel." Gomez confessed that the song originally intended to feature Karol G, Leslie Grace and Lali, adding: "There's more women in the Latin music space right now, and I'm proud to call them my friends."

== Music and lyrics ==
Composed in 4/4 time, "Sin Pijama" is a reggaeton song spanning three minutes and eight seconds. It has an urban and Latin rhythm, and is described by Gomez as more reggaeton than "Mayores". The lyrics discuss a desire for sex, using double entendres for a couple not being able to sleep because one of them left their pajamas at home. It includes references to smoking cannabis. The singer said the lyrics detail "the great fantasy of men" to know what happens between women at a sleepover. She regards "Sin Pijama" as empowering for women owning their sexuality, a theme she believes is uncommon and should be accepted, specifically in Latin music.

According to Telemundo, the lyrics caused controversy for its explicit themes to which Becky G responded to in an interview for Suelta la Sopa, saying: "I am a woman; I am 21 years old and I am not the father of your children. If you do not want your daughter or your son to listen to my music, it's your decision and I respect it totally. But if you're going to let your daughter or your son listen to Maluma, Bad Bunny or Ozuna because they're men, that's the problem. There are so many things that I can not understand. It makes me very sad." Spanish singer Beatriz Luengo criticized the song's intended feminist message and claimed that it instead spoke of sexuality to only please men, citing it as "men writing what they would like women to say."

== Critical reception ==
"Sin Pijama" received positive reviews from music critics upon release. Suzette Fernandez of Billboard magazine said it proves "women are taking control in Latin music" and "can also dominate the urban genre." She deemed the song "a girl power anthem". In Hoy, Sergio Burstein regarded its "duo between two famous ladies at the rhythm of reggaeton" as a first for Latin music and wrote, instead of pushing feminism in culture, it uses sex in advertising to show that "girls just wanna have fun." Similarly, Bárbara Figueroa González of Ronda magazine believed "Sin Pijama" marked "a great step for women in the urban genre." La República called the track "catchy", while Clarín viewed it as "a sensual hit, provocative and catchy". EFE's David Villafranca wrote, "With a rhythm and a sexy air that directly resemble her with 'Mayores', 'Sin Pijama' allowed Becky G to expand her list of collaborations". Mike Wass of Idolator found the song "sexy" and said Becky G "has gone from strength to strength".

== Chart performance ==
"Sin Pijama" became both Gomez and Natasha's third top 10 hit on the US Hot Latin Songs chart where it debuted at number 10, marking Natasha's highest debut on the chart. It received 5 million streams, 2 million audience impressions and sold 7,000 copies in its first week. The song rose to number four in its fifteenth week, and reached number 70 on the US Billboard Hot 100 chart. It was certified platinum by the Recording Industry Association of America (RIAA) within 18 days of its release. Outside the U.S., "Sin Pijama" entered the Productores de Música de España (PROMUSICAE) singles chart at number 28. It has since reached number one, thus making it both Gomez and Natti Natasha's second song to top the chart in Spain. PROMUSICAE certified the single Platinum for sales of 40,000 units in the region. Across Latin America, the song has charted in the top ten of the Monitor Latino charts in El Salvador (number four), Guatemala and Uruguay (number six), Chile and Nicaragua (number three), Honduras (number eight), and Peru (number ten).

== Music video ==
=== Development ===
External images
- The first and second page of the music video synopsis Becky G sent to Duran in a mobile note.

The music video for "Sin Pijama" was directed by Venezuelan director Daniel Duran in a one-day shoot in New York. Gomez came up with the video concept nearly a year prior to sending it to Duran in a mobile note in January 2018 and revealed that "it took a lot of fight" for it to happen. Although she had a different idea for the video's ending, Gomez said it was her favorite part because it represented reality and did not want sexuality to be the only thing she is associated with. The singer met Natasha for the first time on the music video set, but said they had "instant chemistry". In her synopsis note, she aspired for the fashion to resemble that of Victoria's Secret. The video includes a cameo appearance by American singer Prince Royce. It premiered on Gomez's Vevo channel at 00:00 PST on April 20, 2018.

=== Synopsis ===
Natasha and Becky G in a scene from Royce's dream in the music video.

The video begins with Royce and a friend at a recording studio where they talk about inviting Gomez and her friends to join them. Royce contacts Gomez through FaceTime to no answer and then sees on Twitter that they are having a girls night and begins to imagine about what the night would be like. The song and dream sequence then start with Gomez and Natasha entering a lavish mansion party in contrasting white and black dresses. Performance pieces take place around the mansion as they wear several lingerie outfits, faux fur and jewelry. The singers are seen drinking champagne, laying on a bed, playing pool, and partaking in a photo shoot and pillow fight. In a plot twist, they are shown having a sleepover in pajamas with face masks on, eating popcorn before Gomez receives a FaceTime from Royce to her delight. According to her, this scene is intended as comic relief and a reflection of what actually happens at girl sleepovers.

=== Reception ===
The music video was well received by most critics. Writing for La Nación, Felipe Gerjado regarded it as "great sensuality", while Maxim magazine found it "sultry". La Opinión called the video "the most daring moment in Becky G's career." Similarly, El Heraldo described the visual as "lace, lingerie and lots of skin", noting that the singers "show their most daring side." Sergio Burstein of Hoy opined that it had "obvious lesbian connotations". E! Online Latino said, "Becky G follows her personal instinct and triumphs." Conversely, Alberto Murcia of Los 40 believed the dream concept should have been excluded, questioning if "the only way a woman has to live her sexuality is within a man's fantasy?"

The video surpassed 100 million views on YouTube/Vevo on May 9, 2018 (less than 3 weeks after its premiere). It was the most-watched YouTube video in Colombia for April 2018, according to National-Report, and reached number two on the US YouTube Songs chart published by Billboard. The music video reached one billion views in October 2018. It was the most-watched music video by a female artist in its year of release. The clip surpassed "Side to Side" by Ariana Grande featuring Nicki Minaj as the most-viewed female collaboration and became the first to achieve 2 billion views.

== Live performances ==
Becky G and Natti Natasha performed "Sin Pijama" together for the first time at the MTV Millennial Awards on June 3, 2018. The duo performed the song again at the 2018 Premios Juventud on July 22, 2018. The song has since been included inn Gomez's performances, usually being the second-to-last or last to be performed. Gomez and Natasha performed the song together at the Coachella 2023 on April 14 and 21, 2023.

== Critical reception ==
Publication	List	Rank	Ref.
Billboard	Billboard's 20 Best Latin Songs	20	
Billboard	Billboard's 100 Best Songs	92	
Rolling Stone	Best Latin Singles	12	
Rolling Stone	100 Greatest Reggaeton Songs of All Time	85	

== Accolades ==
Awards and nominations for "Sin Pijama"
Organization	Year	Category	Result	Ref.
ASCAP Latin Music Awards	2019	Winning Songs	Won	
BMI Latin Awards	2020	Winning Songs	Won	
Latin Music Italian Awards	2018	Best Latin Female Video of The Year	Won	
Latin Music Italian Awards	2018	Best Latin Song Of The Year	Nominated	
Lo Nuestro Awards	2019	Urban Song of the Year	Won	
Lo Nuestro Awards	2019	Urban Collaboration of the Year	Won	
Premios Tu Música Urbano	2019	International Artist Song	Won	
Premios Tu Música Urbano	2019	International Artist Video	Won	

== Personnel ==
- Daddy Yankee – production
- Gaby Music – production, mix engineering, record engineering
- Mau y Ricky – co-production, vocal production
- Jon Leone – co-production, vocal production
- Camilo Echeverry – co-production, vocal production
- Mike Fuller – master engineering

Credits adapted from Qobuz.

== Charts ==
=== Weekly charts ===
Chart (2018–19)	Peak position
Argentina (Argentina Hot 100)	3
Belgium (Ultratip Bubbling Under Flanders)	20
Bolivia (Monitor Latino)	1
Chile (Monitor Latino)	1
Colombia (Monitor Latino)	9
Colombia (National-Report)	11
Costa Rica (Monitor Latino)	4
Dominican Republic (SODINPRO)	1
Dominican Republic (Monitor Latino)	2
Ecuador (Monitor Latino)	5
Ecuador (National-Report)	23
El Salvador (Monitor Latino)	1
France (SNEP)	185
Guatemala (Monitor Latino)	4
Honduras (Monitor Latino)	2
Hungary (Dance Top 40)	8
Italy (FIMI)	80
Mexico (Billboard Mexican Airplay)	15
Mexico (Mexico Español Airplay)	3
Netherlands (Single Top 100)	97
Nicaragua (Monitor Latino)	2
Paraguay (Monitor Latino)	3
Peru (Monitor Latino)	3
Poland Dance (ZPAV)	15
Portugal (AFP)	23
Puerto Rico (Monitor Latino)	19
Romania (Airplay 100)	6
Slovakia Airplay (ČNS IFPI)	35
Slovakia Singles Digital (ČNS IFPI)	27
Spain (Promusicae)	1
Sweden Heatseeker (Sverigetopplistan)	11
Switzerland (Schweizer Hitparade)	33
Uruguay (Monitor Latino)	6
US Billboard Hot 100	70
US Hot Latin Songs (Billboard)	4
US Hot Rap Songs (Billboard)	24
US Latin Airplay (Billboard)	1
US Latin Rhythm Airplay (Billboard)	1
US Regional Mexican Airplay (Billboard)	14
Venezuela (Monitor Latino)	18

=== Year-end charts ===
Chart (2018)	Position
Argentina (Monitor Latino)	30
Hungary (Dance Top 40)	38
Portugal (AFP)	72
Romania (Airplay 100)	50
Spain (PROMUSICAE)	3
US Hot Latin Songs (Billboard)	9
US Latin Pop Airplay Songs (Billboard)	9

Chart (2019)	Position
Hungary (Dance Top 40)	32
Spain (PROMUSICAE)	99

Chart (2022)	Position
Costa Rica Urbano (Monitor Latino)	75

== Certifications ==
Region	Certification	Certified units/sales
Brazil (Pro-Música Brasil)	2× Platinum	80,000^{‡}
France (SNEP)	Gold	100,000^{‡}
Italy (FIMI)	Platinum	50,000^{‡}
Mexico (AMPROFON)	2× Diamond+Platinum	660,000^{‡}
Poland (ZPAV)	Platinum	50,000^{‡}
Portugal (AFP)	Gold	5,000^{‡}
Spain (Promusicae)	6× Platinum	360,000^{‡}
Switzerland (IFPI Switzerland)	Gold	10,000^{‡}
United States (RIAA)	38× Platinum (Latin)	2,280,000^{‡}
^{‡} Sales+streaming figures based on certification alone.

== See also ==
- List of Billboard number-one Latin songs of 2018
