= Hoy (American newspaper) =

- Type: Daily newspaper
- Format: Tabloid
- Owner: Patrick Soon-Shiong
- Publisher: Tribune Publishing
- Ceased publication: December 13, 2019
- Language: Spanish
- Headquarters: Los Angeles, CA; San Diego, California; United States
- Website: www.hoylosangeles.com (Los Angeles) www.hoysd.com (San Diego)

Hoy was a brand used for Spanish-language newspapers in a number of American cities, among which were New York and Los Angeles. Before the brand was no longer used, it was owned by Patrick Soon-Shiong.

On February 12, 2007, ImpreMedia announced its purchase of Hoy's New York edition. Hoy's Chicago and Los Angeles publications were not affected by the transaction. The New York Hoy was later merged into El Diario La Prensa.

In 2018, Patrick Soon-Shiong purchased Hoy titles in Los Angeles and San Diego, as part of his purchase of the assets related to the Los Angeles Times and San Diego Union-Tribune. A year later, both were folded into the respective Spanish editions of the Times and Tribune.

On November 12, 2019, Tribune Publishing announced that it would cease print and online publication of Hoy (Chicago) effective December 13.
