= El Baño =

Single by Enrique Iglesias featuring Bad Bunny

from the album Final (Vol. 1)
- Language: Spanish
- English title: "The Bathroom"
- Released: 12 January 2018
- Genre: Reggaeton
- Length: 3:48
- Label: RCA; Sony Latin
- Songwriters: Enrique Iglesias; Benito Martínez; Francisco Saldaña; Xavier Semper; Edgar Semper; Hasibur Rahman; Servando Primera; Luian Malavé
- Producers: Carlos Paucar; Luny Tunes

Enrique Iglesias singles chronology
"Súbeme la Radio" (2017)	"El Baño" (2018)	"Nos Fuimos Lejos" (2018)

Bad Bunny singles chronology
"Amantes de una Noche" (2018)	"El Baño" (2018)	"Solita" (2018)

Music video
- "El baño" on YouTube

"El baño" (pronounced [el ˈβaɲo], transl. "The Bathroom") is a song by Spanish singer Enrique Iglesias, featuring Puerto Rican rapper Bad Bunny. Both artists also wrote it opposite Francisco Saldaña, Xavier Semper, Edgar Semper, Hasibur Rahman, Servando Primera and Luian Malavé. It was produced by Carlos Paucar and co-produced by Luny Tunes. The song was released by RCA Records and Sony Music Latin on 12 January 2018. A slightly cut version of the song was included as part of his album, Final Vol. 1. The final verse is missing, and there is a slight change in the first chorus. This version comes in at 3:34.

== Composition ==
"El Baño" is a reggaeton song with elements of Latin pop and Latin trap.

== Remixes ==
A remix featuring Dominican singer Natti Natasha was released on 9 March 2018.

== Music video ==
The music video of the song was released on 12 January 2018 on Enrique Iglesias' Vevo account. The concept for the music video was created by Iglesias' longtime creative director and collaborator Yasha Malekzad. The video was produced by Artist Preserve.

== Track listing ==
Digital download
No.	Title	Length
1.	"El Baño" (featuring Bad Bunny)	3:48

Digital download (Remix)
No.	Title	Length
1.	"El Baño Remix" (featuring Bad Bunny and Natti Natasha)	3:57

Digital download (The Remixes)
No.	Title	Length
1.	"El Baño Remix" (featuring Bad Bunny and Natti Natasha)	3:57
2.	"El Baño" (MVIENIGHT Remix)	4:06
3.	"El Baño" (Lemmarroy Remix)	3:53
4.	"El Baño" (David Rojas Remix)	3:17
5.	"El Baño" (Felix Rivera Remix)	3:08

== Charts ==
=== Weekly charts ===
2018–2019 weekly chart performance for El Baño
Chart (2018–2019)	Peak position
Argentina (Monitor Latino)	8
Belgium (Ultratip Bubbling Under Flanders)	11
Belgium (Ultratop 50 Wallonia)	22
Bolivia (Monitor Latino)	3
Brazil (Crowley Charts)	70
Bulgaria (PROPHON)	6
Chile (Monitor Latino)	8
CIS Airplay (TopHit)	72
Colombia (National-Report)	33
Costa Rica (Monitor Latino)	6
Dominican Republic (Monitor Latino)	17
Ecuador (National-Report)	5
El Salvador (Monitor Latino)	3
Guatemala (Monitor Latino)	3
Honduras (Monitor Latino)	3
Hungary (Dance Top 40)	7
Hungary (Rádiós Top 40)	9
Hungary (Single Top 40)	5
Italy (FIMI)	50
Lebanon (Lebanese Top 20)	10
Mexico (Monitor Latino)	1
Mexico (Billboard Mexican Airplay)	1
Netherlands (Dutch Tipparade 40)	16
Netherlands (Single Tip)	12
Nicaragua (Monitor Latino)	16
Panama (Monitor Latino)	17
Peru (Monitor Latino)	13
Poland Airplay (ZPAV)	14
Poland Dance (ZPAV)	2
Portugal (AFP)	64
Russia Airplay (TopHit)	62
Slovakia Airplay (ČNS IFPI)	11
Slovenia (SloTop50)	6
Spain (PROMUSICAE)	2
Sweden Heatseeker (Sverigetopplistan)	14
Switzerland (Schweizer Hitparade)	21
Ukraine Airplay (TopHit)	59
Uruguay (Monitor Latino)	2
US Billboard Hot 100	98
US Dance Club Songs (Billboard)	8
US Hot Latin Songs (Billboard)	8
US Latin Airplay (Billboard)	1
Venezuela (National-Report)	20

2024 Weekly chart performance for "El Baño"
Chart (2024)	Peak position
Estonia Airplay (TopHit)	96

=== Year-end charts ===
Chart (2018)	Position
Argentina (Monitor Latino)	11
Belgium (Ultratop Wallonia)	61
Hungary (Dance Top 40)	19
Hungary (Rádiós Top 40)	32
Portugal (AFP)	165
Slovenia (SloTop50)	33
Spain (PROMUSICAE)	27
US Hot Latin Songs (Billboard)	22
Chart (2019)	Position
Hungary (Dance Top 40)	54

== Certifications ==
Region	Certification	Certified units/sales
Canada (Music Canada)	Gold	40,000^{‡}
Italy (FIMI)	Gold	25,000^{‡}
Mexico (AMPROFON)	3× Platinum+Gold	210,000^{‡}
Poland (ZPAV)	Platinum	20,000^{‡}
Spain (Promusicae)	2× Platinum	80,000^{‡}
Switzerland (IFPI Switzerland)	Gold	10,000^{‡}
^{‡} Sales+streaming figures based on certification alone.

== See also ==
- List of number-one songs of 2018 (Mexico)
- List of Billboard number-one Latin songs of 2018
