= Pina Records =

Puerto Rican record label

- Parent company: Sony Music Latin Since 2008
- Founded: 1996; 30 years ago
- Founder: Rafael Antonio Pina Nieves
- Distributor: Sony Music Latin
- Genre: Reggaeton, trap
- Location: Caguas, Puerto Rico
- Official website: pinarecords.net

Pina Records (originally Pina Music) is a Puerto Rico-based record label founded by music producer Rafael "Raphy" Antonio Pina Nieves in 1996. Pina Records is one of the longest-running reggaetón record labels; in 2026, the label will celebrate its 30-year anniversary. One of the genre’s most successful labels, Pina Records' biggest artists include the likes of Daddy Yankee, Natti Natasha, Plan B and R.K.M & Ken-Y.

Pina records was one of the key companies in the globalization of reggaeton, following the moderately popular era of Maleanteo, they introduced one of the most influential players in the Reggaetón Romántico scene, when they signed and launched the widely popular duo RKM Y Ken Y (rapper and singer, respectively) in 2006. The duo released Masterpiece (Rakim y Ken-Y album), an album met with immense success. It added the idea of Romantic Reggaeton to the already popular singer-rapper combo that was sweeping the genre.

This catapulted the label into new highs throughout the 2010s (RKM y Ken Y, the initial duo that brought worldwide success to Raphy separated around this time) as Pina signed Daddy Yankee, Zion y Lennox, Tony Dize, Arcangel, and Natti Natasha (the only remaining signed member from this period). After the publication of La Fórmula (album) followed an era of success for the label, Plan B's Love & Sex (album), Arcangel's Sentimiento, Elegancia y Maldad, and the hit Hace Mucho Tiempo. Despite losing most of its signed artists after 2018, (probably in part owing to Pina's imprisonment and not being able to recruit as aggressively), it still retained relevancy through its star, Natti Natasha, and her collaborations Criminal (song), Sin Pijama, and her hit album Iluminatti.

Longstanding mainstays departed to launch independent or rival projects. Zion & Lennox left, Arcángel split after contractual disputes in 2019, and Plan B dissolved their duo around 2018–2019 as Chencho Corleone and Maldy pursued solo careers. Raphy Pina pivoted heavily into personal management, becoming Daddy Yankee’s primary business manager during the explosive Despacito and Dura (song) era, working alongside Yankee through his record-breaking farewell tour and album, Legendaddy (album) (2022).

On December 22, 2021, Rafael was convicted of firearms possession by a convicted Felon (money laundering & bank fraud from 2012), and sentenced to 2 years in Federal Prison, 3 years supervised release, and 150k in fines. Throughout this, Pina records remained under Pina's wife's control.

In the fiscal year of 2025 Daddy Yankee's company, El Cartel Records (defunct) filed RICO damages in the First Circuit Federal Court of Puerto Rico against Raphy Pina. He alleges that Pina falsified his coauthorship and thereby siphoned revenue away from the budding artist. He seeks millions in damages. (This is part of an ongoing accusation of both Raphy and Yankee's ex wife).

== Roster ==
- Natti Natasha (Though technically she does produce for Pina, her music is sold to Del Records in a handshake agreement.)

== Producers and composers ==
- DJ Eliel
- Myztiko
- Lobo
- Rooster JG (Retired from Industry)

== Affiliated artists and producers ==
- Haze
- Duran
- Mambo Kingz
- Tainy
- DJ Blass
- Luny Tunes
- DJ Luian
- Wise
- Ozuna

== Artists previously signed to the label ==
- R.K.M & Ken-Y (2004-2013) (2017-2020)
- Arcángel (2012-2019)
- Don Chezina (1996-2005)
- Daddy Yankee (2001-2023)
- Don Omar
- Héctor & Tito (2002) — single-album deal for The Godfather
- Lito & Polaco (1999-2007)
- Maicol & Manuel (2002-2004)
- Master Joe & O.G. Black (2000-2003)
- MC Ceja (2001-2003)
- Nicky Jam (2001-2008)
- Karel & Julio Voltio (2001-2003)
- Yaviah (2002 - 2009)
- Sir Speedy (2003-2005)
- Carlitos Way (2006-2009)
- Cruzito (2006-2010)
- Grupo Karis (2007)
- Ashanti Baeza (2008-2009)
- Zion & Lennox (2010-2013)
- Plan B (2008-2020)
- Maldy (2008-2017) — formerly of Plan B
- Chencho Corleone (2008-2020) — formerly of Plan B
- Jalil Lopez (2011-2013)
- El Sica (2016-2017) (retired from the industry)
- Tony Dize (2013-2015)
- Yaga y Mackie (2001)
- Jenay (2001-2003) - murdered in 2019
- DJ Blass (2001-2003)
- DJ Dicky (1999-2006)
- DJ Magic (1999-2006)

== Discography ==
- Bien Guillao de Gangster (Don Chezina) (1997)
- DJ Joe 6: Escuadrón del Pánico (1998)
- Masacrando MC's (Lito & Polaco) (1999)
- Éxitos Vol. 1 (Lito & Polaco) (2000)
- Francotiradores (Master Joe & O.G. Black) (2000)
- La Conspiración (2001)
- DJ Blass: Sandunguero (2001)
- Haciendo Escante (Nicky Jam) (2001)
- El Cartel II (Los Cangris: Daddy Yankee and Nicky Jam) (2001)
- Mundo Frío (Lito & Polaco) (2002)
- DJ Dicky: No Fear 4 - Sin Miedo (2002)
- Gavilan: Despertando Conciencia Vol. 2 (2002)
- Francotiradores Vol. 2 (Master Joe & O.G. Black) (2002)
- The Godfather (2002)
- Yakaleo (Maicol & Manuel) (2002)
- DJ Blass: Sandunguero Vol. 2 (2003)
- Dando Cocotazos (Sir Speedy) (2003)
- La Colección (Master Joe & O.G. Black) (2003)
- La Conspiración Vol. 2: La Secuela (2003)
- Pina All-Star (2003)
- Pina...The Company: Los Más Duros (2003)
- Mi Trayectoria (Don Chezina) (2004)
- DJ Dicky: No Fear Classics (2004)
- Fuera de Serie (Lito & Polaco) (2004)
- Pina All-Star Vol. 2 (2004)
- Vida Escante (Nicky Jam) (2004)
- Boricuas NY 2 (2004)
- Reggaeton's Best Features (2004)
- Da' Concert of Reggaeton (2005)
- Fuera de Serie Live (Lito & Polaco) (2005)
- Reggaeton Bachatero Non Stop (2005)
- Reggaeton's Best Features (2005)
- Vida Escante: Special Edition (Nicky Jam) (2005)
- Los Nenes del Blin Blin (Plan B) (2005)
- Reggaetion Street Mix (2005)
- Pina All Stars: The Dream Team (2005)
- Masterpiece (RKM & Ken-Y) (2006)
- Masterpiece: World Tour (Sold Out) (RKM & Ken-Y) (2006)
- Los Famosos del Reggaeton (2006)
- Masterpiece "Commemorative Edition" (RKM & Ken-Y) (2007)
- The Black Carpet (Nicky Jam) (2007)
- Los 4 Fantasticos (Karis) (2007)
- Interestatal 69: El Camino Al Placer (Plan B) (2007)
- Reggaeton de Markesina (Maldy Plan B) (2007)
- The Royalty: La Realeza (RKM & Ken-Y) (2008)
- La Melodía De La Calle: Updated (Tony Dize) (2009)
- The Last Chapter (RKM & Ken-Y) (2010)
- The Platinum Chronicles (Cruzito) (2010)
- House of Pleasure (Plan B) (2010)
- Los Verdaderos (Zion & Lennox) (2010)
- Forever (R.K.M & Ken-Y) (2011)
- La Fórmula (Zion & Lennox, Plan B, RKM & Ken-Y, Arcángel, Lobo & Jalil Lopez) (2012)
- Sentimiento, Elegancia & Maldad (Arcángel) (2013)
- Love & Sex (Plan B) (2014)
- La Melodia de la Calle, 3rd Season (Tony Dize) (2015)
- The Last Don 2 (Don Omar) (2015)
- Los Favoritos (Arcángel & DJ Luian) (2015)
- Ares (Arcángel) (2018)
- Iluminatti (Natti Natasha) (2019)
- Nattividad (Natti Natasha) (2021)
- Anubis (Fran Rozzano) (2023)

== DVDs ==
- Pina Records: Los Videos
- Los Vídeos del Reggaetón 2 (2003)
- La Conspiración DVD (2004)

== See also ==
- Machete Music
- List of record labels
