= Nattividad =

2021 studio album by Natti Natasha

Studio album by Natti Natasha
- Released: 24 September 2021
- Genre: Reggaeton, Latin pop
- Length: 65:13
- Language: Spanish
- Label: Pina Records, Sony Music Latin
- Producer: Rafael Pina

Natti Natasha chronology
Iluminatti (2019)	Nattividad (2021)	Nasty Singles (2023)

Singles from Nattividad
- 1. "Que Mal Te Fue (Remix)" Released: 8 October 2020; 2. "Antes Que Salga El Sol" Released: 15 January 2021; 3. "Las Nenas" Released: 4 March 2021; 4. "Ram Pam Pam" Released: 20 April 2021; 5. "Philliecito" Released: 21 July 2021; 6. "Noches En Miami" Released: 24 August 2021; 7. "Imposible Amor" Released: 23 September 2021; 8. "No Quiero Saber" Released: 28 October 2021; 9. "Fue Tu Culpa" Released: 18 November 2021; 10. "Arrebatá" Released: 9 December 2021

Nattividad is the second studio album by Dominican recording artist Natti Natasha, released on 24 September 2021, by Pina Records and Sony Music Latin.

== Track listing ==
Nattividad
No.	Title	Writer(s)	Producer(s)	Length
1.	"Frozen"	Juan G. Rivera Vázquez; Natalia Gutiérrez; Rafael Pina; Jaime Cosculluela; Carlos Vidal Mejias Negrin; Joel Ismael Vazquez Reyes	Came Beats; Gaby Music	3:40
2.	"Antes Que Salga El Sol" (with Prince Royce)	Juan Luis Londoño Arias; Edgar Barrera; Gutiérrez; Pina; Samuel Elliot Roman; Elena Rose	Romans; Edgar Barrera	3:05
3.	"Fue Tu Culpa" (with Fran Rozzano)	Barrera; Andrés Mauricio Acosta; Santiago Munera Penagos; Gutiérrez; Pina	Barrera; Golden Mindz	2:54
4.	"Arrebatá"	Gutiérrez; Geoffrey Rojas; Xavier Semper; Luian Malavé; Rafael A. Salcedo; Edgar Semper; Pablo C. Fuentes; Pina; Kedin Maysonet; Wander M. Méndez Santos; D'Lesly Lora; Yonathan Then; Ronald López	Mambo Kingz; DJ Luian; Neneto	2:40
5.	"Que Mal Te Fue"	José C. García; David A. Marcus; Andy Bauza; Juan G. Rivera Vazquez; Gutiérrez; Pina; Chauncey Lamont Hawkins; Mario Mendell Winans; Eithne Patricia Brennan; Michael Carlos Jones; Nicholas Dominick Ryan; Roma Shane Ryan; Eric Sermon; Parrish Joseff Smith	IAmChino; White Star; Gaby Music	3:33
6.	"Ram Pam Pam" (with Becky G)	Gutiérrez; Francisco Saldaña; Jean Carlos Hernández Espinal; Rebbeca Marie Gomez; Pina; Ovimael Maldonado Burgos; Ramón Luis Ayala Rodríguez; Nino Karlo Segarra; Justin Quiles; Siggy Vázquez; Elena Rose; Juan Manuel Frias; Valentina López	Luny; YannC; Raphy Pina	3:20
7.	"Hablando De Mi"	Gutiérrez; Jorge Valdés; Johnny Oscar Lopez Pimental; Julieta Cazzuchelli; Francisco Saldaña; Farina Pao Paucar Franco; Pina; Ovimael Maldonado Burgos; Zuleyka Marie Rodriguez; Ayala Rodríguez; Quiles	Dimelo Flow; BK; Luny; Pina	3:02
8.	"No Quiero Saber"	Gutiérrez; Jorge Valdés; Pina; Ayala Rodríguez; Quiles	Dímelo Flow	2:50
9.	"Noches En Miami"	Valdés; Gutiérrez; Pina; Ayala Rodríguez; Quiles; Lopez Pimental; Miguel Martinez	Dímelo Flow; Slow Mike; BK	2:35
10.	"Las Nenas" (with Cazzu and Farina and La Duraca)	Joel Ismael Vazquez Reyes; Carlos Vidal Mejias Negrin; Jaime Cosculluela; Raven Torres; Gutiérrez; Pina	Came Beats	3:45
11.	"Eleven"	Héctor Emmanuel Birriel Carballo; Francisco Saldaña; Maldonado Burgos; Francisco Rozano; Gutiérrez; Pina	Luny	3:13
12.	"Despacio" (with Manuel Turizo and Nicky Jam and Myke Towers)	Gutiérrez; Pina; Cristian Quitante Catalan; Antón Álvarez Alfaro; Nicolás Jaña; Alejandro Ramírez	Sky Rompiendo; Taiko	4:42
13.	"Me Felicitó"	Luis A Quiñones; Xavier Areizaga-Padilla; José A Hernández; Juan G. Rivera Vazquez; Maldonado Burgos; Gutiérrez; Pina	Xound Productor	3:22
14.	"Imposible Amor" (with Maluma)	Barrera; Carlos Martin; Bryan Snaider Lezcano; Kevin Mauricio Jiménez Londoño; Andrés Uribe Marín; Gutiérrez; Pina; Kevyn Mauricio Cruz; Brandon Anthony Parrott; Curtis James Jackson; Denaun Montez Porter	Barrera; RudeBoyz; Ily Wonder	2:54
15.	"Otro Mundo"	Gutiérrez; Pina; Ayala Rodríguez; Quiñones; Xavier Areizaga-Padilla; José A. Hernández; Jesús M. Benítez Hiraldo; Bryan García Quiñones	Xound Productor	2:56
17.	"Que Lio"	Barrera; Acosta; Ralph Van Hilst; Munera Penagos; Gutiérrez; Pina; Dimitri Thivaios; Michael Thivaios; Marlon Flohr		3:26
18.	"Me Estás Matando"	Carlos Braulio Mercader; Joseph Negron Vélez; Gutierrez; Pina; Maldondo Burgos	Alex Killer	2:58
19.	"Philliecito" (with Nio Garcia and Brray)	carlos Braulio Mercader; Joseph Negron Vélez; Gutierrez; Pina; Maldonado Burgos	Alex Killer	4:13
20.	"Cuento Breve"	Carlos Braulio Mercader; Joseph Negron Vélez; Gutierrez; Pina; Maldonado Burgos	Alex Killer	3:49
Total length:				65:13

== Charts ==
=== Weekly charts ===
Weekly chart performance for Nattividad
Chart (2021)	Peak position
Spanish Albums (Promusicae)	36
US Top Latin Albums (Billboard)	14
US Latin Rhythm Albums (Billboard)	11

=== Year-end charts ===
Year-end chart performance for Nattividad
Chart (2021)	Position
US Top Latin Albums (Billboard)	78

== Certifications ==
Certifications for Nattividad
Region	Certification	Certified units/sales
United States (RIAA)	Gold (Latin)	30,000^{‡}
^{‡} Sales+streaming figures based on certification alone.
