= Natti Natasha =

Dominican singer (born 1986)

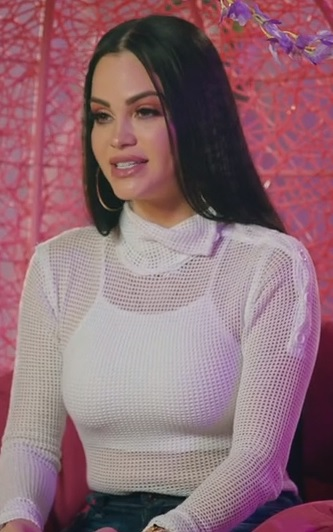
- Natti Natasha in 2019
- Born: Natalia Alexandra Gutiérrez Batista; 10 December 1986 (age 39); Santiago de los Caballeros, Dominican Republic
- Occupations: Singer; songwriter
- Years active: 2010–present
- Works: Discography
- Partner(s): Rafael Pina (2018–present; engaged)
- Children: 2
- Awards: Full list
- Musical career
- Genres: Reggaeton; Bachata
- Labels: Orfanato; Pina; Sony Latin
- Website: www.nattinatasha.com

Natalia Alexandra Gutiérrez Batista (born 10 December 1986), better known by her stage name Natti Natasha (stylized all caps), is a Dominican singer. She was signed to Don Omar's label Orfanato Music Group. Her debut EP, All About Me, was released on 28 March 2012, by Orfanato Music Group. Her debut album, Iluminatti, was released on 15 February 2019, by Pina Records and Sony Music Latin.

== Early life ==
Natalia Alexandra Gutiérrez Batista was born on 10 December 1986, in Santiago de los Caballeros, Dominican Republic where she started her involvement in music. When she was seven, Natasha registered at the school of Fine Arts in Santiago, where she took classes for singing and developed her singing abilities, which she has described as one of the best times in her life. From a very young age, she had admired artists such as Bob Marley and Jerry Rivera, and especially Lauryn Hill, whom she still names as one of her favourites. Natasha also expressed that she has followed and admired Ivy Queen since the beginning of Queen's career, with Queen responding via Twitter: "Thanks for the respect, admiration. That's having class and more than anything intelligence". When she was 18, she moved to the Bronx hoping to make it in the "City of Dreams". There, she met reggaeton veteran Don Omar who then signed her to his record label. She also was an engineer and worked at a Makeup factory.

At the age of 18, Natalia began to compose and record her own songs, performing different musical performances that took place in her native Santiago and together with her friends, she decided to form the musical group "D'Style", arriving to record some musical themes, the grouping did not achieve the expected results and eventually disintegrated. As a result, Natalia decides to put in a brief pause her short musical career.

As of 2022, Natasha has been a vegan for more than seven years.

== Career ==
=== 2010–2016: Career beginnings ===
Natasha was signed to Orfanato Music Group for a few songs, in 2010 released "Hold Ya (Remix)" with Gyptian and Don Omar. She was featured in a song by Don Omar, called "Dutty Love", recorded in 2011 and released in March 2012 and worked with Farruko on "Crazy in Love". The former's success led to another collaboration with Omar, "Tus Movimientos". Both songs are featured on Omar's album Don Omar Presents MTO²: New Generation, released in 2012.

=== 2017–2018: Breakthrough and collaborations ===
In 2017, Puerto Rican singer Daddy Yankee released the song "Otra Cosa" with Natasha. She released the single "Criminal", with Ozuna, which became an instant hit, reaching the top five of the Billboard Hot Latin Songs chart and being the most watched music video overall in 2017. In April 2018, Becky G released "Sin Pijama", a collaboration with Natasha. The song was Natasha's second global hit, peaking at number three on the Hot Latin Songs chart, being certified platinum within three weeks of release, and reaching one billion views in six months, being the most watched female song of the year. She has also collaborated with Bad Bunny, R.K.M & Ken-Y, Thalía, and Cosculluela. Natasha is currently signed to Pina Records.

=== 2019–present: Iluminatti, Nattividad and further collaborations ===
She released her debut album, Iluminatti on 15 February 2019, by Pina Records and Sony Music Latin. The album has a total of 15 songs, with two of them being features, "Te Lo Dije" with Anitta and "Soy Mía" with Kany Garcia. In 2019, she collaborated with Daddy Yankee, the Jonas Brothers and Sebastián Yatra on "Runaway". On 24 September 2021, at Billboard’s 2021 Latin Music Week, Natasha returned to the stage for the first time in two years, performing a medley of her hit songs.

Her six-episode docuseries Everybody Loves Natti premiered on 19 November 2021.

On 13 January 2022, Natasha collaborated with South Korean girl group Momoland on the song "Yummy Yummy Love", marking her return to singing in English since her debut EP and her first time collaborating with an Asian act.

== Personal life ==
In 2021, she became engaged to her longtime manager, Rafael Pina, founder of Pina Records. On 18 February 2021, she announced that she was pregnant with Pina's child. On 22 May 2021, she gave birth to their daughter, Vida Isabelle Pina Gutiérrez. On 11 June 2025, she announced that she and Pina expecting their second child together. On 1 November 2025, she gave birth to another daughter, Dominique Isabelle.

== Discography ==
- Iluminatti (2019)
- Nattividad (2021)
- Nasty Singles (2023)
- Natti Natasha en Amargue (2025)

== Tours ==
- Natti Natasha Europe Tour (2018)
- Iluminatti Tour (2019)
- Nattividad Tour (2022)
