= List of songs recorded by Becky G =

Gomez in 2022.

Becky G is an American singer and songwriter. In 2011-2012, she first gained recognition when she began posting videos of herself covering popular songs online. Gomez has established herself as a versatile powerhouse in the music industry. In 2012, she signed a record deals with Kemosabe and RCA Records, and she later released her debut hip-hop single "Becky from the Block". Gomez released her debut extended play titled Play It Again on July 13, 2013. The EP is a pop and pop rap record. After initially achieving mainstream success in English-language pop and hip-hop with her hit "Shower" (2014).

In 2016, Gomez decided to move to Spanish music, changing the course in her music career to the Latin music market. Her debut studio album, Mala Santa was released on October 17, 2019. Mala Santa is primarily a latin pop and reggaeton record with urbano elements. The album centers around the themes of female empowerment, dual identities, and reclaiming control in relationships. Her second studio album, Esquemas was released on May 13, 2022. The album blended latin pop and dance-pop with reggaeton and R&B elements. Lyrically, the album explores themes of breaking down societal expectations, emotional vulnerability, self-acceptance, and autonomy.

Her third and fourth studio albums, Esquinas (2023), and Encuentros (2024), which both is a regional Mexican record. Esquinas incorporates elements of corridos tumbados, mariachi and ranchera. The album is a deeply personal, explores maturity, identity, family heritage, and heartbreak. Encuentros blends corridos tumbados with ranchera and sierreño elements. The album is a deeply personal celebration of Mexican-American identity, emotional healing, and cultural heritage. The albums is a tribute to her grandparents, who emigrated from Mexico to the US. Her fifth studio album, Baraja Bendita was released on August 14, 2026. The album blends pop, latin music and rap styles with dance-pop and reggaeton elements. Lyrically, the album explores themes of dual identity, cultural roots, and personal evolution through a mix of Spanish and English.

== Songs ==
Key
†	Indicates single release

Name of song, featured performers, writers, album, and year released.
Title	Artist(s)	Writer(s)	Album(s)	Year	Ref.
"24/7"	Becky G	Daniel Ignacio Rondón; Edgar Semper; Hector Enrique Ramos Carbia; Kedin Maysonet; Luian Malavé Nieves; Nathaniel Campany; Pablo C. Fuentes; Patrick A. Ingunza; Rafael Rodríguez; Rebbeca Marie Gomez; Xavier Semper	Mala Santa	2019	
"2AM"	Becky G	Dylan Hyde; František Šulc; Jamil M. Pierre; John Stephen Sudduth; Nathaniel Campany; Rebbeca Marie Gomez; Sara Schell; Shah Major; Sharif Slater	Baraja Bendita	2026	
"2ndo Chance" †	Becky G and Iván Cornejo	Alejandro Luna Casas; Édgar Barrera; Francisco Ríos; Héctor André Mazzarri Ramos; Iván Cornejo; Luis Miguel Gómez Castaño; Manuel Lorente Freire; Rebbeca Marie Gomez	Esquinas	2023	
"5'5"	Becky G	Kyle Shearer; Sara Schell; Rachel Keen; Rebbeca Marie Gomez	Baraja Bendita	2026	
"Ai Se Eu Te Pego"	Michel Teló featuring Becky G	Aline da Fonseca; Amanda Teixeira; Antônio Dyggs; Karine Assis Vinagre; Rebbeca Marie Gomez; Sharon Acioly	Ai Se Eu Te Pego EP	2012	
"Amantes" †	Becky G and Daviles de Novelda	Alberto Mora Amigo; David Muñumel Garoña; Edgardo Noé Chavez Paz; Francisco José Vargas Gabarri; Jorge Ángel Calvet Díaz; Juan Nicolas Mayorca Escobar; Manuel David Fernandez Molina; Manuel Lorente Freire; Rebbeca Marie Gomez	—N/a	2022	
"Amigos" †	Bibi and Becky G	Andrea Elena Mangiamarchi; Hyoungseo Kim; Nathaniel Campany; Rafael Rodríguez; Rebbeca Marie Gomez	—N/a	2023	
"Arranca" †	Becky G featuring Omega	Alexander Castillo Vasquez; Andrea Elena Mangiamarchi; Antonio Peter De la Rosa; Daniel Ignacio Rondón; Henry Durham; Manuel Lorente Freire; Rafael Rodríguez; Rebbeca Marie Gomez	—N/a	2023	
"Los Astros"	Becky G	Édgar Barrera; Felix Manuel Rodriquez; Kevyn Mauricio Cruz Moreno; Luis Miguel Gómez Castaño; Manuel Lorente Freire	Esquinas	2023	
"Automático"	Becky G	Alex Goldblatt; Jamil M. Pierre; Nathaniel Campany; Rebbeca Marie Gomez; Sara Schell	Baraja Bendita	2026	
"Baila Así" †	Play-N-Skillz, Thalía and Becky G featuring Chiquis	Ariadna Thalía Sodi Miranda; David Alberto Macias; Emmanuel Anene; Gary Walker Jr. Janney Marin; Jose Manuel Del Rosario Rodriguez; Juan Salinas; Oscar Salinas; Rebbeca Marie Gomez; Rodolfo Olivares; Steven Maximo Cespedes	—N/a	2021	
"Bailé Con Mi Ex" †	Becky G	Andrew Jackson; Blake Slatkin; Gregory Hein; Héctor André Mazzarri Ramos; Keegan Bach; Manuel Lorente Freire; Mario Cáceres; Rebbeca Marie Gomez	Esquemas	2022	
"Banana" †	Anitta featuring Becky G	Dwayne Chin-Quee; Ender Thomas; Marco Masís; Mario Cáceres; Sam; Sean; Theron Thomas	Kisses	2019	
"Bandera Blanca"	Becky G	Carlos A. Molina; Daniel Ignacio Rondón; Elvin Jesus Roubert-Rodriguez; Manuel Lorente Freire; Rebbeca Marie Gomez; Sara Schell	Baraja Bendita	2026	
"Bandido"	Becky G	Hector Guerrero; Justus West; Rebbeca Marie Gomez; Sara Schell	Encuentros	2024	
"Becky from the Block" †	Becky G	Andre Deyo; David Styles; Fernando Arbex; Henry Russell Walter; Jason Phillips; Jean Olivier; Jennifer Lopez; Jordan Omley; Lawrence Parker; Łukasz Gottwald; Michael Oliver; Rebbeca Marie Gomez; Samuel Barnes; Scott Sterling; Troy Oliver	—N/a	2013	
"Bella Ciao" †	Becky G	Traditional	—N/a	2021	
"Besándote"	Becky G featuring Oscar Ortiz	Hector Guerrero; Rebbeca Marie Gomez; Sara Schell	Encuentros	2024	
"Bien Canijo"	Becky G	Andrea Elena Mangiamarchi; Édgar Barrera; Luis Miguel Gómez Castaño; Rebbeca Marie Gomez	Esquinas	2023	
"Bluetooth" †	Mariachi Divas and Becky G	Adrián Pieragostino; Cindy Shea; Hector Guerrera; Rebbeca Marie Gomez	25 Aniversario	2024	
"Boomerang"	Becky G	Dylan Brady; Manuel Lorente Freire; Nathaniel Campany; Sara Schell; Sol Was	—N/a	2024	
"Booty" †	C. Tangana and Becky G	Antón Álvarez Alfaro; Bruno Valverde; Cristian Quirante Catalán; Daniel Cala Bernardez; Hajar Sbihi; Manuel Fernández; Rebbeca Marie Gomez	—N/a	2018	
"Borracha"	Becky G	Andrea Elena Mangiamarchi; Dwayne Chin-Quee; Rebbeca Marie Gomez; Stephanie Lavergne Torres; Valentina López	Esquemas	2022	
"Boys Ain't Shit" (Estos Chicos No Lo Son Remix)	Saygrace featuring Becky G	Andrea Elena Mangiamarchi; Britten Newbill; Grace Sewell; Rebbeca Marie Gomez; Ryan Williamson; Sam Fischer	—N/a	2020	
"Break a Sweat" †	Becky G	Chloe Angelides; Emily Warren; Gamal Lewis; Henry Russell Walter; Jacob Kasher Hindlin; Łukasz Gottwald	—N/a	2015	
"Bubalu" †	DJ Luian and Mambo Kingz featuring Anuel AA, Prince Royce and Becky G	Edgar Semper; Elvin Peña; Emmanuel Gazmey Santiago; Geoffrey Royce Rojas; Hector Enrique Ramos Carbia; Henry Pulman; Kedin Maysonet; Luian Malavé Nieves; Rebbeca Marie Gomez; Xavier Semper	—N/a	2018	
"Buen Dia" (Note: "Buen Dia" samples "That Lady" by The Isley Brothers.)	Becky G	Christopher Jasper; Ernie Isley; Manuel Lorente Freire; Marvin Isley; O'Kelly Isley Jr. Rebbeca Marie Gomez; Ronald Isley; Rudolph Isley; Skylar Mones	Esquemas	2022	
"Built for This"	Becky G	Henry Russell Walter; Łukasz Gottwald; Niles Hollowell-Dhar; Rebbeca Marie Gomez	Play It Again	2013	
"Candy Gum" †	Emotional Oranges featuring Jessie Reyez and Becky G	Azad Naficy; Jessica Reyez; Nathaniel Campany; Rebbeca Marie Gomez; Sara Schell; Yonatan Ayal	Orenjii	2025	
"Can't Get Enough" †	Becky G featuring Pitbull	Armando Christian Pérez; Gregor Van Offeren; Henry Russell Walter; Łukasz Gottwald; Max Martin; Niles Hollowell-Dhar; Rebbeca Marie Gomez; Tzvetin Todorov; Urales Vargas	Play It Again	2013	
"Can't Stop Dancin'" (Note: A remix featuring J Balvin was released in March 2015.) †	Becky G	Alexander Castillo Vasquez; Henry Russell Walter; Łukasz Gottwald; Rebecca Marie Gomez; Theron Thomas	—N/a	2014	
"Chanel" †	Becky G and Peso Pluma	Édgar Barrera; Hassan Laija; Jesús Roberto Laija García; Rebbeca Marie Gomez	Esquinas	2023	
"Chicken Noodle Soup" (Note: "Chicken Noodle Soup" samples "Chicken Noodle Soup" by DJ Webstar and Young B.) †	J-Hope featuring Becky G	Anthony Glover; Bianca Dupree; Desmond Ryan; Han Joo Hyun; Jung Ho-seok; Juan Manuel Frias; Kang Hyo-won; Park Soo-hyun; Rebbeca Marie Gomez; Shin Donghyuk	—N/a	2019	
"Christmas C'mon"	Lindsey Stirling featuring Becky G	Autumn Rowe; Jon levine Lindsey Stirling	Warmer in the Winter	2017	
"Chula"	Becky G	Daniel Ignacio Rondón; Elvin Jesus Roubert-Rodriguez; Manuel Lorente Freire; Rebbeca Marie Gomez; Sara Schell	Baraja Bendita	2026	
"Clouds"	Kshmr and Dillon Francis featuring Becky G	Dillon Francis; Niles Hollowell-Dhar; Rebbeca Marie Gomez	—N/a	2015	
"Cntrl"	Becky G	Jamil M. Pierre; Nathaniel Campany; Rebbeca Marie Gomez; Sara Schell	Baraja Bendita	2026	
"Coming Your Way" †	Michaël Brun, Anne-Marie and Becky G	Anne-Marie Rose Nicholson; Manuel Lorente Freire; Patrick Michael Brun; Rebbeca Marie Gomez; Tia Scola	Fami Vol. 1	2023	
"Como Diablos" †	Becky G	Hector Guerrera; Rebbeca Marie Gomez; Sara Schell	Encuentros	2024	
"Cómo No" †	Akon featuring Becky G	Aliaune Thiam; Camilo Echeverry; Carlos Peralta; Jonathan Leone; Mauricio Reglero Rodríguez; Ricardo Reglero Rodríguez	El Negreeto	2019	
"Como Tú No Hay Dos" †	Thalía featuring Becky G	Alfredo Matheus; Andy Clay; Henry Russell Walter; Łukasz Gottwald; Rassel Marcano; Rebbeca Marie Gomez; Theron Thomas	Amore Mio	2014	
"Cough" †	Kizz Daniel and Becky G	Marcel Larry Akunwata; Maurice Simmonds; Oluwatobiloba Anidugbe; Philip Ahaiwe Chukwuja; Skylar Mones	Maverick	2023	
"Cries in Spanish"	Becky G and DannyLux	Alejandro Luna Casas; Andrea Elena Mangiamarchi; Daniel Balderrama Espinoza; Édgar Barrera; Héctor André Mazzarri Ramos; Luis Miguel Gómez Castaño; Rebbeca Marie Gomez	Esquinas	2023	
"Crisis"	Becky G and Tito Double P	Jesús Roberto Laija García; Rebbeca Marie Gomez; Sara Schell	Encuentros	2024	
"Cruz de Olvido"	Becky G	Juan Záizar	Esquinas	2023	
"Cuando Te Besé" †	Becky G and Paulo Londra	Cristian Andrés Salazar; Daniel Echavarría Oviedo; Paulo Ezequiel Londra	Mala Santa	2018	
"Cuidadito"	Becky G and Chiquis	Édgar Barrera; Jesús Omar Tarazón Medina; Juan Pablo Zazueta Acosta; Rebbeca Marie Gomez	Esquinas	2023	
"La Curiosidad" (Red Grand Prix Remix)	Jay Wheeler, Myke Towers and Becky G featuring DJ Nelson, Arcángel, Zion & Lennox, De la Ghetto and Brray	Austin Agustín Santos; Bryan García Quinones; Emmanuel Infante; Félix Ortiz; Gabriel Pizarro; Hector Javier Cordero Ortiz; José López Martínez; Kevin Omar Ortiz Bones; Kristian Ginorio; Michael Torres Monge; Nelson Díaz Martinez; Rafael Castillo Torres; Rebbeca Marie Gomez	—N/a	2020	
"Desierto"	Becky G	Hector Guerrero; Rebbeca Marie Gomez; Sara Schell	Encuentros	2024	
"Die Young" (Remix) †	Kesha featuring Juicy J, Wiz Khalifa and Becky G	Benjamin Levin; Henry Russell Walter; Kesha Sebert; Łukasz Gottwald; Nate Ruess	Warrior	2012	
"Díganle" (Note: A remix with CNCO was released in August 2018.) †	Leslie Grace and Becky G	Alejandro Montaner; César Román; Frank Santofimio; Leslie Grace Martínez; Marco Masís; Rebbeca Marie Gomez	—N/a	2017	
"Do It"	Empire cast featuring Becky G and Raquel Castro	Christopher J. Baran; Jonathan Rotem; Ruth Anne Cunningham	Empire	2015	
"Dodger Blue" (Note: This song surfaced in 2015 and Gomez posted the official studio version on her YouTube channel in 2017.)	Becky G	Jordan Omley; Michael Mani; Rebbeca Marie Gomez	—N/a	2015	
"Dollar" †	Becky G and Myke Towers	Andrea Elena Mangiamarchi; Daniel Ignacio Rondón; Edgar Semper; Hector Enrique Ramos Carbia; Jose M. Reyes Diaz; Luian Malavé Nieves; Michael Torres Monge; Nathaniel Campany; Orlando J. Cepeda Matos; Rafael Rodríguez; Rebbeca Marie Gomez; Xavier Semper	Mala Santa	2019	
"Dolores"	Becky G	Andrea Elena Mangiamarchi; Dwayne Chin-Quee; Rebbeca Marie Gomez; Stephanie Lavergne Torres; Valentina López	Esquemas	2022	
"Don't Go" †	DJ Vice featuring Becky G and Mr Eazi	David Johnston; Eric Aguirre; James Doman; Joseph Rosiji Griffith; Okan; Sermstyle; Tiago Ribeiro	—N/a	2018	
"Down to Miami" †	Emotional Oranges featuring Becky G	Azad Naficy; Juan Manuel Frias; Mitch Bell; Montore Fermin Victor Jesus; Rebecca Marie Gomez; Valentina Porter	Juicebox	2021	
"La Ducha" (Remix)	Elena Rose, María Becerra and Greeicy featuring Becky G and Tini	Andrea Elena Mangiamarchi; Daniel Ignacio Rondón; Greeicy Yeliana Rendon Ceballos; Henry Russell Walter; Łukasz Gottwald; María de los Ángeles Becerra; Martina Stoessel; Rafael Rodríguez; Rebbeca Marie Gomez; Theron Thomas; Timothy Thomas	—N/a	2022	
"Dum Dum"	Kideko, Tinie Tempah and Becky G	Camille Purcell; Ryan Hurley; Tim Powell	—N/a	2017	
"Dumebi" (Remix)	Rema and Becky G	Andrea Elena Mangiamarchi; Divine Ikubor; Igbinoba Osazee; Patrick A. Ingunza; Rebbeca Marie Gomez	—N/a	2020	
"Dura" (Remix)	Daddy Yankee featuring Natti Natasha, Becky G and Bad Bunny	Benito Antonio Martínez; Juan Gabriel Rivera; Luis Jorge Romero; Ramón Luis Ayala; Urbani Mota Cedeño	—N/a	2018	
"Duro Hard"	Black Eyed Peas and Becky G	Akil King; Damien LeRoy; Elof Loelv; Jimmy Luis Gomez; Juan Manuel Frias; Maurice Simmonds; Rebbeca Marie Gomez; Reynard Bargmann; Tiago da Cal Alves; William Adams; Yonatan Goldstein	Translation	2020	
"En Mi Contra"	Becky G	Edgar Semper; Kedin Maysonet; Luian Malavé Nieves; Pablo C. Fuentes; Rebbeca Marie Gomez; Xavier Semper	Mala Santa	2019	
"Epa" †	Becky G	Jamil M. Pierre; Kirsten Allyssa Spencer; Nathaniel Campany; Rebbeca Marie Gomez; Sara Schell	Baraja Bendita	2026	
"Excuse My Rude"	Jessie J featuring Becky G	Ammar Malik; Henry Russell Walter; Jessica Cornish; Łukasz Gottwald; Niles Hollowell-Dhar; Rebbeca Marie Gomez	Alive	2013	
"F Is For Friends"	Trevor Daniel, Tainy and Becky G	Abraham Olaleye; Alejandro Borrero; Alexis Idarose Kesselman; Ivanni Rodríguez; Jorge Luis Perez, Jr. Rebecca Marie Gomez; Trevor Daniel	The SpongeBob Movie: Sponge on the Run	2020	
"Factos"	Becky G	Daniel Ignacio Rondón; Héctor André Mazzarri Ramos; Jorge Milliano; Manuel Lorente Freire; Rebbeca Marie Gomez	Baraja Bendita	2026	
"The Fire Inside"	Becky G	Diane Warren	Flamin' Hot	2023	
"Flashback"	Becky G featuring Elena Rose	Andrea Elena Mangiamarchi; Manuel Lorente Freire; Rebbeca Marie Gomez; Stephen McGregor	Esquemas	2022	
"Flores Pa Ti"	Becky G, Luísa Sonza and Papatinho	Akil King; Carolina Marcilio; Gabriel Morant Lopes de Souza; Rebbeca Marie Gomez; Sara Schell; Tiago da Cal Alves	Bad Boys: Ride or Die	2024	
"For the Trill"	Yellow Claw featuring Becky G	David Quinones; Jim Taihuttu; Leo Roelandschap; Max Oude Weernink; Nils Rondhuis; Rebbeca Marie Gomez; Rosina Rusell	Blood for Mercy	2015	
"For Once in My Life"	Becky G	Orlando Murden; Ron Miller	Motown Magic	2018	
"Fulanito" †	Becky G and El Alfa	Alexander Castillo Vasquez; Andrea Elena Mangiamarchi; Emanuel Herrera Batista; Kyle Shearer; Nathaniel Campany; Rafael Rodríguez; Rebbeca Marie Gomez	Esquemas	2021	
"Giants" †	True Damage featuring Becky G, Keke Palmer, Soyeon, Duckwrth and Thutmose	Harloe; Jared Lee; Jessia Karpov; Kole Hicks; Umar Ibrahim	—N/a	2019	
"Glitch"	Becky G	Akil King; Christopher Wray; Jamil M. Pierre; Kirsten Allyssa Spencer; Rebbeca Marie Gomez; Sara Schell	Baraja Bendita	2026	
"GomezX4"	Becky G	Hector Guerrero; Rebbeca Marie Gomez; Sara Schell	Encuentros	2024	
"Green Light Go" †	Becky G	Ashante Reid; Dwayne Chin-Quee; Gabriel Blizman; John P Shullman; Theron Thomas	—N/a	2019	
"Guapa"	Becky G	Andrea Elena Mangiamarchi; Dwayne Chin-Quee; Manuel Lorente Freire; Rebbeca Marie Gomez; Valentina López	Esquemas	2022	
"Hablamos Mañana"	Becky G	Andrea Elena Mangiamarchi; Manuel Lorente Freire; Nathaniel Campany; Stephen McGregor	—N/a	2025	
"Hard Way"	Bia featuring Becky G	Akil King; Bianca Landrau; David Maximillian Cunningham; Enoch Richard Harris III; Jaucquez Lowe; Jerry Rivera; Kash Johns; Kevin Andre Price; Maurice Simmonds; Omar Alfanno; Rebecca Marie Gomez	Bianca	2025	
"Hora de Brillar (Time to Shine)"	Becky G and Dos Puentes Elementary	—N/a	—N/a	2026	
"I Ain't Worried" (Latin Version)	OneRepublic featuring Becky G	Andrea Elena Mangiamarchi; Björn Yttling; Brent Kutzle; Héctor André Mazzarri Ramos; John Eriksson; Manuel Lorente Freire; Peter Morén; Rebbeca Marie Gomez; Ryan Tedder; Tyler Spry	—N/a	2023	
"Jolene" †	Chiquis and Becky G	Dolly Parton	Playlist	2020	
"Kill Bill"	Becky G	Andrea Elena Mangiamarchi; Dwayne Chin-Quee; Rebbeca Marie Gomez; Stephanie Lavergne Torres; Valentina López	Esquemas	2022	
"Latina" (Remix)	Reykon, Maluma, Tyga and Becky G	Alvaro Enrique Farias Cabrera; Andrés Felipe Robledo Londoño; David Muñoz; Gil Corber; Gustavo López; Jerickson Jesus M Juan Luis Londoño Arias; Mauricio Rojas Agudelo; Michael Ray Nguyen-Stevenson; Rebbeca Marie Gomez; Rodrigo Rolando Mata Marrón; Sebastian Sanchez	—N/a	2020	
"LBD" †	Becky G	Alejandra Alberti; Dwayne Chin-Quee; Gabriel Blizman; John P Shullman; Theron Thomas	—N/a	2019	
"Lemonade" (Remix)	Aespa featuring Becky G	Cyrus Villanueva; Ellie Suh; Jordan Shaw; Kirsten Allyssa Spencer; Lewis Jankel; Sara Schell; Taylor Upsahl	Lemonade	2026	
"Lo Que Yo Diga"	Becky G	Alejandro Reyes; Carolina Isabel Colón Juarbe; Claudia Prieto; Mitchie Rivera; Natalia Hernández; Nicolás De la Espriella	Koati	2021	
"Lost in the Middle of Nowhere" (Note: A Spanish version of the song was released in March 2019.) †	Kane Brown featuring Becky G	Jesse Frasure; Jon Nite; Kane Brown; Lauren Alaina; Mario Cáceres (Note: Credited as the songwriter on the remix version.)	Experiment	2018	
"La Loto" †	Tini, Becky G and Anitta	Andrea Elena Mangiamarchi; Andrés Torres; Larissa de Macedo Machado; Martina Stoessel; Mauricio Rengifo; Rebbeca Marie Gomez	Cupido	2022	
"Lovin' So Hard" †	Becky G	Ester Dean; Henry Russell Walter; Jeremy Coleman; Łukasz Gottwald; Niles Hollowell-Dhar; Rebecca Marie Gomez; Rick Witherspoon Jr.	—N/a	2015	
"Lovin' What You Do"	Becky G	Henry Russell Walter; Jordan Omley; Łukasz Gottwald; Michael Mani; Rebbeca Marie Gomez	Play It Again	2013	
"Mad Love" †	Sean Paul and David Guetta featuring Becky G	Emily Warren; Giorgio Tuinfort; Ina Wroldsen; Jack Patterson; Pierre David Guetta; Raoul Chen; Rosina Russell; Sean Paul Henriques; Shakira Isabel Mebarak Ripoll	Mad Love the Prequel and 7 (Note: This song only appears on the Limited edition bonus tracks of 7.)	2018	
"Magik 2.0"	Becky G featuring Austin Mahone	Alexander Castillo Vasquez; Bobby Ray Simmons Jr. Łukasz Gottwald; Rebbeca Marie Gomez; Rivers Cuomo	The Smurfs 2	2013	
"Make It Count"	Becky G, Yeonjun and Myke Towers	Abner Cordero Boria; Alberto Carlos Melendez; Ana Mancebo; Choi Yeon-jun; Essa Gante; Jorge Luis Perez, Jr. Michael Torres Monge; Rebbeca Marie Gomez	2026 World Baseball Classic	2026	
"Mal de Amores" †	Sofía Reyes and Becky G	Andrea Elena Mangiamarchi; Andrés Torres; Mauricio Rengifo; Rebbeca Marie Gomez; Sofía Reyes Piñeyro	Mal de Amores	2021	
"Mal de la Cabeza"	Mau y Ricky and Becky G	Camilo Echeverry; Jesús Herrera; Jonathan Leone; Mauricio Reglero Rodríguez; Rebbeca Marie Gomez; Ricardo Reglero Rodríguez	Para Aventuras y Curiosidades	2018	
"Mal Tiempo"	Becky G	David Biral; Denzel Baptiste; Martin Rodriguez Vincente; Mel DeBarge; Nathaniel Campany; Polo Parra; Rebbeca Marie Gomez; Sara Schell	Baraja Bendita	2026	
"Mala" (Note: A remix with De la Ghetto was released in July 2020.)	Pitbull and Becky G	Achraf Jannusi; Andrew O'Neil Thomas; Armando Christian Pérez; Bilal Hajji; Dean Mundy; Jimmy Thörnfeldt; Jorge Gomez Martinez; José Carlos García; Miguel Ángel Durán Jr. Moses Anthony Davis; Rebbeca Marie Gomez	Libertad 548	2019	
"Mala Mía" (Remix)	Maluma, Becky G and Anitta	Bryan Lezcano Chaverra; Édgar Barrera; Johany Alejandro Correa; Juan Luis Londoño Arias; Kevin Mauricio Jiménez Londoño; Servando Primera; Stiven Rojas	—N/a	2018	
"Mala Santa" †	Becky G	Edgar Semper; Kedin Maysonet; Luian Malavé Nieves; Pablo C. Fuentes; Rebbeca Marie Gomez; Xavier Semper	Mala Santa	2019	
"Mamiii" †	Becky G and Karol G	Andrea Elena Mangiamarchi; Carolina Giraldo Navarro; Daniel Echavarría Oviedo; Daniel Uribe; Justin Rafael Quiles; Luis Miguel Gómez Castaño; Rebbeca Marie Gomez	Esquemas	2022	
"Mangú" †	Becky G	Alexander Castillo Vasquez; Martin Rodriguez Vincente; Rebbeca Marie Gomez; Steven Dominguez	—N/a	2016	
"Marathon" (Note: Elkan provided uncredited vocals for "Marathon".) †	Becky G	Kavin Smith; Paul Omar Elkan Agyei; Rebbeca Marie Gomez; Sara Schell; Sian Imani Hannah Emeh	Baraja Bendita	2026	
"Mayores" (Note: She released two versions: the first Urban Tropical was released in September 2017, and the second a remix featuring Lucas Lucco was released in June 2018.) †	Becky G and Bad Bunny	Alexander Castillo Vasquez; Benito Antonio Martínez; Jorge Fonseca; Mario Cáceres; Patrick A. Ingunza; Servando Moriche Primera Mussett	Mala Santa	2017	
"Me Acostumbré"	Becky G and Mau y Ricky	Camilo Echeverry; Édgar Barrera; Edgar Semper; Hector Enrique Ramos Carbia; Jonathan Leone; Kedin Maysonet; Luian Malavé Nieves; Mauricio Reglero Rodríguez; Rebbeca Marie Gomez; Ricardo Reglero Rodríguez; Xavier Semper	Mala Santa	2019	
"Mejor Así"	Becky G and Darell	Andrea Elena Mangiamarchi; Édgar Barrera; Edgar Semper; Hector Enrique Ramos Carbia; José Alberto Roble Ramírez; Juan Manuel Frias; Luian Malavé Nieves; Osvaldo Elías Castro Hernández; Rebbeca Marie Gomez; Xavier Semper	Mala Santa	2019	
"Mercedes" †	Becky G and Óscar Maydon	Hector Guerrero; Rebbeca Marie Gomez; Sara Schell	Encuentros	2024	
"Mi Gran Amor" †	Santana and Becky G	Carlos Santana; Daniel Ignacio Rondón; Édgar Barrera; Luis Miguel Gómez Castaño; Manuel Lorente Freire; Rebbeca Marie Gomez	TBA	2026	
"Mi Mala" (Remix) †	Mau y Ricky and Karol G featuring Becky G, Leslie Grace and Lali	Camilo Echeverry; Carolina Giraldo Navarro; Jonathan Leone; Marco Masís; Mauricio Reglero Rodríguez; Max Matluck; Ricardo Reglero Rodríguez	Para Aventuras y Curiosidades	2018	
"Muchacha" †	Gente de Zona and Becky G	Alejandro Arce; Ángel Alberto Arce; Andrea Elena Mangiamarchi; Alexander Delgado; Daniel Joel Márquez Díaz; Juan Morelli; Luis Eduardo Cedeño Konig; Paul Irizarry Suau; Randy Malcom; Roque Alberto Cedeño Konig; Yasmil Jesús Marrufo	De Menor a Mayor	2020	
"Muchas Gracias"	Becky G	Hector Guerrero; Rebbeca Marie Gomez; Sara Schell	Encuentros	2024	
"Mucho Mucho Muchooo"	Becky G	Rebbeca Marie Gomez	Encuentros	2024	
"Mueve"	Gianluca Vacchi, Nacho and Becky G featuring MC Fioti	Alessandro Francesco Merli; Fabio Clement; Gianluca Vacchi; Leandro Aparecido Ferreira; Miguel Ignacio Mendoza Donatti; René Cano Ríos; Rebbeca Marie Gomez	—N/a	2019	
"Un Mundo Ideal" (Versión Créditos)	Zayn and Becky G	Alan Menken; Tim Rice	Aladdin	2019	
"My Man" †	Becky G	Akil King; Andrea Elena Mangiamarchi; Édgar Barrera; Janée Bennett; Jenni Rivera; Maurice Simmonds; Rebbeca Marie Gomez; Stephen McGregor	—N/a	2020	
"My Type" (Latin Remix)	Saweetie featuring Becky G and Melii	Aleicia Gibson; Audrey Grinell Ducasse; Corey Evans; Craig Love; Diamonté Harper; Donny Flores; Gino Borri; Jonathan Smith; Lamarquis Jefferson; London Holmes; Moses Barrett III; Quavious Marshall; Rebbeca Marie Gomez	—N/a	2019	
"La Nena" †	Becky G and Gabito Ballesteros	Daniel Candia; Édgar Barrera; Gabriel Ballesteros Abril; Rebbeca Marie Gomez	Esquinas	2023	
"Next to You" (Note: A remix featuring Davido was released in May 2019.) †	Becky G, Digital Farm Animals and Rvssian	Chloe Latimer; Edgar Semper; Luian Malavé Nieves; Marío Dunwell; Nick Gale; Pablo C. Fuentes; Philip Kembo; Richard McClashie; Tarik Johnston; Xavier Semper	—N/a	2019	
"New New"	Empire cast featuring Becky G	Christopher J. Baran; Darius Coleman; Dwayne Murchison	Empire	2015	
"Ni De Ti Ni De Nadie" (Note: "Ni De Ti Ni De Nadie" samples "Turn Me On" by Kevin Lyttle.)	Becky G	Arnold Hennings; Courtney Sills; Daron Jones; Edgar Semper; Hector Enrique Ramos Carbia; Julian Maya Yepes; Juan Luis Cardona; Juan Manuel Frias; Kevin Lyttle; Luian Malavé Nieves; Marvin Scandrick; Michael Keith; Michael Sanchez; Quinnes Parker; Raeon Primus; Rebbeca Marie Gomez; Ronny Jhoan Frias; Xavier Semper	Mala Santa	2019	
"No Creo en el Amor"	Danny Romero featuring Santo and Becky G	Martin Rodriguez Vicente; Rebbeca Marie Gomez; Rommel Luis Cruz Sanchez; Santiago Cozzano Garcia; Steven Dominguez Carmona	11:11	2017	
"No Drama" (Note: A cumbia version of the song was released in March 2021.) †	Becky G and Ozuna	Andrea Elena Mangiamarchi; Edgar Semper; Elof Loelv; Evan Bogart; Hector Enrique Ramos Carbia; Juan Manuel Frias; Juan Carlos Ozuna Rosado; Kedin Maysonet; Luian Malavé Nieves; Rafael Salcedo; Rebbeca Marie Gomez; Xavier Semper	—N/a	2020	
"No Mienten"	Becky G	Joaquin Dominguez Santana; Manuel Lorente Freire; Rebbeca Marie Gomez	Esquemas	2022	
"No Te Pertenezco"	Becky G	Edgar Semper; Hector Enrique Ramos Carbia; Kedin Maysonet; Luian Malavé Nieves; Pablo C. Fuentes; Rebbeca Marie Gomez; Xavier Semper	Mala Santa	2019	
"Oasis"	Becky G	Jamil M. Pierre; Kirsten Allyssa Spencer; Rebbeca Marie Gomez; Sara Schell	Baraja Bendita	2026	
"Oath" †	Cher Lloyd featuring Becky G	Ammar Malik; Emily Wright; Daniel Omelio; Henry Russell Walter; Łukasz Gottwald; Rebbeca Marie Gomez	Sticks and Stones	2012	
"Ojalá"	Becky G	Hector Guerrero; Rebbeca Marie Gomez; Wendy Besada Rodríguez	Encuentros	2024	
"On My Body"	Tyla featuring Becky G	Akil King; Amia Brave; Ariowa Irosogie; Corey Marlon Lindsay-Keay; Imani Lewis; Rebecca Marie Gomez; Richard Isong; Samuel Awuku; Sara Schell; Tyla Seethal	Tyla	2024	
"Only One" †	Khea, Julia Michaels and Becky G featuring Di Genius	Andrea Elena Mangiamarchi; Ivo Alfredo Thomas Serue; Julia Michaels; Luis Angel O'Neill; Nir Seroussi; Rebbeca Marie Gomez; Stephen McGregror; Víctor Viera Moore	—N/a	2021	
"Otro Capítulo" (Note: "Otro Capítulo" samples "Perdóname" by La Factoría and Eddy Lover.) †	Becky G	Aldo Vargas; Andrea Elena Mangiamarchi; Édgar Barrera; Eduardo Mosquera; Luis Miguel Gómez Castaño; Rebbeca Marie Gomez	Encuentros	2024	
"Otro Día Lluvioso"	Juhn, Lenny Tavárez and Becky G featuring Dalex	Andrea Elena Mangiamarchi; Anthony Santos; Cristian Andrés Salazar; Jonathan De Jesus Gandarilla; Jorge Hernandez Quiles; Julio Manuel González Tavárez; Pedro David Daleccio Torres; Rebbeca Marie Gomez; Sharon Ramirez Lopez	—N/a	2020	
"Oye Como Va"	Playing for Change featuring Carlos Santana, Cindy Blackman Santana and Becky G	Tito Puente	—N/a	2022	
"Pa Mis Muchachas" †	Christina Aguilera, Becky G and Nicki Nicole featuring Nathy Peluso	Christina Aguilera; Jorge Luis Chacín; Katriana Huguet; Natalia Peluso; Nicole Denise Cucco; Rebbeca Marie Gomez; Yasmil Jesús Marrufo; Yoel Henríquez	Aguilera and La Fuerza	2021	
"Patras"	Becky G and Yahritza y su Esencia	Alejandro Luna Casas; Andrea Elena Mangiamarchi; Édgar Barrera; Héctor André Mazzarri Ramos; Luis Miguel Gómez Castaño; Manuel Lorente Freire; Rebbeca Marie Gomez	Esquinas	2023	
"Patrona" †	Becky G	Jamil M. Pierre; Kirsten Allyssa Spencer; Rebbeca Marie Gomez; Sara Schell	Baraja Bendita	2026	
"Peleas"	Becky G	Edgar Semper; Kedin Maysonet; Kyle Shearer; Luian Malavé Nieves; Mario Cáceres; Nathaniel Campany; Rebbeca Marie Gomez; Xavier Semper; Yasmil Jesús Marrufo	Mala Santa	2019	
"People" (Remix)	Libianca featuring Becky G	Andrea Elena Mangiamarchi; Libianca Kenzonkinboum Fonji; Orhue Moses Odia	—N/a	2023	
"Perdiendo la Cabeza" †	Carlos Rivera, Becky G and Pedro Capó	Andrés Torres; Carlos Rivera; Mauricio Rengifo	Crónicas de una Guerra	2020	
"Perreo Triste"	Becky G	Daniel Ignacio Rondón; Elvin Jesus Roubert-Rodriguez; Manuel Lorente Freire; Rebbeca Marie Gomez	Baraja Bendita	2026	
"Pienso en Ti" †	Joss Favela and Becky G	Joss Favela	Caminando	2018	
"Play It Again"	Becky G	Henry Russell Walter; Joshua Coleman; Łukasz Gottwald; Niles Hollowell-Dhar; Max Martin; Rebbeca Marie Gomez	Play It Again	2013	
"Por el Contrario" (Note: She released Acapella and Demo Versions in August 2024.) †	Becky G, Ángela Aguilar and Leonardo Aguilar	Andrea Elena Mangiamarchi; Édgar Barrera; Kevyn Mauricio Cruz Moreno; Rebbeca Marie Gomez	Esquinas and Encuentros (Note: The Demo Version appeared in this album.)	2023	
"Por un Amor"	Becky G	Gilberto Parra	Esquinas	2023	
"+Pretty"	Becky G	Dylan Brady; Nathaniel Campany; Rebbeca Marie Gomez; Sara Schell; Sol Was	Baraja Bendita	2026	
"Problem (The Monster Remix)" (Note: "Problem" was released on August 6, 2012, but was only made available on the YouTube.)	Becky G featuring will.i.am	Henry Russell Walter; Łukasz Gottwald; Rebbeca Marie Gomez; William Adams	Hotel Transylvania	2012	
"Un Puño de Tierra"	Becky G	Carlos Coral	Esquinas	2023	
"Que Haces" †	Becky G and Manuel Turizo	Alejandro Robledo Valencia; Cristian Camilo Alvarez Ospina; Daniel Ignacio Rondón; Manuel Lorente Freire; Manuel Turizo Zapata; Rebbeca Marie Gomez	—N/a	2025	
"Que Le Muerda"	Becky G	Andrea Elena Mangiamarchi; Dwayne Chin-Quee; Rebbeca Marie Gomez; Stephanie Lavergne Torres; Valentina López	Esquemas	2022	
"Qué Maldición" (Remix) †	Banda MS featuring Snoop Dogg and Becky G	Andrea Elena Mangiamarchi; Calvin Cordazor Broadus; Daniel Anthony Farris; Jesús Omar Tarazón Medina; Maurice Simmonds; Pavel Josue Ocampo Quintero; Rebbeca Marie Gomez	—N/a	2020	
"Que Me Baile" †	ChocQuibTown and Becky G	Carlos Valencia; Felipe Arias; Gloria Martínez; Johnattan Gaviria; Juan Camilo Vargas; Kevyn Mauricio Cruz Moreno; Miguel Martínez; Rebecca Marie Gomez; Yhoan Jimenez	ChocQuib House	2019	
"Que Nos Animemos" †	Axel featuring Becky G	Axel Witteveen; Daniel Sartori	Ser	2017	
"Querido Abuelo" †	Becky G	Édgar Barrera; Juan Pablo Zazueta Acosta; Jesús Omar Tarazón Medina; Rebbeca Marie Gomez	Esquinas	2023	
"Quiero Bailar (All Through the Night)" †	3Ball MTY featuring Becky G	Henry Russell Walter	—N/a	2013	
"Ram Pam Pam" (Note: A remix of the song with Vanessa Mai was released in September 2021.) †	Natti Natasha and Becky G	Andrea Elena Mangiamarchi; Francisco Saldaña; Jean Carlos Hernández Espinal; Juan Manuel Frias; Justin Rafael Quiles; Natalia Gutiérrez Batista; Nino Karlo Segarra; Ovimael Maldonado Burgos; Rafael Pina Nieves; Ramón Luis Ayala; Rebbeca Marie Gomez; Siggy Vázquez; Valentina López; Jens Schneider (Note: Credited as the songwriter on the remix version.); Jules Kalmbacher; Vanessa Ferber	Nattividad and Esquemas	2021	
"Rebota" (Remix) †	Guaynaa, Nicky Jam and Farruko featuring Becky G and Sech	Andy Bauza; Carlos Efren Correa; Carlos De Jesús Rodríguez; Carlos Isaias Morales Williams; Edgar Semper; Enrique L. Piñeiro Rivera; Franklin Jovani Martinez; Jean Carlos Santiago Pérez; Juan Diego Medina; Juan L. Rivera Medina; Jorge Valdés Vázquez; Kedin Maysonet; Luian Malavé Nieves; Marcos G. Pérez; Nick Rivera Caminero; Pablo C. Fuentes; Rebbeca Marie Gomez; Wander Manuel Mendez; Xavier Semper	BRB Be Right Back	2019	
"La Respuesta" †	Becky G and Maluma	Édgar Barrera; Juan Luis Londoño Arias; Rebbeca Marie Gomez	—N/a	2019	
"Rewind"	Blxst, Feid and Becky G	Akil King; Benjamin M. Wilson; David Marcus; Matthew Burdette; Nico Baran; Rebecca Marie Gomez; Salomón Villada Hoyos; Sara Schell; Stephane Antoine	I'll Always Come Find You	2024	
"Rollin"	Austin Mahone featuring Becky G	—N/a	This Is Not the Album	2015	
"Rotate"	Becky G and Burna Boy	Andrea Elena Mangiamarchi; Damini Ebunoluwa Ogulu; Janée Bennett; Nathaniel Campany; Pierre-Antoine Melki; Rebbeca Marie Gomez; Raphaël Judrin; Stephen McGregor	—N/a	2021	
"Secrets" †	Becky G	Dwayne Chin-Quee; Marco Masís; Misael De La Cruz; Theron Thomas	—N/a	2019	
"Shower" †	Becky G	Henry Russell Walter; Łukasz Gottwald; Rebbeca Marie Gomez	—N/a	2014	
"Si Si"	Becky G	Edgar Semper; Kedin Maysonet; Luian Malavé Nieves; Pablo C. Fuentes; Rebbeca Marie Gomez; Xavier Semper	Mala Santa	2019	
"Si Una Vez (If I Once)" †	Play-N-Skillz featuring Frankie J, Becky G and Kap G	Abraham Quintanilla; Pete Astudillo	—N/a	2017	
"Sin Pijama" †	Becky G and Natti Natasha	Camilo Echeverry; Juan Gabriel Rivera; Jonathan Leone; Kyle Shearer; Natalia Gutiérrez Batista; Nathaniel Campany; Mauricio Reglero Rodríguez; Rafael Pina Nieves; Ramón Luis Ayala; Rebbeca Marie Gomez; Ricardo Reglero Rodríguez	Mala Santa	2018	
"Sola" †	Becky G	Alexander Castillo Vasquez; Martin Rodriguez Vincente; Rebbeca Marie Gomez; Steven Dominguez	—N/a	2016	
"Sorry Papi" (Note: "Sorry Papi" samples "La Colegiala" by Walter León Aguilar.) †	Topic and Becky G	Alexander Tidebrink; Daniel Ignacio Rondón; Héctor André Mazzarri Ramos; Loris Cimino; Manuel Lorente Freire; Maximilian Riehl; Rebbeca Marie Gomez; Tobias Topic; Walter León Aguilar	—N/a	2026	
"Subiendo"	Becky G and Dalex	Edgar Semper; Freddy Ignacio Vargas; Kedin Maysonet; Luian Malavé Nieves; Pedro David Daleccio Torres; Rebbeca Marie Gomez; Xavier Semper	Mala Santa	2019	
"Superstar"	Pitbull featuring Becky G	Armando Christian Pérez; Rebbeca Marie Gomez	—N/a	2016	
"Tajin"	Becky G and Guaynaa	Andrea Elena Mangiamarchi; Dwayne Chin-Quee; Édgar Barrera; Jean Carlos Santiago Pérez; Rebbeca Marie Gomez; Stephanie Lavergne Torres; Valentina López	Esquemas	2022	
"Take It Off" †	Lil Jon featuring Yandel and Becky G	Chloe Angelides; Jonathan Smith; Llandel Veguilla Malavé; Rebbeca Marie Gomez	—N/a	2016	
"Take It to the Top"	Becky G and Ayra Starr	Akil King; Jenny Berggren; Jocelyn Donald; Jonas Berggren; Malin Berggren; Oyinkansola Sarah Aderibigbe; Taylor Parks; Stephen McGregor; Ulf Ekberg	Spider-Man: Across the Spider-Verse	2023	
"Te Olvido (La La)" †	Benny Blanco, Selena Gomez and Becky G	Benjamin Levin; Kevyn Mauricio Cruz Moreno; Magnus August Høiberg; Nathaniel Campany; Rebbeca Marie Gomez; Sara Schell; Selena Marie Gomez	Hermoso	2026	
"Te Quiero Besar" †	Fuerza Regida and Becky G	Alexis Fierro; Édgar Barrera; Jesús Ortiz Paz; Rebbeca Marie Gomez	—N/a	2023	
"Te Superé"	Becky G, Zion & Lennox and Farruko	Edgar Semper; Kedin Maysonet; Luian Malavé Nieves; Pablo C. Fuentes; Rebbeca Marie Gomez; Xavier Semper	Mala Santa	2019	
"Te Va Bien" †	Kevvo, Arcángel and Becky G featuring Darell	Andrea Elena Mangiamarchi; Austin Agustín Santos; Cristian Jose Restrepo Herrera; Kevin Manuel Rivera Allende; Osvaldo Elías Castro Hernández; Pedro J. Figueroa Quintana; Rebbeca Marie Gomez	Cotidiano	2021	
"Te Va Doler"	Becky G	Rebbeca Marie Gomez	Baraja Bendita	2026	
"Tek" (Note: "Tek" samples "Careless Whisper" by George Michael.)	Davido featuring Becky G	Akil King; Andrew Ridgeley; David Adedeji Adeleke; George Michael; Jason J. Lopez; Mohombi Mopoundo; Rebbeca Marie Gomez; Sara Schell	5ive	2025	
"They Ain't Ready" †	Becky G	Atia Boggs; Dwayne Chin-Quee; Gabriel Blizman; John P Shullman; Theron Thomas	—N/a	2020	
"Tiempo Pa Olvidar" †	Abraham Mateo and Becky G	Abraham Mateo; Andrés Uribe Marín; Edgar Andino; Juan Camilo Vargas; Kevyn Mauricio Cruz Moreno; Lenin Yorney Palacios Machado; Rebbeca Marie Gomez	Sigo a Lo Mío	2020	
"Todo"	Becky G and Delilah	Delilah Cabrera; Diego Bolela; Horacio Palencia; Nathan Galante; Rebbeca Marie Gomez; Sara Schell; Verónica Minguez	Encuentros	2024	
"Todo Cambió" (Note: She released two remixes: the first featuring CNCO in March, and the second with Justin Quiles in April 2017.) †	Becky G	Alexander Castillo Vasquez; Gamal Lewis; Jeff Marco Martinez; Mathieu Jomphe-Lépine; Martin Rodriguez Vicente; Rebbeca Marie Gomez; Steven Dominguez	—N/a	2017	
"Todo Lo Que Quiero"	Yandel featuring Becky G	Egbert Rosa Cintrón; Jesús Manuel Nieves Cortés; Llandel Veguilla Malavé; Rebbeca Marie Gomez	Update	2017	
"Tonight" (Note: "Tonight" samples "Tonight, Tonight, Tonight" by Genesis.) †	Black Eyed Peas and El Alfa featuring Becky G	Emmanuel Herrera Batista; Mike Rutherford; Phil Collins; Rebbeca Marie Gomez; Sara Schell; Tony Banks; William Adams; Yonatan Goldstein	Bad Boys: Ride or Die	2024	
"TQM/ILY"	Becky G	Jamil M. Pierre; Nathaniel Campany; Rebbeca Marie Gomez; Sara Schell	Baraja Bendita	2026	
"Ultima Vez"	Becky G	Justus West; Manuel Lorente Freire; Nathaniel Campany; Rebbeca Marie Gomez; Sara Schell	Encuentros	2024	
"Una Mas"	Becky G	Joan Josep Monserrat Riutort; Nathaniel Campany; Manuel Lorente Freire; Rebbeca Marie Gomez; Stephen McGregor	Esquemas	2022	
"Unsend"	Becky G	Andrés Jael Correa Rios; Daniel Ignacio Rondón; Héctor André Mazzarri Ramos; Jorge Milliano; Manuel Lorente Freire; Rebbeca Marie Gomez	Baraja Bendita	2026	
"Vai Danada (Funk Total)" †	Pk featuring Becky G and Gabily	Andrea Elena Mangiamarchi; Donato Verissimo; Édgar Barrera; Jefferson Júnior; Maurice Simmonds; Roberto Kauê; Umberto Tavares	—N/a	2020	
"Vámonos"	Becky G and Sech	Carlos Isaías Morales Williams; Edgar Semper; Jorge Valdés Vásquez; Joshua Javier Méndez; Justin Rafael Quiles; Luian Malavé Nieves; Rebbeca Marie Gomez; Xavier Semper	Mala Santa	2019	
"Visto Caro" (Note: Hector Guerrero provided uncredited vocals for "Visto Caro".)	Becky G	Hector Guerrero; Rebbeca Marie Gomez; Sara Schell	Encuentros	2024	
"We Are Mexico"	Becky G	Rebbeca Marie Gomez	—N/a	2015	
"Wild Mustang" †	Yellow Claw and Cesqeaux featuring Becky G	Daniel Tuparia; Eyelar Mirzazadeh; Jim Taihuttu; Leendert Roelandschap; Nils Rondhuis; Reid Stefan	Blood for Mercy	2015	
"Wish U Were Here" †	Cody Simpson featuring Becky G	Bonnie McKee; Henry Russell Walter; Jake C. Lewis; Łukasz Gottwald; Rebbeca Marie Gomez; Taio Cruz	Paradise	2012	
"Wow Wow" †	María Becerra featuring Becky G	Andrea Elena Mangiamarchi; Enzo Ezequiel Sauthier; María de los Ángeles Becerra; Rebbeca Marie Gomez	Animal	2021	
"XLas Nubes"	Becky G	Adrián Pieragostino; Hector Guerrero; Rebbeca Marie Gomez	Encuentros	2024	
"Ya Acabó" †	Marca MP and Becky G	Andrea Elena Mangiamarchi; Édgar Barrera; Pedro Junior Vargas Vaca	—N/a	2022	
"Ya Es Hora" †	Ana Mena, Becky G and De la Ghetto	Bruno Nicolás; David Augustave; José Luis de la Peña; María José Fernández; Pablo C. Fuentes; Rafael Castillo Torres	Index	2018	
"You Belong"	Becky G	Casey Smith; Jake Torrey; Michael Pollack; Zach Skelton	Spirit Untamed	2021	
"You Love It"	Becky G	Henry Russell Walter; Łukasz Gottwald; Rebbeca Marie Gomez; Theron Thomas; Timothy Thomas	—N/a	2015	
"Zona del Perreo"	Daddy Yankee, Natti Natasha and Becky G	Carlos Enrique Rivera Ortiz; Juan Gabriel Rivera; Natalia Gutiérrez Batista; Ovimael Maldonado Burgos; Rafael Pina Nieves; Ramón Luis Ayala; Rebecca Marie Gomez	Legendaddy	2022	
"Zoomin' Zoomin'"	Becky G	Henry Russell Walter; Łukasz Gottwald; Mathieu Jomphe-Lepine; Rebecca Marie Gomez; William Adams	Play It Again	2013	
"Zooted"	Becky G featuring French Montana and Farruko	Carlos Efrén Reyes Rosado; Dwayne Chin-Quee; Franklin Martinez; Karim Kharbouch; Marco Masís	—N/a	2018	

== Unreleased songs ==
Unreleased songs recorded by Becky G.
Title	Artist(s)	Year
"All Day All I Dream About Is LA"	Becky G	2010
"Bésame"	Becky G	2017
"Christmas Soldier (It Ain't Christmas)"	Becky G	2015
"Down For Me (Freestyle)"	Becky G	2021
"Espada"	Becky G	2017
"Garden"	Becky G	2015
"Goodbye"	Becky G	2015
"Grow"	Becky G	2016
"Jump (Na Na Na Na Na)"	Becky G	2015
"Lento (La Noche No Se Acaba)"	Becky G	2017
"Makes Me Wanna Say"	Becky G	2015
"Mala"	Becky G	2016
"Money Maker"	Becky G	2014
"Piropo" (Remix)	Noriel, Becky G, Cazzu, Nakary, Chencho Corleone, Darell and Kevvo	—N/a
"Romance"	Becky G and Anuel AA	—N/a
"Tick-Tock"	Becky G	2012
"Tiempo"	Becky G	2017
"Toda" (Remix)	Anuel AA, Alex Rose, Zion and Becky G	2016
"Y Ahora Que No Estas Aqui"	Omar Montes and Becky G	2021

== See also ==
- Becky G discography
