= Mayores =

2017 single by Becky G and Bad Bunny

Single by Becky G and Bad Bunny

from the album Mala Santa
- Language: Spanish
- English title: "Older Ones"
- Released: July 14, 2017
- Recorded: February 2017
- Genre: Latin pop; reggaeton; cumbia
- Length: 3:22
- Label: Kemosabe
- Songwriters: Servando Primera; Mario Caceres; Patrick Ingunza; Alexander Castillo; Benito Antonio Martinez
- Producer: Jorge Fonseca

Becky G singles chronology
"Que Nos Animemos" (2017)	"Mayores" (2017)	"Díganle" (2017)

Bad Bunny singles chronology
"Tu No Metes Cabra" (2017)	"Mayores" (2017)	"Báilame (Remix)" (2017)

Music video
- "Mayores" on YouTube

"Mayores" is a song by American singer Becky G and Puerto Rican rapper Bad Bunny. Written by Mario Caceres, Servando Primera, Saul Castillo, Bad Bunny, and Patrick Ingunza, it was released on July 14, 2017, by Kemosabe Records, as the lead single from Gomez's debut studio album Mala Santa.

"Mayores" topped the charts in Spain, Ecuador, Chile, Paraguay, Peru, Bolivia, Honduras, Mexico, Nicaragua, Panama and El Salvador, while peaking at number 3 on the Billboard Hot Latin Songs chart. The music video for the song was released on YouTube on July 13, 2017, and has accumulated over 2.5 billion views on YouTube as of October 2025.

== Background ==
Gomez explained that the song originated as a "joke" after having confirmed her relationship with soccer player Sebastian Lletget, who is five years older than her. She started using the hashtag "#6DaysTillMAYORES" on Twitter which eventually started trending. A number became lower with each passing day, until it reached "#MAYORESOutNow".

== Chart performance ==
"Mayores" debuted at number 12 on the Hot Latin Songs chart, making it Gomez's highest debut peak position on that chart. The song eventually peaked at number 3 on the charts.

The song also debuted at number 72 on the Spanish PROMUSICAE chart. It rose to number 4 four weeks later, making it her highest-peaking position, surpassing the number 37 peak of "Shower". It later reached number one.

The song eventually charted on the Billboard Hot 100, peaking at number 74. This marked Gomez’s fourth appearance on the chart in over two years, following her top-twenty hit “Shower” (2014), her collaboration with Cher Lloyd, “Oath” (2012), which peaked at number 73, and “Can't Stop Dancin'” (2014), which reached number 88 in early 2015. The song also earned Bad Bunny his first entry on the Hot 100.

== Music video ==
The music video, filmed in Los Angeles and San Francisco, was uploaded on Gomez's Vevo account on July 13, 2017. It stars actor Casper Smart, who previously appeared in the music video for Gomez's "Becky from the Block" in 2013, with then-partner Jennifer Lopez. As of October 2025, the video has received over 2.5 billion views on YouTube.

=== Premise ===
The clip sees Gomez lying on a couch spliced with scenes of her and Bad Bunny working as a waitress and bartender at a bar, with both featuring neon lighting. Casper Smart, playing an older, wealthy man, enters the bar and is attracted to Gomez. He takes her to his house as Bad Bunny raps his verses at the bar. These scenes are also cut with the singers performing on the roof of the Hotel Rosslyn Annex at night. Gomez seduces Smart and handcuffs him to the bed. She plays with his watch before getting off the bed and leaving with a bag full of money. Bad Bunny appears to be waiting for her, and they kiss before getting in the car. The video ends with the duo driving off.

== Live performances ==
Due to its growing success, Gomez was invited to sing the song at several radio stations and interviews, performing with both the original instrumentation and an acoustic version. She performed both of these at iHeart Radio Mi Música. She sang the latter version at La Vida Moderna and Sale el Sol, and the former on Operación Triunfo in Spain. Her performance on the latter garnered some attention due to a lyrical change at the producers' request, believing the song was "too sexual". Although Gomez agreed, she later stated it bothered her and said she accepted "out of respect" and because it was "a great opportunity", but believes that it wouldn't be done to a man, listing Ozuna and Enrique Iglesias as examples.

Gomez performed the song with Bad Bunny at the Latin American Music Awards of 2017, which she also hosted; the performance was later uploaded to YouTube and has garnered over 91 million views. The song was included on her setlist as an opening act for Fifth Harmony's 2017 PSA Tour and on her own short concert series in 2018. "Mayores" was the closing number in her performance at Viña del Mar on March 2, 2019, her 21st birthday. Gomez and Bad Bunny performed the song at the latter's X 100pPre Tour on March 8 and April 22. She included "Mayores" in three medleys: the first at the 2019 Latin American Music Awards together with "Sin Pijama" and "Mala Santa", before receiving the Extraordinary Evolution Award from Pitbull. The second time was at the 2019 MTV Europe Music Awards, this time with "24/7", a track from her debut album replacing "Mala Santa". The third time was at the LOS40 Music Awards 2019 with the original medley. All three performances had different arrangements. In the latter performance, Gomez rewrote Bad Bunny's verse from a female perspective, and included a reference to her appearance in Daddy Yankee's "Dura (Remix)", which also featured Bad Bunny and Natti Natasha. Gomez performed the song at Coachella 2023 on April 14 and 21, 2023.

== Critical reception ==
Publication	List	Rank	Ref.
Billboard	Billboard’s 20 Best Latin Songs	6	
Billboard	Billboard’s 100 Best Songs	73	
Idolator	The Best Latin Pop Songs	4	
Rolling Stone	100 Greatest Reggaeton Songs of All Time	78	

== Accolades ==
Awards and nominations for "Mayores"
Organization	Year	Category	Result	Ref.
ASCAP Latin Awards	2019	Winning Songs (Note: Awards and nominations Bad Bunny, Jorge Luis Fonseca and Saúl Alexánder Castillo Vásquez have received as songwriters.)	Won	
Billboard Music Awards	2018	Top Latin Song	Nominated	
BMI Latin Awards	2019	Winning Song (Note: Awards and nominations Mario Caceres, Patrick Ingunza and Servando Moriche Primera Mussett have received as songwriters.)	Won	
Latin American Music Awards	2018	Favorite Urban Song	Won	
Latin American Music Awards	2018	Song of the Year	Nominated	
Latin Music Italian Awards	2017	Best Latin Collaboration of The Year	Nominated	
Latin Music Italian Awards	2017	Best Latin Female Video of The Year	Nominated	

== Track listings ==
Digital download
No.	Title	Length
1.	"Mayores" (with Bad Bunny)	3:22

Digital download
No.	Title	Length
1.	"Mayores" (Urban Tropical)	3:30

Digital download
No.	Title	Length
1.	"Mayores" (KLAP Remix ft. Lucas Lucco)	3:15

== Personnel ==
- Jorge Fonseca – production
- Yasmil Marrufo – engineering, guiro
- Richard Bravo – engineering, percussion
- Mambo Kingz – engineering
- Gaby Music – engineering
- Mike Fuller – master engineering

Credits adapted from Qobuz.

== Charts ==
=== Weekly charts ===
Chart (2017–2018)	Peak position
Argentina (Monitor Latino)	5
Bolivia (Monitor Latino)	1
Chile (Monitor Latino)	1
Colombia (Monitor Latino)	9
Colombia (National-Report)	8
Costa Rica (Monitor Latino)	9
Dominican Republic (Monitor Latino)	2
Ecuador (Monitor Latino)	1
Ecuador (National-Report)	1
El Salvador (Monitor Latino)	1
Guatemala (Monitor Latino)	2
Honduras (Monitor Latino)	1
Hungary (Dance Top 40)	23
Latin America (Monitor Latino)	3
Mexico (Billboard Mexican Airplay)	33
Mexico (Mexico Español Airplay)	11
Netherlands Tip (Single Top 100)	6
Nicaragua (Monitor Latino)	1
Panama (Monitor Latino)	1
Paraguay (Monitor Latino)	1
Peru (Monitor Latino)	1
Poland Airplay (ZPAV)	14
Romania Airplay (Media Forest)	3
Romania TV Airplay (Media Forest)	1
Slovenia (SloTop50)	14
Spain (PROMUSICAE)	1
Uruguay (Monitor Latino)	5
US Billboard Hot 100	74
US Hot Latin Songs (Billboard)	3
US Latin Airplay (Billboard)	1
US Latin Rhythm Airplay (Billboard)	1
US Regional Mexican Airplay (Billboard)	18
Venezuela (Monitor Latino)	14
Venezuela (National-Report)	3

=== Year-end charts ===
Chart (2017)	Position
Argentina (Monitor Latino)	86
Bolivia (Monitor Latino)	15
Chile (Monitor Latino)	10
Dominican Republic (Monitor Latino)	75
Ecuador (Monitor Latino)	50
El Salvador (Monitor Latino)	2
Guatemala (Monitor Latino)	51
Honduras (Monitor Latino)	1
Nicaragua (Monitor Latino)	1
Peru (Monitor Latino)	19
Spain (PROMUSICAE)	15
Uruguay (Monitor Latino)	52
US Hot Latin Songs (Billboard)	18
Chart (2018)	Position
Argentina (Monitor Latino)	28
Hungary (Dance Top 40)	88
Romania (Airplay 100)	12
Slovenia (SloTop50)	40
Spain (PROMUSICAE)	59
US Hot Latin Songs (Billboard)	16
US Latin Pop Airplay Songs (Billboard)	24
Chart (2019)	Position
Hungary (Dance Top 40)	69
Chart (2021)	Position
Nicaragua Urbano (Monitor Latino)	78

== Certifications ==
Region	Certification	Certified units/sales
Brazil (Pro-Música Brasil)	Platinum	60,000^{‡}
France (SNEP)	Gold	100,000^{‡}
Italy (FIMI)	Gold	25,000^{‡}
Mexico (AMPROFON)	2× Diamond+3× Platinum	780,000^{‡}
Poland (ZPAV)	2× Platinum	40,000^{‡}
Portugal (AFP)	Gold	5,000^{‡}
Spain (Promusicae)	5× Platinum	200,000^{‡}
United States (RIAA)	46× Platinum (Latin)	2,760,000^{‡}
^{‡} Sales+streaming figures based on certification alone.

== Release history ==
Release dates and formats for "Mayores"
Region	Date	Format(s)	Label(s)	Ref.
Various	July 14, 2017	Digital download; streaming	Kemosabe	

== See also ==
- List of Billboard Hot Latin Songs and Latin Airplay number ones of 2018
