= Alex Luna =

Alex Luna may refer to:

- Alex Luna (Ukrainian singer) (born 1986), Ukrainian countertenor
- Alex Luna (footballer) (born 2004), Argentine attacking midfielder
- Alex Luna (Mexican singer) (born 2001), Mexican singer and songwriter
- Axo (comics), alias Alejandro 'Alex' Luna, a Marvel Comics character
