= El Mercado de Los Ángeles =

Market in Boyle Heights, California

Coordinates: 34.03701°N 118.19392°W

El Mercado de Los Ángeles, sometimes referred to simply as El Mercadito, is a market located in Boyle Heights on the corner of 1st Street and Lorena Street. El Mercado is a three-floor indoor shopping center that offers dining and restaurant services, entertainment with live mariachi bands and shopping from various vendors. The market is located by the Metro E Line's Indiana Station located two blocks east.

== History ==
The market was built in 1968 as a multi-ethnic market. On the former site of the Boyle Heights Lumber Company, Pedro Rosado acquired majority shares and became owner of the market in 1988. Pedro and his wife, Mercedes, worked tirelessly to build and maintain the market—Mercedes continuing her efforts well into her 80s. That mother, who worked so hard alongside her father.

The music video for "Epa" by Becky G was filmed at El Mercado de Los Ángeles.

== The Third Floor and Restaurant ==
The third floor contains one restaurant named El Mercadito de Los Mariachis. is themed in to three different restaurants representing different cities of Mexico that make up the one large restaurant. Mariachi bands play on the restaurant's three stages, which are all built to different Latin themes.

== Monetary and cultural remittances at El Mercado ==
El Mercado de Los Angeles offers a variety of services that help send off monetary remittances to Latin America. The Mercado also provides travel and calling services that help customers participate in the formation of cultural remittances to Latin America.

=== Monetary remittances at El Mercado ===
El Mercado also serves as an important site of cultural and monetary remittances between the United States and Mexico, specifically. This mercado is a site of cultural that is the product of cultural hybridities. It is also a site that actively constructs cultural hybridities in the United States and Mexico. El Mercado offers services to send money back to Mexico securely as well as offering a currency exchange between pesos and United States dollars. Customers are able to send monetary remittance home to Mexico by using the services at the Mercado. These services also assist vendors at the Mercado send some of the profits that they make at the Mercado to family members or communities abroad. These remittances are often directed at families or hometown associations.

=== Cultural remittances at El Mercado ===
The Mercado de Los Angeles also facilitates opportunities to create cultural remittances for Latino migrants. The mercado offers international calling services and a travel agency that sells international plane tickets. These services aid the fluid migratory process that physically transports migrants from their countries of origin to the countries of current residence. Along with the physical transportation, the Mercado specializes in transcultural goods and items. Many of the stores specialize in traditional Mexican clothing, books, or films. Yet, these traditional items are presented in a transcultural context, outside of Mexico or Latin America. The mercado becomes a transcultural site that participates in cultural remittance when it facilitates the physical circular migration of migrants returning to their home country. Migrants returning home bring cultural remittances to the land that they left, and El Mercado de Los Angeles is an important site of this cultural remittance process in Los Angeles.
