= Sola (Becky G song) =

2016 single by Becky G

Single by Becky G
- Language: Spanish
- English title: "Alone"
- Released: June 24, 2016
- Recorded: 2016
- Genre: Tropical house; reggaeton
- Length: 3:55
- Label: Kemosabe
- Songwriters: Rebbeca Marie Gomez; Steven Dominguez; Martin Rodriguez Vincente
- Producer: A.C.

Becky G singles chronology
"Break a Sweat" (2015)	"Sola" (2016)	"Take It Off" (2016)

Music video
- "Sola" on YouTube

"Sola" is a song recorded by American singer Becky G. It was released on June 24, 2016, through Kemosabe Records as the initial lead single from her then upcoming Spanish debut album, although it was later scrapped from the LP (which was titled Mala Santa and released in 2019). "Sola" was written by Gomez alongside Saul Alexander Castillo Vasquez (who produced the song under his alias name A.C.), Steven Dominguez, and Martin Rodriguez Vicente; it is her first song to be recorded entirely in Spanish. The song features elements of reggaeton, urban, and Latin music, and lyrically speaks of gaining freedom after the conclusion of a negative relationship.

== Release ==
The single was released on June 24, 2016, to digital platforms. The audio was uploaded onto Gomez's VEVO account on the same day. A lyric video was uploaded on July 18. An Instagram post by Gomez confirmed that an English version of the song has been recorded, but ultimately never released. The song is featured on the soundtrack to the 2018 video game The Crew 2.

== Reception ==
Upon its release, "Sola" received a generally positive reception from music critics. Billboard praised the use of reggaeton elements in the song's production, while PopSugar described the song as her "sexiest" release yet. "Sola" had some success on Billboard subsidiary charts; it reached number 18 on the Hot Latin Songs chart, and number 11 on the Latin Pop Songs chart.

== Live performances ==
Gomez first performed the single at the 2016 Premios Juventud, paying tribute to Britney Spears' performance of "I'm a Slave 4 U" (2001) at the 2001 MTV Video Music Awards. She sang "Sola" during her set in Splash Kingdom. She later performed a short version at La Banda, in a medley with "Mangú". Gomez performed "Sola" in her shows from 2017 to 2018, and it was included in her setlist when she was the opening act for Fifth Harmony in their PSA Tour during select Latin American dates.

== Music video ==
The accompanying music video, released on August 26, was co-directed by Gomez with Frank Borin. It features Ray Diaz as Gomez's ex-boyfriend and one of her dancers as her ex's new girlfriend. The video has over 292 million views as of September 2024. Gomez was inspired to make a "cinematic" music video while on the set of her feature film debut Power Rangers (2017).

The premise opens with Gomez attending her own funeral under cover. The scene is cut with the singer riding in a red car across a desert. The video then shows of what appears to be what she did before "committing suicide" and using a new appearance. Flashes of Gomez and her boyfriend fighting in the car, the latter abusing Gomez by pulling her cheeks, and some verbal abuse in a fast food restaurant are shown. Gomez is later seen arriving at a café where her now-ex-boyfriend is abusing his new girlfriend (the same way as he did with Gomez). After slashing his car tire, she takes the dress of a waiter while passing a note to the new girlfriend. After her ex-boyfriend gets out the café, only to realize that the former busted one of his car tires, she and the girl drive off into the road, leading to a cliffhanger.

== Credits and personnel ==
- Saul Alexander Castillo Vasquez – composing, drums programming, producing
- Martin Rodriguez Vincente – composing
- Steven Dominguez – composing
- Rebbeca Marie Gomez – composing
- Max Borghetti – engineering
- Rachael Findlen – engineering
- Joe LaPorta – master engineering
- Clint Gibbs – mixing engineering

== Accolades ==
Year	Awards	Category	Result	Ref.
2016	Latin Music Italian Awards	Best Latin Female Video of The Year	Nominated	

== Charts ==
Chart (2016)	Peak position
Chile (Monitor Latino)	6
Mexico (Mexico Español Airplay)	17
Spain (PROMUSICAE)	83
US Hot Latin Songs (Billboard)	18
US Latin Airplay (Billboard)	35
US Latin Pop Airplay (Billboard)	11
US Twitter Top Tracks (Billboard)	49

=== Year-end charts ===
Chart (2016)	Position
US Billboard Hot Latin Songs	63

== Release history ==
Release dates and formats for "Sola"
Region	Date	Format(s)	Label(s)	Ref.
Various	June 24, 2016	Digital download; streaming	Kemosabe	
