= Marathon (Becky G and Elkan song) =

Single by Becky G and Elkan

from the album Baraja Bendita
- Language: English; Spanish
- Released: March 27, 2026
- Recorded: 2025
- Studio: Just for the Record (Sun Valley, CA)
- Length: 2:50
- Label: RCA
- Songwriters: Rebbeca Marie Gomez; Paul Omar Elkan Agyei; Kavin Smith; Sara Schell; Sian Imani Hannah Emeh
- Producer: Elkan

Becky G singles chronology
| "Que Haces" (2025) | "Marathon" (2026) | "Sorry Papi" (2026) |

Elkan singles chronology
| "Marathon" (2026) | "Robotic Love" (2026) |

Music video
- "Marathon" on YouTube

"Marathon" (stylized in all caps) is a song recorded by American singer Becky G and British music producer Elkan. Released by RCA Records on March 27, 2026, it serves as the lead single from Gomez's fifth studio album, Baraja Bendita. "Marathon" is a pop song with elements of hip-hop and electropop.

== Music video ==
The music video was released on March 27. It was directed by Alex Thurmond in Los Angeles. The clip begins with Gomez receiving a call, with her single "Shower" as the ringtone. Gomez, now wearing a red outfit, walks through a "graffiti-lined plaza" in an old Italian neighborhood, approaching women sitting in tables on the street and singing with them before they all perform a short choreographed number. During Elkan's verse, men shine Gomez's shoes and hand her a glass of alcoholic beverage, before putting a brown fur coat on her. In the next sequence, she sports yellow clothes with red boots and the coat, performing more choreographed dance moves. She climbs on top of a car to sing the second verse, and the video ends with her walking in front of fans and paparazzi as the last chorus plays.

== Charts ==
| Chart (2026) | Peak position |
|---|---|
| Honduras Anglo Airplay (Monitor Latino) | 10 |
| US Latin Digital Song Sales (Billboard) | 11 |

== Release history ==
Release dates and formats for "Marathon"
| Region | Date | Format | Label | Ref. |
|---|---|---|---|---|
| Various | March 27, 2026 | Digital download; streaming | RCA | |
