= List of number-one Billboard Latin Pop Airplay songs of 2022 =

The Billboard Latin Pop Airplay is a subchart of the Latin Airplay chart that ranks the most-played Latin pop songs on Latin radio stations. Published by Billboard magazine, the data are compiled by Nielsen SoundScan based collectively on each single's weekly airplay.

== Chart history ==
Issue date	Song	Artist	Ref
January 1	"Todo de Ti"	Rauw Alejandro	
January 8	"Todo de Ti"	Rauw Alejandro	
January 15	"Todo de Ti"	Rauw Alejandro	
January 22	"Todo de Ti"	Rauw Alejandro	
January 29	"Todo de Ti"	Rauw Alejandro	
February 5	"Todo de Ti"	Rauw Alejandro	
February 12	"Todo de Ti"	Rauw Alejandro	
February 19	"Tacones Rojos"	Sebastián Yatra	
February 26	"Tacones Rojos"	Sebastián Yatra	
March 5	"Tacones Rojos"	Sebastián Yatra	
March 12	"Tacones Rojos"	Sebastián Yatra	
March 19	"Mamiii"	Becky G and Karol G	
March 26	"Mamiii"	Becky G and Karol G	
April 2	"Mamiii"	Becky G and Karol G	
April 9	"Forever My Love"	J Balvin and Ed Sheeran	
April 16	"Mamiii"	Becky G and Karol G	
April 23	"Mamiii"	Becky G and Karol G	
April 30	"Mamiii"	Becky G and Karol G	
May 7	"Te Felicito"	Shakira and Rauw Alejandro	
May 14	"Mamiii"	Becky G and Karol G	
May 21	"Mamiii"	Becky G and Karol G	
May 28	"Mamiii"	Becky G and Karol G	
June 4	"Mamiii"	Becky G and Karol G	
June 11	"Mamiii"	Becky G and Karol G	
June 18	"Baloncito Viejo"	Carlos Vives and Camilo	
June 25	"Mamiii"	Becky G and Karol G	
July 2	"Mamiii"	Becky G and Karol G	
July 9	"Provenza"	Karol G	
July 16	"Mamiii"	Becky G and Karol G	
July 23	"Buenos Días"	Wisin and Camilo	
July 30	"Provenza"	Karol G	
August 6	"Provenza"	Karol G	
August 13	"Mamiii"	Becky G and Karol G	
August 20	"Provenza"	Karol G	
August 27	"A Veces Bien Y A Veces Mal"	Ricky Martin and Reik	
September 3	"Provenza"	Karol G	
September 10	"Bailé Con Mi Ex"	Becky G	
September 17	"Provenza"	Karol G	
September 24	"Provenza"	Karol G	
October 1	"Llorar y Llorar"	Mau y Ricky and Carin León	
October 8	"Provenza"	Karol G	
October 15	"Junio"	Maluma	
October 22	"Provenza"	Karol G	
October 29	"Provenza"	Karol G	
November 5	"Provenza"	Karol G	
November 12	"Provenza"	Karol G	
November 19	"Provenza"	Karol G	
November 26	"Provenza"	Karol G	
December 3	"Provenza"	Karol G	
December 10	"Mamiii"	Becky G and Karol G	
December 17	"Provenza"	Karol G	
December 24	"Provenza"	Karol G	
December 31	"Provenza"	Karol G	
