= Baraja Bendita =

2026 studio album by Becky G

Studio album by Becky G
- Released: August 14, 2026
- Length: 47:39
- Languages: English; Spanish
- Label: RCA
- Producers: Botlok; Dylan Brady; C.Ray; Cromo X; Stephanie D'Arcy; Mel DeBarge; Deputy; Elkan; Alex Goldblatt; Dylan Hyde; Shah Major; Juanita Manrique; Mazzarri; Milliano; Polo Parra; Reefa; Kyle Shearer; Take a Daytrip; Sol Was

Becky G chronology
| Encuentros (2024) | Baraja Bendita (2026) |

Singles from Baraja Bendita
- 1. "Marathon" Released: March 27, 2026; 2. "Epa" Released: May 15, 2026; 3. "Patrona" Released: June 25, 2026

Professional ratings
Review scores
| Source | Rating |
|---|---|
| Ratings Game Music | B- |

Baraja Bendita (English: Blessed Deck of Cards) is the fifth studio album by American singer Becky G. It was released on August 14, 2026 through RCA Records, marking her first project to not also be released through Kemosabe Records. The album was crafted as a blend of Gomez's Mexican heritage and her Los Angeles hip-hop roots, becoming her first bilingual project, and first album on CD and vinyl. It was announced alongside the release of the third single "Patrona" on June 25, 2026.

== Background and development ==
While Gomez's past two albums explored Regional Mexican music, Baraja Bendita was created as an "evolution", combining her early rap sound with an "unapologetic" focus on pop. Her team described the project as a "reverse crossover", with Gomez reclaiming her rap roots while "weaving in" her Latin heritage. The new album shows Gomez "embracing every corner of her musical journey". In an interview with Rolling Stone, she explained the album's title, stating:

“In the simplest way for me, most of your life you hear '[Y]ou can’t control the cards you were dealt'. And that’s very true. There’s a lot of things outside of our control. But you can control how you play them, and I think I’ve played a hell of a hand throughout various phases of my career...”

== Music ==
Baraja Bendita is primarily a pop and rap album mixed with Latin music. Gomez herself stated that the album bridges Becky G (the artist) and Rebbeca (her real name) as a "musical symbol of duality, ownership and the freedom to exist fully without contradiction". She demonstrates her "200% identity" (100% American and 100% Mexican) powered by "evolution and baddie energy". The tracks, all belonging to the Latin pop genre, find the singer allowing vulnerability, confidence, instinct and intention to exist together.

The standard edition of Baraja Bendita contains 17 tracks. The album's opening track "5'5" is a high-energy EDM song. The following track, "Cntrl" belongs to the dance/club-pop genres, featuring upbeat, rhythmic production. "+Pretty" is a reggaeton-infused dance song. "Oasis" is a dance-pop track with strong electronic club music influences. "Chula" fuses Kizomba and R&B elements. "Mal Tiempo" is a merengue song, while "Factos" belongs to Latin pop, the album's main genre. "TQM/ILY" fuses this genre with urban hip-hop music. "Unsend" features an upbeat, club-oriented sound. "Bandera Blanca" is a reggae track. "Perreo Triste" belongs to the reggaeton genre. "Automático" falls primarily into the reggae, and urban pop genres, blending bilingual lyrics with an upbeat, rhythmic electronic and dance-pop production. "Epa" blends elements of electronic music, dance-pop, latin hip-hop, guaracha, and urbano music. "2AM" spans the urban and dance-pop genres. "Marathon" is a pop song that blends elements of hip-hop and electropop. "Glitch" falls under the rap genre. "Patrona" is a latin urban track that blends electronic rhythms, club-pop, and reggaeton with English and Spanish rap verses.

The bonus track included on the vinyl version, "Te Va a Doler" falls under the bachata genre.

== Singles ==
On March 27, 2026, Gomez released the lead single "Marathon", a collaboration with British music producer Elkan. On May 15, she released "Epa" as the second single. On June 25, she released the third single, titled "Patrona".

== Accolades ==
Awards and nominations for "Baraja Bendita"
| Organization | Year | Category | Result | Ref. |
|---|---|---|---|---|
| Billboard Latin Music Awards | 2026 | Latin Pop Album of the Year | Nominated | |

== Commercial performance ==
The album debuted at number twelve on the Top Latin Albums, top five on the Latin Pop Albums, and top ten on the Latin Rhythm Albums with 7,000 equivalent album units earned in the US on the tracking week ending August 20, according to Luminate. Of that batch, streaming activity contributed 5,000 units — equal to 4.6 million official on-demand clicks of the album's songs. Traditional album sales accounted for 3,000 units, while a negligible amount of activity derived from track-equivalent sales.

== Track listing ==
Baraja Bendita track listing
| No. | Title | Writer(s) | Producer(s) | Length |
|---|---|---|---|---|
| 1. | "5'5" | Rebbeca Gomez; Rachel Keen; Sara Schell; Kyle Shearer | Shearer; Carlos A. Molina^{[v]} | 3:11 |
| 2. | "Cntrl" | Gomez; Nathaniel Campany; Jamil Pierre; Schell | Deputy; Molina^{[v]} | 2:36 |
| 3. | "+Pretty" | Gomez; Dylan Brady; Campany; Schell; Sol Was | Brady; Was; Molina^{[v]} | 2:17 |
| 4. | "Oasis" | Gomez; Pierre; Schell; Kirsten Spencer | Deputy; Molina^{[v]} | 3:11 |
| 5. | "Chula" | Gomez; Manuel Lorente Freire; Daniel Rondón; Elvin Roubert-Rodriguez; Schell | Botlok; Molina^{[v]} | 2:07 |
| 6. | "Mal Tiempo" | Gomez; Denzel Baptiste; David Biral; Campany; Mel DeBarge; Polo Parra; Schell; Martin Vincente | Cromo X; DeBarge; Polo Parra; Take a Daytrip; Molina^{[v]} | 3:01 |
| 7. | "Factos" | Gomez; Lorente; Hector Mazzarri; Jorge Milliano; Rondón | Mazzarri; Milliano; Molina^{[v]} | 2:58 |
| 8. | "TQM/ILY" | Gomez; Campany; Pierre; Schell | Deputy; Molina^{[v]} | 2:32 |
| 9. | "Unsend" | Gomez; Adrés Correa Rios; Lorente; Mazzarri; Milliano; Rondón | Mazzarri; Milliano; Molina^{[v]} | 2:41 |
| 10. | "Bandera Blanca" | Gomez; Lorente; Carlos A. Molina; Rondón; Roubert-Rodriguez; Schell | Botlok; Juanita Manrique; Molina^{[v]} | 3:04 |
| 11. | "Perreo Triste" | Gomez; Lorente; Rondón; Roubert-Rodriguez; Schell | Botlok; Molina^{[v]} | 2:53 |
| 12. | "Automático" | Gomez; Campany; Alex Goldblatt; Pierre; Schell | Deputy; Goldblatt | 2:53 |
| 13. | "Epa" | Gomez; Campany; Pierre; Spencer; Schell | Deputy; Molina^{[v]} | 3:22 |
| 14. | "2AM" | Gomez; Campany; Dylan Hyde; Shah Major; Pierre; Reefa; Steve Sudduth; František Šulc | Deputy; Hyde; Major; Reefa; Molina^{[v]} | 3:22 |
| 15. | "Marathon" (with Elkan) | Gomez; Elkan; Sian Emeh; Schell; Kavin Smith | Elkan; Molina^{[v]} | 2:51 |
| 16. | "Glitch" | Gomez; Akil King; Pierre; Schell; Spencer; Christopher Wray | C.Wray; Deputy; Molina^{[v]} | 1:56 |
| 17. | "Patrona" | Gomez; Pierre; Schell; Spencer | Stephanie D'Arcy; Deputy; Manrique; Molina^{[v]} | 2:44 |
| Total length: | | | | 47:39 |

Physical edition hidden track
| No. | Title | Writer(s) | Length |
|---|---|---|---|
| 18. | "Te Va Doler" | Gomez | 2:26 |
| Total length: | | | 50:05 |

=== Notes ===
- ^{^[v]} denotes a vocal producer.
- All track titles are stylized in all caps.

== Personnel ==
Credits are adapted from Tidal.

=== Musicians ===
- Becky G – performance (all tracks), background vocals (track 6)
- Sara Schell – background vocals (1, 3)
- Kyle Shearer – bass, drum machine, programming, synthesizer (1)
- Deputy – bass, drums, keyboards (2, 4, 8, 12–14, 17); programming (16)
- Misha Ellis – violin (2)
- Dylan Brady – drums, keyboards, programming, synthesizer (3)
- Sol Was – guitar, keyboards, programming, synthesizer (3)
- Botlok – keyboards (5)
- David Biral – bass, drums (6)
- Denzel Baptiste – bass, drums (6)
- Carlos Fría – congas, tambora (6)
- Isaias Leclerc – bass (6)
- Juan Gonzalez – güiro (6)
- Sandy Gabriel – saxophone (6)
- Nathaniel Campany – synthesizer (6)
- Mazzarri – keyboards, synthesizer (7, 9); drums (7)
- Jorge Milliano – keyboards, synthesizer (7, 9); drums (9)
- Chris Mora – guitar (7)
- Daniel Rondón – guitar (9–11)
- Alex Goldblatt – guitar (12)
- Dylan Hyde – bass, keyboards, vocals (14)
- Shah Major – bass, keyboards (14)
- Reefa – drums (14)
- Elkan – bass, drums, flute, guitar, vocals (15)
- Kavin Smith – keyboards (15)
- C.Wray – programming (16)

=== Technical ===
- Carlos A. Molina – engineering
- Dylan Brady – engineering (3)
- Sol Was – engineering (3)
- Oliver van Moon – engineering assistance (2, 6, 7, 9, 13)
- Alexx Nielsen – engineering assistance (2, 11, 13, 14)
- Stephanie D'Arcy – engineering assistance (3–6, 8, 11, 16)
- Rubén Castro – engineering assistance (3)
- Kaelen Russell – engineering assistance (4, 5, 8, 10, 12, 14)
- Kristina Fisk – engineering assistance (7, 12, 16)
- Juanita Manrique – engineering assistance (9)
- Tom Norris – mixing (1–14, 16, 17)
- David Nakaji – mixing (15)
- Victor Verpillat – mixing assistance (1–14, 16, 17)
- Dave Kutch – mastering

== Charts ==
Chart performance for Baraja Bendita
| Chart (2026) | Peak position |
|---|---|
| US Latin Pop Albums (Billboard) | 2 |
| US Latin Rhythm Albums (Billboard) | 7 |
| US Top Album Sales (Billboard) | 38 |
| US Top Latin Albums (Billboard) | 12 |

== Release history ==
Release history for Baraja Bendita
| Region | Date | Format(s) | Label | Ref. |
|---|---|---|---|---|
| Various | August 14, 2026 | CD; LP; digital download; streaming | RCA | |
