= Sorry Papi =

Single by Topic and Becky G
- Language: Spanish
- Released: April 24, 2026
- Length: 2:50
- Label: Topic
- Songwriters: Tobias Topic; Alexander Tidebrink; Rebbeca Marie Gomez; Daniel Ignacio Rondón; Héctor André Mazzarri Ramos; Loris Cimino; Manuel Lorente Freire; Maximilian Riehl; Walter Leon Aguilar
- Producers: Topic; A7S; Late Nine

Topic singles chronology
"Missing Me" (2026)	"Sorry Papi" (2026)	"Right Here, Right Now (Rework)" (2026)

Becky G singles chronology
"Marathon" (2026)	"Sorry Papi" (2026)	"Epa" (2026)

Music video
- "Sorry Papi" on YouTube

"Sorry Papi" is a song recorded by German DJ and music producer Topic and American singer Becky G. It was released by Tobias Topic own imprint Topic Recordings on April 24, 2026.

The song features a prominent interpolation of the 1975 Peruvian cumbia hit "La Colegiala" by Walter León Aguilar.

== Music video ==
The music video was released alongside the song. It was directed by Mats Bohle and Julian Kleinert.

== Accolades ==
Awards and nominations for "Sorry Papi"
Organization	Year	Category	Result	Ref.
1Live Krone Radio Awards	2026	Best Song	Pending	
Premios Juventud	2026	Best Dance Track	Nominated	

== Charts ==
=== Weekly charts ===
Weekly chart performance
Chart (2026)	Peak position
Austria Airplay (IFPI)	11
Belgium (Ultratop 50 Flanders)	16
Belgium (Ultratop 50 Wallonia)	13
Bulgaria Airplay (PROPHON)	5
CIS Airplay (TopHit)	51
Croatia International Airplay (Top lista)	4
Estonia Airplay (TopHit)	24
Germany Airplay (MusicTrace)	6
Germany Dance (GfK)	13
Global Dance Radio (Billboard/WARM)	25
Honduras Anglo Airplay (Monitor Latino)	5
Italy Airplay (EarOne)	76
Moldova Airplay (TopHit)	116
Netherlands (Dutch Top 40)	13
Netherlands (Single Top 100)	95
Netherlands Airplay (Dutch Charts)	17
Nicaragua Anglo Airplay (Monitor Latino)	2
North Macedonia Airplay (Radiomonitor)	7
Poland Airplay (OLiS)	11
Romania Airplay (UPFR)	6
Romania Airplay (Media Forest)	3
Slovakia Airplay (ČNS IFPI)	3
Slovakia Singles Digital (ČNS IFPI)	94
Slovenia Airplay (Radiomonitor)	11
Ukraine Airplay (TopHit)	22
US Hot Latin Pop Songs (Billboard)	16
Venezuela Anglo Airplay (Monitor Latino)	12

=== Monthly charts ===
Monthly chart performance
Chart (2026)	Peak position
CIS Airplay (TopHit)	59
Estonia Airplay (TopHit)	26
Romania Airplay (TopHit)	5
Ukraine Airplay (TopHit)	26
