= Mangú (song) =

2016 single by Becky G

Single by Becky G
- Language: Spanish
- Released: October 7, 2016
- Recorded: 2016
- Genre: Moombahton
- Length: 2:59
- Label: Kemosabe
- Songwriters: Rebbeca Marie Gomez; Steven Dominguez; Vicente Martin Rodriguez
- Producer: A.C.

Becky G singles chronology
"Take It Off" (2016)	"Mangú" (2016)	"Si Una Vez (If I Once)" (2017)

Music video
- "Mangú" on YouTube

"Mangú" is a song by American singer Becky G. It was released on October 7, 2016, through Kemosabe Records as the then-second single from her then forthcoming Spanish debut album. It is the follow-up to her prior single "Sola". The song was later scrapped from the album, which was titled Mala Santa and released in 2019.

== Composition ==
"Mangú" is sung in a Dominican accent, with Gomez silencing the "s" in the middle and end of words. It lyrically speaks of the singer being wanted by a man that thinks she is a "crazy American girl", but Gomez says she's not "one of those". The title comes from a Dominican plate of the same name, as the co-writers are from the Dominican Republic.

== Live performances ==
Gomez premiered the then-unreleased track at Splash Kingdom. She performed the song at the Latin American Music Awards of 2016 on October 6, hours before its release. She later sang "Mangú" during the premiere of the second season of La Banda along with "Sola".

== Music video ==
The music video for the song was also released on October 7. Its premise is a continuation of the story in the video for "Sola". The video sees Gomez and her new friend stopping at a market store and invite the clerk to go with them. They are seen driving and dancing in the red car. A fourth girl appears in the car with them after they go into a house to get clothes. The girls are seen entering a bar and dancing on top of a side table. The clip ends with the girls going to sleep in the car at dawn. The music video has over 73 million views on YouTube as of November 2023.

== Charts ==
Chart (2016)	Peak position
US Hot Latin Songs (Billboard)	47
