= Fulanito (song) =

2021 single by Becky G and El Alfa

Single by Becky G and El Alfa

from the album Esquemas
- Language: Spanish
- Released: June 3, 2021
- Length: 2:38
- Label: Kemosabe
- Songwriters: Rebbeca Gomez; Rafael Rodríguez; Elena Rose; Kyle Shearer; Nate Campany; Alexander Castillo Vasquez; H R Forte; Emanuel Herrera Batista
- Producers: Rafael Rodríguez; Valley Girl; Carlos A. Molina; A.C

Becky G singles chronology
"Ram Pam Pam" (2021)	"Fulanito" (2021)	"Only One" (2021)

El Alfa singles chronology
"Pikete" (2021)	"Fulanito" (2021)	"Vitamina Q" (2021)

Music video
- "Fulanito" on YouTube

"Fulanito" is a song by American singer Becky G and Dominican rapper El Alfa. It was released by Kemosabe Records on June 3, 2021, as the second single from Gomez's second studio album, Esquemas (2022). A dance for the song became viral on the TikTok app.

== Music video ==
The music video was released alongside the song on June 3. The music video was directed by both and shot in Miami, Florida.

== Live performances ==
Becky G and El Alfa performed "Fulanito" together for the first time at the Premios Juventud on July 22, 2021. Gomez performed the song at the Coachella Valley Music and Arts Festival on April 14 and 21, 2023.

== Accolades ==
Awards and nominations for "Fulanito"
Organization	Year	Category	Result	Ref.
Premio Lo Nuestro	2022	Urban Collaboration of the Year	Nominated	
Premios Tu Música Urbano	2022	Urban Tropical Song	Won	

== Charts ==
=== Weekly charts ===
Chart (2021)	Peak position
Argentina Hot 100 (Billboard)	61
Global 200 (Billboard)	140
Global Excl. US (Billboard)	97
Spain (PROMUSICAE)	9
US Hot Latin Songs (Billboard)	24
US Latin Airplay (Billboard)	43
US Latin Pop Airplay (Billboard)	10
US Latin Rhythm Airplay (Billboard)	21
Venezuela (Record Report)	6

=== Year-end charts ===
Chart (2021)	Position
Ecuador (Monitor Latino)	72
El Salvador (Monitor Latino)	61
Guatemala (Monitor Latino)	30
Honduras (Monitor Latino)	99
Nicaragua Urbano (Monitor Latino)	24
Peru (Monitor Latino)	77
Puerto Rico (Monitor Latino)	99
Spain (PROMUSICAE)	42
US Latin Pop Airplay (Billboard)	36
Venezuela (Monitor Latino)	20
Chart (2022)	Position
Guatemala (Monitor Latino)	93
Nicaragua (Monitor Latino)	49
Panama (Monitor Latino)	86

== Certifications ==
Region	Certification	Certified units/sales
Mexico (AMPROFON)	2× Platinum	280,000^{‡}
Spain (Promusicae)	3× Platinum	120,000^{‡}
United States (RIAA)	7× Platinum (Latin)	420,000^{‡}
Streaming
Central America (CFC)	Platinum	7,000,000^{†}
^{‡} Sales+streaming figures based on certification alone.^{†} Streaming-only figures based on certification alone.
