= No Mienten =

2022 single by Becky G

Promotional single by Becky G

from the album Esquemas
- Language: Spanish
- English title: "They Don't Lie"
- Released: April 20, 2022
- Genre: Latin pop; dance-pop
- Length: 2:27
- Label: Kemosabe; RCA
- Songwriters: Rebbeca Gomez; Manuel Lorente Freire; Joaquin Dominguez Santana
- Producer: Juacko

"No Mienten" (stylized in all caps) is a song by American singer Becky G. It was released on April 20, 2022, by Kemosabe and RCA Records, as the only promotional single from her second studio album, Esquemas (2022).

== Composition ==
"No Mienten" is a dance song with elements of Latin pop. It is written in the key of A♭ major, with a moderately fast tempo of 128 beats per minute.

== Charts ==
Weekly chart performance for "No Mienten"
Chart (2022)	Peak position
US Hot Dance/Electronic Songs (Billboard)	20
US Latin Digital Song Sales (Billboard)	7

=== Year-end charts ===
Chart (2022)	Position
Venezuela Pop (Monitor Latino)	64

== Certifications ==
Certifications for "No Mienten"
Region	Certification	Certified units/sales
United States (RIAA)	Gold (Latin)	30,000^{‡}
^{‡} Sales+streaming figures based on certification alone.

== Release history ==
Release history for "No Mienten"
Region	Date	Format	Label(s)	Version	Ref.
Various	April 20, 2022	Digital download; streaming	Kemosabe; RCA	Original	
Various	June 3, 2022	Digital download; streaming	Kemosabe; RCA	Tiësto Remix	
Italy	June 10, 2022	Contemporary hit radio	Sony Latin	Tiësto Remix	
