= Bailé Con Mi Ex =

2022 single by Becky G

Single by Becky G

from the album Esquemas
- Language: Spanish
- English title: "I Danced with My Ex"
- Released: May 10, 2022
- Genre: Disco-pop
- Length: 2:41
- Label: Kemosabe
- Composers: Blake Slatkin; Keegan Bach; Gregory Hein; Andrew Jackson; Mario Caceres; Hector Andre Mazzarri Ramos
- Lyricists: Rebbeca Gomez; Manuel Lorente Freire
- Producers: Blake Slatkin; Mazzarri; KBeaZy

Becky G singles chronology
"Ya Acabó" (2022)	"Bailé Con Mi Ex" (2022)	"La Loto" (2022)

Music video
- "Bailé Con Mi Ex" on YouTube

"Bailé Con Mi Ex" is a song recorded by American singer Becky G. It was released by Kemosabe Records on May 10, 2022, as the fourth and final single from Gomez's second Spanish studio album, Esquemas (2022). It was written by Gomez, Blake Slatkin, Keegan Bach, Manuel Lorente Freire, Gregory Hein, Andrew Jackson, Mario Caceres, Hector Andre Mazzarri Ramos.

== Music video ==
The music video was released on May 13, 2022. It was directed by Pedro Artola. The video features Gomez in an almost-empty house with her boyfriend, interspersed with scenes of them dancing at a club. It has over 20 million views on YouTube as of March 2023.

== Live performances ==
On May 15, 2022, Gomez performed "Bailé Con Mi Ex" on the 2022 Billboard Music Awards, along with "Mamiii". On May 24, 2022, Gomez performed on the Jimmy Kimmel Live!. On April 14 and 21, 2023, Gomez performed the song at the Coachella 2023.

== Critical reception ==
Publication	List	Rank	Ref.
Billboard	The 23 Best Latin Songs So Far: Staff Picks	—N/a	

== Accolades ==
Awards and nominations for "Bailé Con Mi Ex"
Organization	Year	Category	Result	Ref.
Latin American Music Awards	2023	Favorite Pop Song	Nominated	
Lo Nuestro Awards	2023	Urban Dance/Pop Song of the Year	Nominated	
Premios Juventud	2023	Pop Track Of The Year	Won	
WME Awards	2022	Latin Song	Nominated	

== Charts ==
=== Weekly charts ===
Chart (2022)	Peak position
Argentina Hot 100 (Billboard)	49
Argentina (Monitor Latino)	6
Costa Rica (Monitor Latino)	20
Ecuador Pop (Monitor Latino)	13
Guatemala (Monitor Latino)	16
Mexico (Billboard Mexican Airplay)	2
Mexico (Billboard Mexican Espanol Airplay)	1
Panama (Monitor Latino)	16
Panama (PRODUCE)	41
Peru Pop (Monitor Latino)	20
Puerto Rico Pop (Monitor Latino)	7
US Hot Latin Songs (Billboard)	41
US Latin Airplay (Billboard)	1
US Latin Pop Airplay (Billboard)	1
Venezuela Pop (Monitor Latino)	15

=== Year-end charts ===
Chart (2022)	Position
Argentina (Monitor Latino)	14
Bolivia (Monitor Latino)	52
Chile Pop (Monitor Latino)	32
Dominican Republic Pop (Monitor Latino)	19
El Salvador (Monitor Latino)	96
Latin America (Monitor Latino)	64
Panama (Monitor Latino)	68
Puerto Rico Pop (Monitor Latino)	12
Uruguay (Monitor Latino)	76
US Latin Pop Airplay Songs (Billboard)	10
US Latin Airplay Songs (Billboard)	33
Venezuela Pop (Monitor Latino)	46

== Certifications ==
Region	Certification	Certified units/sales
Mexico (AMPROFON)	Gold	70,000^{‡}
United States (RIAA)	Platinum (Latin)	60,000^{‡}
^{‡} Sales+streaming figures based on certification alone.

== See also ==
- List of Billboard Hot Latin Songs and Latin Airplay number ones of 2022
- List of Billboard Latin Pop Airplay number ones of 2022
