= Can't Get Enough (Becky G song) =

2014 single by Becky G featuring Pitbull

Single by Becky G featuring Pitbull

from the EP Play It Again
- Released: March 29, 2014 (English version); May 1, 2014 (Spanish version)
- Recorded: 2013
- Genre: Pop rap; hip hop; dance-pop
- Length: 3:47
- Label: Kemosabe
- Songwriter(s): Rebbeca Marie Gomez; Lukasz Gottwald; Niles Hollowell-Dhar; Max Martin; Armando Christian Pérez; Tzvetin T Todorov; Gregor van Offeren; Urales Vargas; Henry Walter
- Producer(s): Dr. Luke

Becky G singles chronology
| "Quiero Bailar (All Through the Night)" (2013) | "Can't Get Enough" (2014) | "Shower" (2014) |

Pitbull singles chronology
| "Wild Wild Love" (2014) | "Can't Get Enough" (2014) | "We Are One (Ole Ola)" (2014) |

Music video
- "Can't Get Enough" on YouTube

"Can't Get Enough" is a song by American singer Becky G, featuring American rapper Pitbull. It was originally released on July 13, 2013, as the second track from her EP, Play It Again. It was later released as a single to Latin radio on March 29, 2014.

The song was able to chart at number one on the Latin Rhythm Airplay chart in the United States. The music video was then released on June 4, 2014. A Spanish version was released on May 1 to digital platforms; it features Gomez singing in Spanish while Pitbull's verses remain in English.

== Background ==
In an interview with Rolling Stone, Gomez revealed that the single "happened in pieces", as it was originally a solo song. After she wrote the hook, DJ Buddha sent the track to Pitbull, who replied with some verse ideas, which replaced Gomez's second verse and were also included in the Spanish version of the song.

== Music video ==
The official music video for the song was released on Gomez's Vevo channel on YouTube on June 4, 2014. As of September 2024, the music video has over 45 million views.

== Live performances ==
Gomez performed the original version during the 2014 Radio Disney Music Awards (RDMAs).

== Chart performance ==
The song topped the Latin Rhythm Airplay chart on May 29, 2014. The Spanish version entered the top 10 of Billboard's Hot Latin Songs chart, and the original version did the same on the Latin Pop Airplay chart. It also peaked at numbers 2 and 24 on the Latin Airplay and Tropical Airplay charts, respectively.

== Track listing ==
Digital download
| No. | Title | Length |
|---|---|---|
| 1. | "Can't Get Enough" (featuring Pitbull) | 3:47 |

Digital download
| No. | Title | Length |
|---|---|---|
| 1. | "Can't Get Enough – Spanish Version" (featuring Pitbull) | 3:47 |

== Charts ==
| Chart (2014) | Peak position |
|---|---|
| US Hot Latin Songs (Billboard) (Spanish version) | 10 |
| US Latin Pop Airplay (Billboard) | 10 |
| US Latin Airplay (Billboard) | 2 |
| US Latin Rhythm Airplay (Billboard) | 1 |
| US Tropical Airplay (Billboard) | 24 |
