= Take It Off (Lil Jon song) =

Single by Lil Jon featuring Yandel and Becky G
- Released: July 22, 2016
- Recorded: 2016
- Genre: Latin urban
- Length: 4:26
- Label: BME; Universal Republic; Fresh Productions; Kemosabe
- Songwriter(s): Jonathan Smith; Llandel Malavé; Rebbeca Gomez; Emmanuel Anene; Chloe Angelides; Willie Handman; Scott Summers; Justin Quiles; John Roach; Juan Salinas; Oscar Salinas
- Producer(s): Lil Jon; Play-N-Skillz

Lil Jon singles chronology
"Live the Night" (2016)	"Take It Off" (2016)	"Work" (2017)

Yandel singles chronology
"Encantadora" (2015)	"Take It Off" (2016)	"Hey DJ" (2017)

Becky G singles chronology
"Sola" (2016)	"Take It Off" (2016)	"Mangú" (2016)

Music video
- "Take It Off" on YouTube

"Take It Off" is a song by American rapper Lil Jon featuring Puerto Rican singer Yandel and American singer Becky G. The song was released on July 22, 2016.

== Commercial performance ==
"Take It Off" debuted at number 48 on the Billboard Hot Latin Songs chart and peaked at number 45 on October 29, 2016.

== Music video ==
The music video premiered via Lil Jon's Vevo channel on October 4, 2016. It was shot in Las Vegas, Nevada, and directed by Daniel Duran. The music video has over 15 million views as of November 2023.

== Charts ==
Chart (2016)	Peak position
US Hot Latin Songs (Billboard)	45
US Rhythmic (Billboard)	37

== Release history ==
Country	Date	Format	Label
Worldwide	July 22, 2016	Digital download	BME; Sony Latin
