= Play It Again (EP) =

2013 extended play by Becky G

EP by Becky G
- Released: July 13, 2013
- Recorded: 2012–2013
- Genres: Pop; pop rap
- Length: 17:14
- Label: Kemosabe
- Producers: Dr. Luke; Cirkut

Becky G chronology
Play It Again (2013)	Mala Santa (2019)

Singles from Play It Again
- 1. "Can't Get Enough" Released: March 29, 2014

Play It Again is the debut extended play by American singer and rapper Becky G, released for digital download by Kemosabe Records on July 13, 2013.

It was preceded by the promotional singles "Play It Again", released on May 6, 2013, and "Built for This", released on November 6, both with a music video on her YouTube channel. Its official lead single, "Can't Get Enough", was released on March 29, 2014, and features Cuban-American rapper Pitbull.

The EP was recorded in Los Angeles during 2012 and 2013. Dr. Luke served as the album's executive producer with additional production and songwriting by Max Martin, Will.i.am, Pitbull, the JAM and the Cataracs.

== Track listing ==
Play It Again track listing
No.	Title	Writer(s)	Producer(s)	Length
1.	"Play It Again"	Rebbeca Marie Gomez; Lukasz Gottwald; Niles Hollowell-Dhar; Karl Sandberg; Henry Walter; Joshua Coleman	Dr. Luke; Cirkut	3:14
2.	"Can't Get Enough" (featuring Pitbull)	Gomez; Gottwald; Hollowell-Dhar; Sandberg; Armando Perez; Tzvetin Toborov; Gregor van Offeren; Urales Vargas; Walter	Dr. Luke; Cirkut	3:47
3.	"Built for This"	Gomez; Gottwald; Hollowell-Dhar; Walter	Dr. Luke; Cirkut	3:09
4.	"Zoomin' Zoomin'"	Gomez; William Adams; Gottwald; Mathieu Jomphe-Lepine; Walter	Dr. Luke; Cirkut	3:24
5.	"Lovin' What You Do"	Gomez; Gottwald; Michael Mani; Jordan Omley; Walter	Dr. Luke; Cirkut	3:40
Total length:				17:14

== Charts ==
Chart performance for Play It Again
Chart (2013)	Peak position
US Heatseekers Albums (Billboard)	17
