= Ricky Montaner =

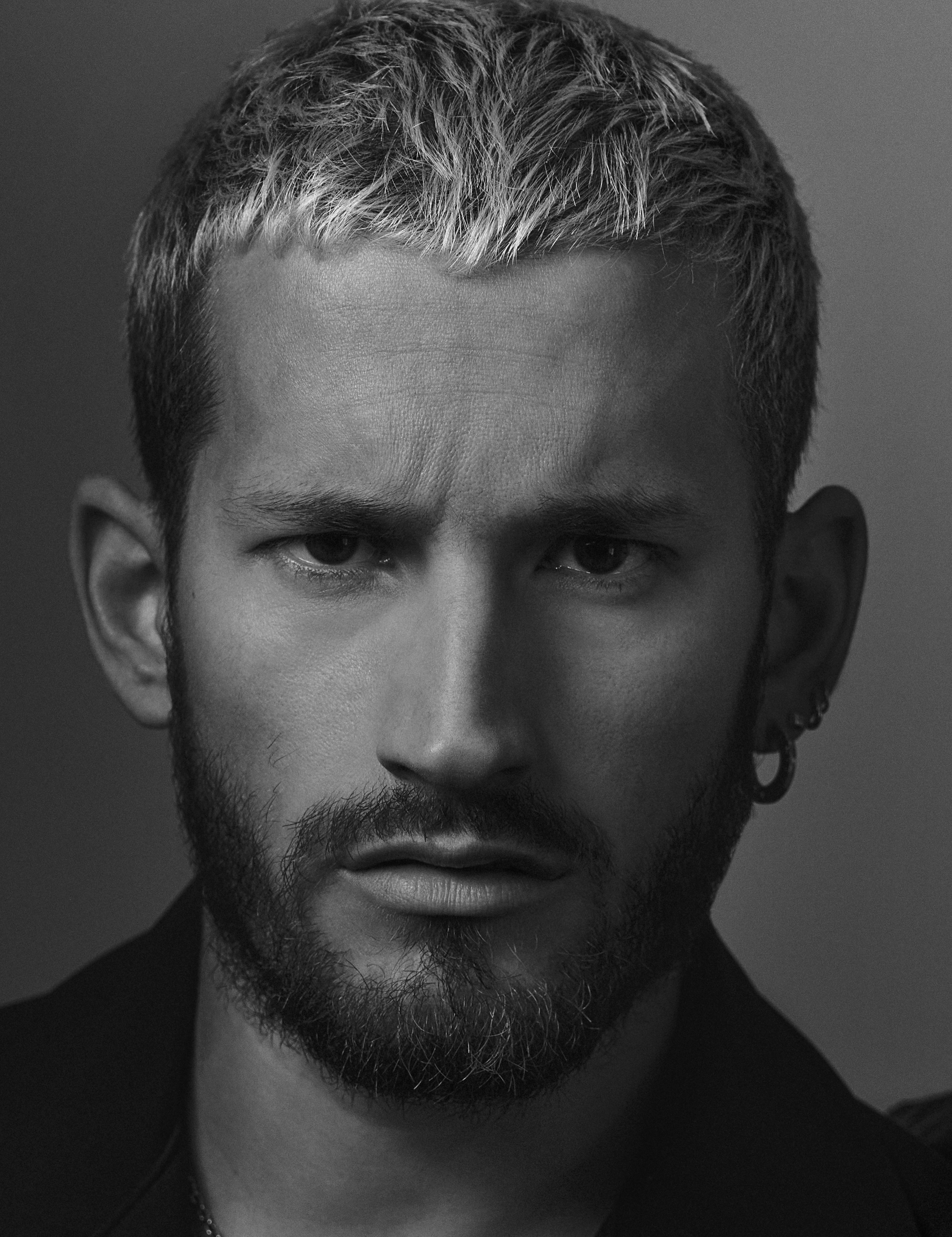

Background information
- Born: November 21, 1990 (age 35)
- Origin: Caracas, Venezuela

Ricardo Andrés Reglero Rodríguez (born November 21, 1990, in Caracas), professionally known as Ricky Montaner, is a Venezuelan singer and songwriter, best known as one half of the musical duo Mau & Ricky, alongside his brother Mau Montaner.

== Biography ==
Ricky is the son of renowned Venezuelan singer Ricardo Montaner. He has made a name for himself in the music industry as a co-writer of songs performed by artists such as Ricky Martin, Becky G, Karol G, Sofía Reyes, Camilo, and Juanes.

Since 2020, he has been in a relationship with Argentine actress, model and presenter Stefanía Roitman, whom he married in January 2022 in Argentina.

== Career ==
At 15 years old, he went on tour across Latin America with his father. Together with his brother Mau, he released their debut album Arte in 2017. That same year, they were nominated for a Latin Grammy Award for Best New Artist. Their breakthrough came with the song "Mi Mala", which earned triple platinum certification by the end of 2018.

In 2021, he and his brother joined the judging panel of the third season of the television show La Voz Argentina, alongside their father Ricardo Montaner, Lali Espósito, and Soledad Pastorutti, with Marley as the host.

In 2022, a docu-reality series about their family, Los Montaner, premiered on Disney+. The show offers a glimpse into their personal lives, daily routines, and conflicts, aiming to show how the family members balance their careers with their personal and family lives. The series features his parents, siblings, wife, sister-in-law Sara Escobar, and brother-in-law Camilo.
