= Break a Sweat =

2015 single by Becky G

Single by Becky G
- Released: August 21, 2015
- Genre: Dance-pop
- Length: 3:28
- Label: Kemosabe; RCA
- Songwriters: Lukasz Gottwald; Emily Warren; Henry Walter; Jacob Kasher Hindlin; Gamal Lewis; Chloe Angelides
- Producers: Dr. Luke; Cirkut

Becky G singles chronology
"Lovin' So Hard" (2015)	"Break a Sweat" (2015)	"Sola" (2016)

Music video
- "Break a Sweat" on YouTube

"Break a Sweat" is a song by American singer Becky G. It was released on August 21, 2015. An accompanying music video was released onto Gomez's official Vevo account on October 9, 2015.

== Background and release ==
"Break a Sweat" was originally intended for American singer Demi Lovato. Lovato reportedly "stormed off" from the studio after an argument with Dr. Luke, who later offered the song to Gomez. It was released for digital download on August 20, 2015. The audio for the song was uploaded to YouTube and Vevo, on the same day of its release. A lyric video was uploaded onto Gomez's official Vevo account on September 4, 2015.

== Music video ==
The music video for "Break a Sweat" was released on October 9, 2015, via Vevo, and was also uploaded to YouTube the same day. The video included product placement for brands such as CoverGirl and Beats Electronics. As of September 2024, the video has gathered over 51 million views.

== Charts ==
Chart (2015)	Peak position
Belgium (Ultratip Bubbling Under Flanders)	67
Czech Republic Singles Digital (ČNS IFPI)	82
Slovakia Singles Digital (ČNS IFPI)	84
US Pop Airplay (Billboard)	36

== Accolades ==
Year	Award	Category	Work	Result
2016	Radio Disney Music Awards	Best Song to Dance To	"Break a Sweat"	Nominated
2016	Teen Choice Awards	Choice Music: Party Song	"Break a Sweat"	Nominated

== Release history ==
Region	Date	Format	Label
United States	August 20, 2015	Digital download	Kemosabe • RCA
