= Esquemas =

Studio album by Becky G
- Released: May 13, 2022
- Recorded: 2020–2021
- Length: 48:48
- Language: Spanish
- Labels: Kemosabe; RCA
- Producers: A.C; Blake Slatkin; Brasa; Di Genius; Édgar Barrera; Juacko; Juanjo Monserrat; KBeaZy; Kuinvi; Luny Tunes; Mazzari; Ovy on the Drums; Rafael Pina; Rafael Rodríguez; Skylar Mones; Supa Dups; Valley Girl; YannC El Armónico

Becky G chronology
Mala Santa (2019)	Esquemas (2022)	Esquinas (2023)

Singles from Esquemas
- 1. "Ram Pam Pam" Released: April 20, 2021; 2. "Fulanito" Released: June 3, 2021; 3. "Mamiii" Released: February 10, 2022; 4. "Bailé Con Mi Ex" Released: May 10, 2022

Esquemas (English: Schemes) is the second studio album by American singer Becky G. It was released on May 13, 2022, through Kemosabe and RCA Records. It is Gomez's first album in three years, after Mala Santa (2019). Esquemas is primarily a Latin and pop album, focusing more on dance-pop and R&B sounds.

== Background ==
Gomez first announced the album through Instagram by unveiling the album's cover art and title just hours after the album's promotional single "No Mienten" was released.

Gomez started sharing snippets of songs after the album was announced including the songs "Tajín" with Puerto Rican rapper Guaynaa, "Kill Bill" and the album's fifth single "Bailé Con Mi Ex".

The song titles for the album's tracklist were unveiled on May 5, 2022, and the official tracklist was unveiled on May 9, 2022. It revealed that the album has new collaborations with Guaynaa and Elena Rose, and the previously released collaborations with El Alfa, Natti Natasha and Karol G.

== Singles ==
On April 20, 2021, Gomez and Natti Natasha released their second collaboration and third song together "Ram Pam Pam" as a single for both of their second studio albums.

On June 3, 2021, Gomez collaborated with El Alfa on the song "Fulanito", released as the second single from the album. A dance for the song became viral on the app TikTok.

On February 10, 2022, Gomez collaborated with Karol G on the song "Mamiii", released as the third single from the album. The song became both their highest-charting song on the Billboard Hot 100.

"No Mienten" was released on April 20, 2022, as the album's promotional single.

"Bailé Con Mi Ex" was released on May 10, 2022, as the album's fourth single.

== Critical reception ==
Professional ratings
Review scores
Source	Rating
AllMusic	4/5 stars
Rolling Stone	4/5 stars

=== Year-end lists ===
Year-end lists
Publication	List	Rank	Ref.
Billboard	The 50 Best Albums	45	
Billboard	The 22 Best Latin Albums	—N/a	
Rolling Stone	The 100 Best Albums	69	
UPROXX	The Best Latin Albums	—N/a	
Variety	The 10 Best Latin Albums	7	

== Accolades ==
Awards and nominations for "Esquemas"
Organization	Year	Category	Result	Ref.
Billboard Latin Music Awards	2022	Latin Pop Album of the Year	Nominated	
Latin American Music Awards	2023	Album of the Year	Nominated	
Latin American Music Awards	2023	Best Album – Pop	Nominated	
Lo Nuestro Awards	2023	Album of the Year	Nominated	
Lo Nuestro Awards	2023	Urban Album of the Year	Nominated	
Los 40 Music Awards	2022	Best Album	Nominated	
Premios Juventud	2023	Best Female Urban Album	Nominated	
Premios Tu Música Urbano	2023	Best Female Album	Nominated	
RIAA Gold & Platinum Awards	2022	Top Latin Album	Won	

== Commercial performance ==
Esquemas debuted at number 92 on the US Billboard 200, including number 5 on the Top Latin Albums and number 1 on the Latin Pop Albums chart with 11,000 album equivalent units.

== Track listing ==
Esquemas track listing
No.	Title	Lyrics	Music	Producer(s)	Length
1.	"Buen Día"	Rebbeca Gomez; Manuel Lorente Freire	Skylar Mones; Ernie Isley; Christopher Jasper; Rudolph Isley; Ronald Isley; Marvin Isley; O'Kelly Isley	Skylar Mones	3:38
2.	"Fulanito" (with El Alfa)	Gomez; Elena Rose; Emanuel Herrera Batista	Rafael Rodríguez; Kyle Shearer; Nate Campany; Alexander Castillo Vasquez	Rafael Rodríguez; Valley Girl; Carlos A. Molina; A.C	3:38
3.	"Tajin" (with Guaynaa)	Gomez; Valentina López; Rose; Jean Carlos Santiago Pérez	Dwayne Chin-Quee; Édgar Barrera; Pikani	Kuinvi; SupaDups; Edgar Barrera	2:54
4.	"Flashback" (featuring Elena Rose)	Rose; Gomez	Stephen McGregor; Lorente Freire	Di Genius	3:25
5.	"Bailé Con Mi Ex"	Gomez; Manuel Lorente-Freire	Andrew Jackson; Greg Heinn; Keegan Bach; Mazzari; Blake Slatkin	Mazzarri; KBeaZy	2:41
6.	"Dolores"	Gomez; López; Rose	Pikani; Chin-Quee	Kuinvi; SupaDups	3:19
7.	"Una Más"	Gomez; Lorente Freire	McGregor; Joan Josep Monserrat Riutort; Campany	Di Genius; Juanjo Monserrat	2:07
8.	"Borracha"	Gomez; López; Rose	Chin-Quee; Pikani	Kuinvi; SupaDups	2:37
9.	"Kill Bill"	Gomez; López; Rose	Chin-Quee; Pikani	Kuinvi; SupaDups	3:01
10.	"Que Le Muerda"	Gomez; López; Rose	Chin-Quee; Pikani	Kuinvi; SupaDups	2:40
11.	"Guapa"	Gomez; López; Rose	Chin-Quee; Pikani; Lorente Freire	Kuinvi; SupaDups	3:19
12.	"Ram Pam Pam" (with Natti Natasha)	Gomez; Rose; Natalia Gutiérrez	Francisco Saldaña; Jean Carlos Hernández Espinal; Rafael Pina; Ovimael Maldonado Burgos; Nino Karlo Segarra; Ramón Ayala; Justin Quiles; Siggy Vázquez; Juan Manuel Frias; López	Jean Carlos Hernández Espinal; Rafael Pina	3:22
13.	"No Mienten"	Gomez; Lorente-Freire	Joaquin Dominguez Santana	Juacko	2:29
14.	"Mamiii" (with Karol G)	Gomez; Rose; Carolina Giraldo Navarro	Daniel Echavarría Oviedo; Quiles; Luis Miguel Gomez Castaño; Daniel Uribe	Ovy on the Drums	3:46
Total length:					48:48

=== Notes ===
- "Buen Día" samples "That Lady" by The Isley Brothers.

== Charts ==
=== Weekly charts ===
Chart performance for Esquemas
Chart (2022)	Peak position
Spanish Albums (Promusicae)	28
US Billboard 200	92
US Top Latin Albums (Billboard)	5
US Latin Pop Albums (Billboard)	1

=== Year-end charts ===
Year-end chart performance for Esquemas
Chart (2022)	Position
US Top Latin Albums (Billboard)	30

Year-end chart performance for Esquemas
Chart (2023)	Position
US Top Latin Albums (Billboard)	49

== Certifications ==
Certifications for Esquemas
Region	Certification	Certified units/sales
Mexico (AMPROFON)	Platinum	140,000^{‡}
United States (RIAA)	3× Platinum (Latin)	180,000^{‡}
^{‡} Sales+streaming figures based on certification alone.

== Release history ==
Release history and formats for Esquemas
Region	Date	Format	Label	Ref.
Various	May 13, 2022	digital download; streaming	Kemosabe; RCA	
