= Epa (Becky G song) =

Single by Becky G

from the album Baraja Bendita
- Language: English; Spanish
- Released: May 15, 2026
- Length: 3:23
- Label: Kemosabe; RCA; Sony Latin
- Songwriters: Rebbeca Marie Gomez; Jamil M. Pierre; Kirsten Allyssa Spencer; Nathaniel Campany; Sara Schell
- Producer: Deputy

Becky G singles chronology
"Sorry Papi" (2026)	"Epa" (2026)	"Mi Gran Amor" (2026)

Music video
- "Epa" on YouTube

"Epa" (stylized in all caps) is a song by American singer Becky G. It was released by Kemosabe, RCA Records, and Sony Latin on May 15, 2026, as the second single from her fifth studio album, Baraja Bendita. The song is performed in both Spanish and English and blends elements of electronic and urbano music.

== Music video ==
The music video was released alongside the song. It was directed by Dominican filmmaker Olivia De Camps, choreographed by Tyrik J. Patterson and filmed at El Mercadito, a market in the Boyle Heights neighborhood in Los Angeles. It features a cameo by drag queen Valentina and shows Gomez in different settings as she performs choreographed dance moves. The video starts with several people in different places while Gomez sets a yoga mat in an outdoor setting. Valentina, on stage at a Mexican restaurant, lip syncs the song's intro as the people start dancing, followed by Gomez after she clicks a Bose speaker. During the pre-chorus, she is seen walking down the market while bystanders look at her, and sitting by a large table with people next to her dancing. In the second verse, Gomez is seen laying on top of a bed of ice and dancing against a wall. All the scenes are interspersed as the song continues, with Gomez now dancing at the restaurant with others. During the instrumental break, she uses a sledgehammer to break the ice bed, as a form of protest to the United States Immigration and Customs Enforcement (ICE). In the final chorus, she is helped on top of another table and performs choreography surrounded by dancers. The video ends with the credits displayed as clips of people play in the background.

== Charts ==
Chart (2026)	Peak position
Bolivia Airplay (Monitor Latino)	12
Nigeria Airplay (TurnTable)	57
US Hot Latin Rhythm Songs (Billboard)	17
US Hot Latin Songs (Billboard)	47
US Latin Digital Song Sales (Billboard)	2

== Release history ==
Release dates and formats for "Epa"
Region	Date	Format	Label	Ref.
Various	May 15, 2026	Digital download; streaming	RCA	Kemosabe; RCA; Sony Latin
