= Reefa =

American record producer

- Born: Sharif Slater; Brownsville, Brooklyn, New York, U.S.
- Origin: Brooklyn, New York City, New York, U.S.
- Genres: Hip hop
- Occupation: Producer
- Website: www.reefamusic.com

Sharif Emil Slater, known professionally as Reefa, is a music producer. He was raised in Brownsville, Brooklyn.

== Career ==
Sharif "Reefa" Slater has produced for Lil Wayne, Estelle, The Game, Rick Ross, Troy Ave, Maino, Fabolous, Ludacris, Juelz Santana, French Montana, Gucci Mane, Omarion, Beanie Sigel, Red Cafe, Super Junior and The Notorious B.I.G. He produced "It's Okay (One Blood)" by The Game, and he also produced two Billboard #1 albums released by Miami Rapper, Rick Ross, namely "God Forgives, I Don't", and "Mastermind."

In 2014, Reefa co-produced with Irv Gotti, Myles William and 12Keyz, a remake of the Notorious B.I.G. song "Mo Money Mo Problems" for "The Other Woman" soundtrack movie with Cameron Diaz, Kate Upton and Nicki Minaj. The song has vocals by both Iggy Azalea and Keyshia Cole. He scored music for T.I.'s VH1 reality show T.I. & Tiny: The Family Hustle." Slater's production house company employed Jaymond Watkins, who appeared on The Ellen De Generes show."

== Awards and nominations ==
=== Grammy Awards ===
The Grammy Awards are awarded annually by the National Academy of Recording Arts and Sciences.

Year	Nominee / Work	Award	Result
2012	"God Forgives I Don't" - (Rick Ross)	Best Rap Album	Nominated
2015	Estelle ft. Jussie Smollett - "Conqueror"	Best Compilation Soundtrack for Visual Media	Nominated

== Production Discography ==
- Lola Brooke - “Gator Season” (2022)
- Lola Brooke - “Here I Come” (2022)
- Lola Brooke - “Back To Business” (2020)
- Lola Brooke - “My Bop” (2020)
- Lola Brooke - “Shittin Me” (2019)
- Lola Brooke - “Options” (2019)
- Lobby Boyz Ft Benny the Butcher “Praying” (2022)
- French Montana Ft Fivio Foreign “Panicking” (2021)
- Symba - “Reality Is” (2021)
- Symba Ft Moneybagg Yo x O.T. Genasis x Too $hort x Justinlaboy - “Follow Me” (2021)
- JustinLaboy "Respectfully" (2021)
- Stunna Girl Ft 42 Dugg "Ratch" (2021)
- Stunna Girl "Rotation" (2020)
- Stunna Girl "Like I Said Tho" (2021)
- Stunna Girl "Still Smoke" (2021)
- Stunna Girl "Cant Choose" (2021)
- Stunna Girl "Stunna This Stunna That" (2021)
- Lil Wayne - "Let It All Work Out" (2018)
- Lil Wayne - "Murda" ft Junior Reid x Cory Gunz x Capo (2021)
- Estelle Ft Alicai Harley - "Slow Down" (2018)
- Estelle Ft Hood Celebrity - "Karma" (2018) - co-produced by 12Keyz
- Jay Watts - "Single Friends" (2017) - co-produced by 12Keyz
- Lenny Grant AKA Uncle Murda Ft 50 Cent x Jeremih - "On & On" (2017) - co-produced by 12Keyz
- PnB Rock Ft Ty Dolla Sign - "Hanging Up My Jersey" (2017) - co-produced by 12Keyz
- Uncle Murda - "Rap Up 2016" -co-produced by Teddy Da Don
- Uncle Murda Ft Young M.A x Dios Moreno - "Thot" (2016)
- Alessia Cara - "I'm Yours" Original Version (2016) - co-produced by 12Keyz
- Manolo Rose - "Wallahi" (2016)
- Jay Watts - "Thats Not Me" (2016) - co-produced by 12Keyz x Myles William x Adrian Melendez
- Jay Watts - "IDGAF" (2016) - co-produced by 12Keyz x Paul Ruess
- Uncle Murda - "Rap Up" (2015)
- Jay Watts - "How You Feel" - co-produced by 12Keyz x Paul Ruess
- Lil Wayne Ft Cory Gunz x Capo - "Murda" Free Weezy Album- (2015) co-produced by Myles William x 12Keyz
- Uncle Murda x Young Greatness musician - "Real Is Back" - (2015) co-produced by Myles William x JayAreOnTheBeat
- Estelle musician - "She Will Love" - (2015)
- Estelle musician - "Not Sure" - (2015) co-produced by 12Keyz x Myles William
- Estelle musician - "Conqueror" - (2015) co-produced by Johnny Black
- Rayven Justice "Dont Trust Em" ft Chinx x Uncle Murda - (2015) co-produced by 12Keyz
- Rayven Justice "Nobody" - (2015) co-produced by Myles William
- Maino X Mack Wilds - "All About You" (2014) co-produced by 12Keyz
- Maino K.O.B King Of Brooklyn Album (2013) ("K.O.B (Rules To This Shit)
- Maino K.O.B King Of Brooklyn Album (2013) "Plottin"
- Maino K.O.B King Of Brooklyn Album (2013) "Bang"
- Maino K.O.B King Of Brooklyn Album (2013) "Great"
- Maino K.O.B King Of Brooklyn Album (2013) "Just Watch"
- The Other Woman - Movie Soundtrack (2014) "I'm Coming Out" featuring Keyshia Cole & Iggy Azalea - co-produced by Irv Gotti, Myles William and 12Keyz
- Rick Ross - Mastermind (2014) (09. "What A Shame" featuring French Montana - co produced by Stats)
- Ashanti - Braveheart (2014) (02. "Nowhere" co-produced by 12Keyz, 03. "Runaway" co-produced by 12Keyz)
- French Montana - Excuse My French (2013) (01. "Once In A While" co-produced by 12Keyz, 12. "We Go Wherever We Want" co-produced by 12Keyz, Vinylz and Allen Ritter, 19. "If I Die" co-produced by 12Keyz)
- Troy Ave - New York City - The Album (2013) 17. "I'm Dat N#gga" co-produced by Myles William and Stats
- Chinx - Arm & Dangerous" - (2013) Co-produced by Myles William
- Ky-mani Marley - Love Over All" - (2015)
- Ja Rule - Fresh Out Da Pen" - (2013) co-produced by Myles William, 12Keyz and Irv Gotti
- Ja Rule - Everything" - (2013) co-produced by Myles William and Irv Gotti
- Rick Ross - God Forgives, I Don't (2012) 12. "Ice Cold" featuring Omarion
- Styles P - Master of Ceremonies (2011) 11. "Don't Turn Away" Featuring Pharrell
- Super Junior - "Walkin" (2011) Fifth Studio Album
- Red Cafe - (2009) "Hottest in the Hood"
- Red Cafe - (2006) "Diddy Bop"
- Red Cafe - (2005) "Bling Blaouw"
- Willy Northpole - "Tha Connect" (2009)
- Willy Northpole - "The Story" (2009)
- Willy Northpole - "Dear Lord" (2009)
- Fabolous - From Nothin' to Something (2007)
- Fabolous "Gangsta Don't Play" featuring Junior Reid(2007)
- Fabolous "I'm The Man" featuring Red Cafe (2007)
- Gucci Mane - Back To The Trap House (2007) 02. "16 Fever"
- Beanie Sigel - "Gutted" Featuring Jay Z (2007)
- Beanie Sigel - "Creep Low" (2007)
- Beanie Sigel - "The Bridge" Featuring Scarface x Raheem DeVaughn (2007)
- The Game - Doctor's Advocate (2006) 03. "It's Okay (One Blood" featuring Junior Reid
- Juelz Santana - What the Game's Been Missing (2005) 18. "I Am Crack"
- The Notorious B.I.G. - Duets: The Final Chapter (2005) 14. "Hustler's Story" featuring Scarface & Akon
- Benzino Ft 2Pac & Freddie Foxxx “Trying To Make It Through” (2005) Archnemsis
- Capone - Pain, Time and Glory (2005) 14. "F*#k Yo Set"
- Coach Carter - Movie Soundtrack (2005) "Why I Love You" performed by Shells
- Fabolous "Do the Damn Thing" featuring Jeezy (2004)
- Fabolous "Holla at Somebody Real" featuring Lil Mo (2004)
