= Can't Stop Dancin' (Becky G song) =

2014 single by Becky G

Single by Becky G
- Released: November 4, 2014
- Recorded: 2014
- Genre: Latin pop; dance-pop
- Length: 3:18
- Label: Kemosabe; RCA
- Songwriters: Rebbeca Marie Gomez; Alexander Castillo Vasquez; Lukasz Gottwald; Theron Thomas; Cirkut
- Producers: Dr. Luke; Cirkut

Becky G singles chronology
| "Shower" (2014) | "Can't Stop Dancin'" (2014) | "Como Tú No Hay Dos" (2015) |

Music video
- "Official Music Video" on YouTube

"Can't Stop Dancin'" is a song by American singer Becky G. It was released on November 4, 2014, by Kemosabe and RCA Records. An accompanying music video was released onto Gomez's official Vevo account on December 3, 2014. A remix by producer A.C. was released on February 12, 2015, followed by a remix featuring Colombian singer J Balvin, released on March 3.

== Background and release ==
"Can't Stop Dancin'" was released for retail via digital distribution, on November 4, 2014. The lyric video for the song was also uploaded to YouTube and VEVO, on the same day of its release, with a cameo appearance by American singer Katy Perry, as it consists of behind-the-scenes footage of Gomez while she was the opening act for Perry's Prismatic World Tour.

== Composition ==
"Can't Stop Dancin'" is written in the key of G minor and rides a moderate half-time groove of 100 beats per minute. While the melody follows the sequence Gm - E♭ - B♭ as its chord progression, Gomez's vocals span from the low tone of F3 to the high tone of B♭4.

== Music video ==
The video was released on December 2, 2014, via VEVO, being uploaded to YouTube the following day. It has over 212 million views as of September 2024.

The visual sees Gomez arriving at a club with her friends and later doing a choreographed dance with two male dancers. These scenes are spliced with shots of her outside of several places, such as a house and some stairs. Gomez also performs the song in front of a light-cyan wall as well as inside a room with a bed, a chair, and a TV.

== Commercial performance ==
"Can't Stop Dancin'" debuted at number 98 on the US Billboard Hot 100 chart and number 40 on the Billboard Pop Songs on the week dated for January 10, 2015. The song dropped out of the Billboard Hot 100 chart the next week. On the chart week dated for February 7, 2015, the song re-entered at number 95 and then peaked at number 88, becoming its succeeding week.

== Track listing ==
Digital download
| No. | Title | Length |
|---|---|---|
| 1. | "Can't Stop Dancin'" | 3:18 |

Digital Download
| No. | Title | Length |
|---|---|---|
| 1. | "Can't Stop Dancin'" (J Balvin remix) | 3:17 |

Digital download
| No. | Title | Length |
|---|---|---|
| 1. | "Can't Stop Dancin' - A.C Remix" | 4:08 |

== Charts ==
| Chart (2014–15) | Peak position |
|---|---|
| Czech Republic Singles Digital (ČNS IFPI) | 45 |
| Finland (Suomen virallinen radiolista) | 86 |
| Netherlands (Dutch Tipparade) | 1 |
| Slovakia Singles Digital (ČNS IFPI) | 36 |
| Sweden (Sverigetopplistan) | 95 |
| Sweden Heatseekers (Sverigetopplistan) | 1 |
| US Billboard Hot 100 | 88 |
| US Pop Airplay (Billboard) | 34 |
| US Pop Digital Songs (Billboard) | 34 |
| US (Monitor Latino) | 10 |

== Certifications ==
| Region | Certification | Certified units/sales |
|---|---|---|
| Norway (IFPI Norway) | Platinum | 60,000^{‡} |
| United States (RIAA) | Platinum | 1,000,000^{‡} |
^{‡} Sales+streaming figures based on certification alone.
