= Mala Santa =

2019 studio album by Becky G

Studio album by Becky G
- Released: October 17, 2019
- Recorded: February 2017 – July 2019
- Genres: Reggaeton; Latin pop; Latin hip-hop
- Length: 52:49
- Language: Spanish
- Label: Kemosabe
- Producers: DJ Luian; Mambo Kingz; Dave Kutch; Hydro; Dímelo Flow; Jon Leone

Becky G chronology
Play It Again (2013)	Mala Santa (2019)	Esquemas (2022)

Singles from Mala Santa
- 1. "Mayores" Released: July 14, 2017; 2. "Sin Pijama" Released: April 20, 2018; 3. "Cuando Te Besé" Released: August 2, 2018; 4. "Dollar" Released: July 10, 2019; 5. "Mala Santa" Released: October 11, 2019

Mala Santa (transl. Bad Saint) is the debut studio album by American singer Becky G. It was released on October 17, 2019, by Kemosabe Records. Mala Santa is a Latin pop and reggaeton record, incorporating elements of Latin hip-hop and urbano.

== Background ==
Since being signed to a joint-deal with Kemosabe and RCA Records in late 2011, Gomez began work on her then-English debut album. After collaborations with Australian singer Cody Simpson, British singer Cher Lloyd, and American rapper will.i.am in 2012, Gomez released her official debut single "Becky from the Block" (a cover of American singer-actress Jennifer Lopez's song "Jenny from the Block"), followed by her pop rap debut extended play Play It Again in July 2013. In April 2014, Gomez began releasing singles (including her first hit "Shower") from her pop English debut album, which was to be released either later that year, or sometime in 2015. In April 2016, in an interview with Teen Vogue, Gomez first spoke about the possibility of releasing an album. However, it was not until 2019 that she went forward with the project. On March 22, 2019, it was reported that the singer was working on two studio albums simultaneously, one to be released in English and the other one in Spanish. As of March 2019, it was unclear if any of the songs she had released up until this point would appear on a future album. In July, she stated that her album was expected to be released later that year. On October 8, 2019, Gomez took to social media to reveal the release date and the cover art of her upcoming debut studio album. The album became available for pre-order on October 11, 2019.

== Accolades ==
Awards and nominations for "Mala Santa"
Organization	Year	Category	Result	Ref.
Premios Tu Música Urbano	2020	Best Female Album	Nominated	

== Commercial performance ==
The album debuted at number 85 on the US Billboard 200, including number 3 on the Top Latin Albums and number 3 on the Latin Rhythm Albums charts with first week sales of 8,000.

== Track listing ==
Track listing adapted from Apple Music.

No.	Title	Lyrics	Music	Producer(s)	Length
1.	"Mala Santa"	Rebbeca Gomez; Pablo C. Fuentes; Kedin Maisonet	Luian Malavé Nieves; Xavier Semper; Edgar Semper	DJ Luian; Mambo Kingz	2:53
2.	"Dollar" (with Myke Towers)	Gomez; Michael Anthony Torres Monge; Andrea Elena Mangiamarchi	Luian; X. Semper; E. Semper; Nate Campany; Rafa Rodriquez	Dave Kutch; DJ Luian; Mambo Kingz; Hydro	3:24
3.	"24/7"	Gomez; Fuentes; Maisonet	X. Semper; E. Semper; Rodriquez; Patrick Ingunza; Campany; Luian; Ramos; Rondon	DJ Luian; Mambo Kingz; Hydro	2:45
4.	"Si Si"	Gomez; Maisonet	X. Semper; E. Semper; Luian; Ramos	DJ Luian; Mambo Kingz; Hydro	3:00
5.	"Vámonos" (with Sech)	Gomez; Justin Quiles; Carlos Morales	Joshua Javier Mendez; Jorge Valdes Vasquez	Dímelo Flow	3:31
6.	"Mejor Así" (with Darell)	Gomez; Rose; Darell	X. Semper; E. Semper; Luian; Édgar Barrera	DJ Luian; Mambo Kingz; Hydro	2:53
7.	"Peleas"	Gomez; Yasmil Marrufo; Mario Cáceres	Gomez; X. Semper; E. Semper; Luian; Campany; Kyle Shearer; Ramos	DJ Luian; Mambo Kingz; Hydro	3:27
8.	"No Te Pertenezco"	Gomez; Fuentes	X. Semper; E. Semper; Luian; Ramos	DJ Luian; Mambo Kingz; Hydro	3:37
9.	"En Mi Contra"	Gomez; Wander M. Méndez Santos	X. Semper; E. Semper; Luian; Ramos	DJ Luian; Mambo Kingz; Hydro	2:23
10.	"Me Acostumbré" (with Mau y Ricky)	Gomez; Ricky Montaner; Mau Montaner	X. Semper; E. Semper; Luian; Jon Leone; Barrera	Jon Leone; DJ Luian; Mambo Kingz; Hydro	3:36
11.	"Ni De Ti Ni De Nadie"	Gomez	X. Semper; E. Semper; Luian; Ramos	DJ Luian; Mambo Kingz; Hydro	3:01
12.	"Subiendo" (with Dalex)	Gomez; Pedro Daleccio	X. Semper; E. Semper; Luian; Ramos	DJ Luian; Mambo Kingz	2:58
13.	"Te Superé" (with Zion & Lennox and Farruko)	Gomez; Carlos Reyes; Félix Ortiz; Gabriel Pizarro	X. Semper; E. Semper; Luian; Fuentes; Maisonet; Ramos	DJ Luian; Mambo Kingz; Hydro	4:32
14.	"Cuando Te Besé" (with Paulo Londra)	Gomez; Paulo Londra	Daniel Echavarría Oviedo; Cristian Andrés Salazar	Ovy on the Drums; Jorge Fonseca	4:16
15.	"Sin Pijama" (with Natti Natasha)	Gomez; Natalia Gutiérrez; R. Montaner; M. Montaner	Campany; Shearer; Ramón Ayala; Gabriel Rivera; Leone; Camilo Echeverry	Daddy Yankee; Gaby Music; Mau y Ricky; Jon Leone; Camilo Echeverry	3:10
16.	"Mayores" (with Bad Bunny)	Benito Martinez; Servando Moriche Primera Mussett	Cáceres; Ingunza; Saul Alexander Castillo Vasquez; Jorge Fonseca	Jorge Fonseca	3:23
Total length:					55:52

=== Notes ===
- "Ni De Ti Ni De Nadie" samples "Turn Me On" by Kevin Lyttle.

== Charts ==
=== Weekly charts ===
Chart (2019–2020)	Peak position
Italian Albums (FIMI)	92
Spanish Albums (PROMUSICAE)	20
Spanish Streaming Albums (PROMUSICAE)	8
US Billboard 200	85
US Latin Rhythm Albums (Billboard)	3
US Top Latin Albums (Billboard)	3

=== Year-end charts ===
Chart (2019)	Position
US Top Latin Albums (Billboard)	69
Chart (2020)	Position
Spanish Albums (PROMUSICAE)	87
US Top Latin Albums (Billboard)	18
Chart (2021)	Position
US Top Latin Albums (Billboard)	58
Chart (2022)	Position
US Top Latin Albums (Billboard)	67

== Certifications ==
Region	Certification	Certified units/sales
Brazil (Pro-Música Brasil)	Platinum	40,000^{‡}
Italy (FIMI)	Gold	25,000^{‡}
Mexico (AMPROFON)	Platinum+Gold	90,000^{‡}
Poland (ZPAV)	Gold	10,000^{‡}
United States (RIAA)	7× Platinum (Latin)	420,000^{‡}
^{‡} Sales+streaming figures based on certification alone.

== Release history ==
Region	Date	Format	Label	Ref.
Various	October 17, 2019	digital download; streaming; LP	Kemosabe	
