= Mala Santa (song) =

Single by Becky G

from the album Mala Santa
- Language: Spanish
- English title: "Bad Saint"
- Released: October 11, 2019
- Length: 2:57
- Label: Kemosabe
- Songwriters: Rebbeca Marie Gomez; Luian Malavé Nieves; Edgar Semper; Xavier Semper; Kedin Maisonet; Pablo C. Fuentes
- Producers: DJ Luian; Mambo Kingz

Becky G singles chronology
"Chicken Noodle Soup" (2019)	"Mala Santa" (2019)	"Giants" (2019)

Music video
- "Mala Santa" on YouTube

"Mala Santa" is a song recorded by American singer Becky G. Written by Gomez, Luian Malavé Nieves, Edgar Semper, Xavier Semper, Kedin Maisonet and Pablo C. Fuentes, it was released by Kemosabe Records on October 11, 2019, as the fifth and final single from Gomez's debut studio album of the same name.

== Music video ==
Due to the LP being a visual album, the song does not have an official video despite being the fifth single. Instead, it was released under the title "MALA SANTA (Álbum Visual)". The clip sees Gomez wearing two different body suits, one in white and the other in black, with a blue lighting background for the former and a red one for the latter. She performs the same choreography in one cut on both; these scenes are spliced in between each other.

== Live performance ==
Gomez performed the song live for the first time at the Latin American Music Awards of 2019 in a medley with her hit songs "Sin Pijama" and "Mayores". She performed the medley again with a different arrangement at the LOS40 Music Awards 2019 about three weeks later.

== Accolades ==
Awards and nominations for "Mala Santa"
Organization	Year	Category	Result	Ref.
Premios Tu Música Urbano	2020	Female Song	Nominated	

== Credits and personnel ==
- Rebbeca Marie Gomez – vocals, songwriter
- Luian Malavé Nieves – songwriter, producer
- Edgar Semper – songwriter, producer
- Xavier Semper – songwriter, producer
- Kedin Maisonet – songwriter
- Pablo C. Fuentes – songwriter

== Charts ==
=== Weekly charts ===
Chart (2019–2020)	Peak position
Argentina (Argentina Hot 100)	90
Ecuador (National-Report)	6
Italy (FIMI)	63
Romania (Airplay 100)	12
Spain (PROMUSICAE)	68
US Hot Latin Songs (Billboard)	21

=== Year-end charts ===
Chart (2020)	Position
Romania (Airplay 100)	11

== Certifications ==
Region	Certification	Certified units/sales
Brazil (Pro-Música Brasil)	Platinum	40,000^{‡}
Italy (FIMI)	Gold	35,000^{‡}
Mexico (AMPROFON)	2× Platinum+Gold	150,000^{‡}
Spain (Promusicae)	Platinum	60,000^{‡}
United States (RIAA)	Platinum (Latin)	60,000^{‡}
^{‡} Sales+streaming figures based on certification alone.

== Release history ==
Release dates and formats for "Mala Santa"
Region	Date	Format	Label	Ref.
Various	October 11, 2019	Digital download; streaming	Kemosabe	
Italy	March 13, 2020	Contemporary hit radio	Sony Latin	
Italy	March 13, 2020	Radio airplay	Sony Latin	
