= Alex Luna (Mexican singer) =

Mexican singer-singer (born 2001)

Alejandro Luna Casas (born Cancún, Mexico 2001), better known as Alex Luna, is a Mexican singer-songwriter and producer who specializes in pop and dance music. At the 2025 Latin Grammy Awards Luna was nominated for the Best New Artist award.

== Songwriting ==
Alex Luna has written song lyrics for artists including Becky G, Grupo Fontera, and Christian Nodal.

== Discography ==
=== Singles ===
Year	Title	Recognition
2022	"Te marqué pedo"	Billboard Viral 50 Global chart

=== Album ===
Alex Luna released his 11 track album FUTURALGIA, in February 2025. The album is accompanied by a short film that film depicts the five stages of grief.
