= Shower (song) =

2014 single by Becky G

Single by Becky G
- Released: April 23, 2014
- Recorded: 2013
- Genre: Teen pop; pop rap
- Length: 3:26
- Label: Kemosabe; RCA
- Songwriters: Lukasz Gottwald; Henry Walter; Rebbeca Marie Gomez
- Producers: Dr. Luke; Cirkut

Becky G singles chronology
"Can't Get Enough" (2014)	"Shower" (2014)	"Can't Stop Dancin'" (2014)

Music video
- "Shower" on YouTube

"Shower" is a song by American singer Becky G. It was released on April 23, 2014, by Kemosabe and RCA Records. The song was written by Gomez, Dr. Luke and Cirkut. Its music video was released on June 30, 2014. "Shower" reached the top 20 in the United States and the top 10 in the Czech Republic, the Netherlands, and Norway. The song was certified double platinum by the Recording Industry Association of America (RIAA) for selling over 2 million copies in the US. The official remix features American rapper Tyga.

In late January 2026, the song reached one billion streams on Spotify, becoming Gomez's first solo song and second overall to reach the milestone.

== Background and release ==
"Shower" was released for retail via digital distribution on April 23, 2014. The audio for the song was also uploaded to YouTube and VEVO on the same day of its release.

== Composition ==
It is composed in the D Major scale at 120BPM. It follows the chord progression of G-D-Bm-A. Musically, "Shower" is a teen pop and melodic rap song. The track was written by Dr. Luke, Cirkut, and Rock City before being presented to Gomez, who contributed to the bridge. Lyrically, it is a "breezy ode to first love". Gomez has said, "Everyone can relate to the song, even if you don't understand the words."

== Music video ==
The video was released on June 30, 2014, via VEVO, being uploaded on YouTube the following day. It features cameo appearances by American rappers T. Mills and Doja Cat. Gomez explained the concept: "We wanted to capture moments of feeling good, and me personally when I feel good is when I'm hanging out with friends or that special person. It's a party basically..." MTV described the visuals as "carefree". As of September 2024, the music video for "Shower" has over 508 million views on YouTube.

== Reception ==
BuzzFeed called the song "2014's 'Call Me Maybe'" and said that it is "kind of awful and you'll love it". Maximum Pop! compared the single to the work of Gomez's previous duet partner Cher Lloyd and described it as "a bubbly future pop hit." Time said the song "is such a seasonally appropriate sugar rush that it's borderline preposterous the song hasn't been a more serious contender for Song of the Summer."

== Commercial performance ==
"Shower" debuted at number 88 on the US Billboard Hot 100 chart before peaking at number 16 on the charts, making it her first solo entry and second overall after her collaboration with Lloyd in 2012. The song debuted at number 39 on the Rhythmic Songs chart and 36 on the Billboard Pop Songs on the week dated for June 21, 2014. It also debuted at number 48 on Hot Digital Songs on the week ending June 28, 2014. It peaked at number 1 on the US Heatseekers chart. By the end of November 2020, the song became a viral hit on the social media platform TikTok, generating around 6.3 million videos.

== Accolades ==
Year	Awards	Category	Result	Ref.
2015	Premios Juventud	Favorite Hit	Won	
2015	Radio Disney Music Awards	Catchiest New Song	Won	

== Charts ==
=== Weekly charts ===
Chart (2014)	Peak position
Australia (ARIA)	11
Austria (Ö3 Austria Top 40)	59
Belgium (Ultratip Bubbling Under Flanders)	14
Belgium (Ultratip Bubbling Under Wallonia)	33
Canada Hot 100 (Billboard)	38
Canada CHR/Top 40 (Billboard)	35
Canada Hot AC (Billboard)	49
Czech Republic Airplay (ČNS IFPI)	3
Czech Republic Singles Digital (ČNS IFPI)	7
Finland (Suomen virallinen lista)	28
France (SNEP)	155
Germany (GfK)	42
Hungary (Stream Top 40)	27
Ireland (IRMA)	45
Israel (Media Forest TV Airplay)	8
Italy (FIMI)	56
Netherlands (Dutch Top 40)	5
Netherlands (Single Top 100)	9
Netherlands (Mega Top 50)	4
New Zealand (Recorded Music NZ)	27
Norway (VG-lista)	6
Portugal (AFP)	40
Slovakia Airplay (ČNS IFPI)	39
Slovakia Singles Digital (ČNS IFPI)	11
Spain (Promusicae)	37
Sweden (Sverigetopplistan)	11
UK Singles (Official Charts)	80
US Billboard Hot 100	16
US Hot Rap Songs (Billboard)	2
US Latin Pop Airplay (Billboard)	36
US Pop Airplay (Billboard)	17
US Rhythmic Airplay (Billboard)	29

=== Year-end charts ===
Chart (2014)	Position
Australia (ARIA)	63
Netherlands (Dutch Top 40)	25
Netherlands (Single Top 100)	32
Sweden (Sverigetopplistan)	51
US Billboard Hot 100	69
US Hot Rap Songs (Billboard)	8

== Certifications ==
Region	Certification	Certified units/sales
Australia (ARIA)	2× Platinum	140,000^{^}
Canada (Music Canada)	Platinum	80,000^{*}
Germany (BVMI)	Platinum	300,000^{‡}
Italy (FIMI)	Gold	25,000^{‡}
Mexico (AMPROFON)	2× Platinum+Gold	150,000^{‡}
Netherlands (NVPI)	Platinum	20,000^{^}
New Zealand (RMNZ)	3× Platinum	90,000^{‡}
Norway (IFPI Norway)	3× Platinum	180,000^{‡}
Portugal (AFP)	Gold	10,000^{‡}
Spain (Promusicae)	Platinum	60,000^{‡}
Sweden (GLF)	2× Platinum	80,000^{‡}
United Kingdom (BPI)	Platinum	600,000^{‡}
United States (RIAA)	2× Platinum	2,000,000^{‡}
Streaming
Denmark (IFPI Danmark)	Platinum	2,600,000^{†}
^{*} Sales figures based on certification alone.^{^} Shipments figures based on certification alone.^{‡} Sales+streaming figures based on certification alone.^{†} Streaming-only figures based on certification alone.

== Release history ==
Release dates and formats for "Shower"
Region	Date	Format	Label(s)	Ref.
United States	May 20, 2014	Mainstream airplay	RCA	
