= Camilo discography =

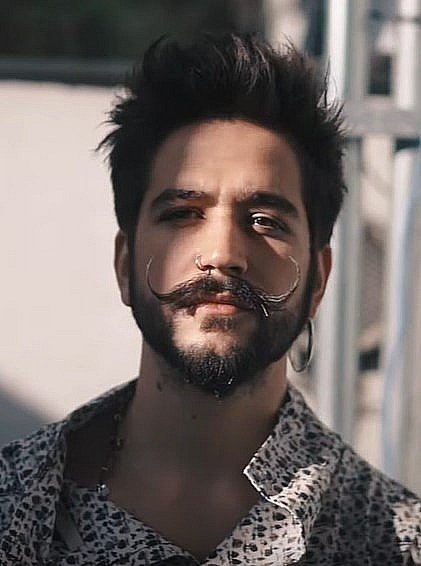
- Camilo in 2019
- Studio albums: 4
- EPs: 3
- Singles: 19
- Promotional singles: 1
- Mixtapes: 2

Colombian singer Camilo has released three studio albums, two mixtapes, and 19 singles, including nine as a featured artist and duets.

== Albums ==
=== Studio albums ===
Title	Studio album details	Peaks				Certifications
Title	Studio album details	SPA	US	US Latin	US Latin Pop	Certifications
Por Primera Vez	Released: April 17, 2020; Label: Sony Latin, HAMM; Formats: CD, digital download, streaming	5	—	5	1	AMPROFON: Diamond+Gold; PROMUSICAE: Gold; RIAA: 5× Platinum (Latin)
Mis Manos	Released: March 4, 2021; Label: Sony Latin, HAMM; Formats: CD, digital download, streaming	2	173	5	2	AMPROFON: Platinum+Gold; PROMUSICAE: 2× Platinum; RIAA: 5× Platinum (Latin)
De Adentro Pa Afuera	Released: September 6, 2022; Label: Sony Latin, HAMM; Formats: CD, digital download, streaming	4	—	28	6	AMPROFON: Gold; PROMUSICAE: Gold; RIAA: 2× Platinum (Latin)
cuatro	Released: May 13, 2024; Label: Sony Latin, HAMM; Formats: CD, digital download, streaming	15	—	—	—	RIAA: Gold (Latin)
"—" denotes a recording that did not chart or was not released in that territory.

=== Mixtapes ===
Title	Studio album details
Regálame tu corazón	Released: January 18, 2008; Label: RCN
Tráfico de Sentimientos	Released: October 25, 2010; Label: Sony Colombia

=== Extended plays ===
Title	Studio album details	Peaks				Certifications
Title	Studio album details	SPA	US	US Latin	US Latin Pop	Certifications
un	Released: February 7, 2024; Label: Sony Latin, HAMM; Formats: CD, digital download, streaming	—	—	—	—	
dos	Released: April 3, 2024; Label: Sony Latin, HAMM; Formats: CD, digital download, streaming	—	—	—	—	
tres	Released: May 8, 2024; Label: Sony Latin, HAMM; Formats: CD, digital download, streaming	—	—	—	—	

== Singles ==
=== As lead artist ===
List of singles as lead artist, with selected chart positions and certifications, showing year released and album name
Title	Year	Peak chart positions							Certifications	Album
Title	Year	COL	ARG	ITA	MEX	SPA	US Latin	US Latin Pop	Certifications	Album
"No Te Vayas"	2019	—	—	—	— (Note: "No Te Vayas" did not enter the Billboard Mexico Airplay chart, but peaked at number 46 on the Mexico Espanol Airplay chart.)	—	—	30	AMPROFON: 2× Platinum+Gold; RIAA: Platinum (Latin)	Por Primera Vez
"Tutu" (with Pedro Capó or remix with Shakira)	2019	4	1	97	1	8	16	2	AMPROFON: Diamond+4× Platinum; PRO-MÚSICA: 2× Platinum (Internacional); PROMUSICAE: Platinum; RIAA: 10× Platinum (Latin)	Por Primera Vez
"La Difícil"	2019	—	69	—	—	—	—	—	AMPROFON: Platinum+Gold	Por Primera Vez
"Por Primera Vez" (with Evaluna Montaner)	2020	61	12	—	—	—	—	—	AMPROFON: 3× Platinum	Por Primera Vez
"Favorito"	2020	8	2	—	8	4	25	6	AMPROFON: Diamond; PROMUSICAE: 3× Platinum; RIAA: 3× Platinum (Latin)	Por Primera Vez
"El Mismo Aire" (solo or with Pablo Alborán)	2020	21	38	—	—	28	—	—	AMPROFON: Diamond; PROMUSICAE: 2× Platinum	Por Primera Vez
"Vida de Rico"	2020	1	1	—	3	7	8	1	AMPROFON: Diamond+Platinum; PRO-MÚSICA: Gold (Internacional); PROMUSICAE: 5× Platinum; RIAA: 8× Platinum (Latin)	Mis Manos
"Bebé" (with El Alfa or remix with Gusttavo Lima)	2020	—	4	—	34	10	22	20	AMPROFON: Gold; PRO-MÚSICA: Gold+Platinum (Internacional); PROMUSICAE: 2× Platinum; RIAA: 5× Platinum (Latin)	Mis Manos
"Ropa Cara"	2021	22	4	—	6	23	21	—	AMPROFON: Platinum+Gold; PROMUSICAE: Gold; RIAA: 3× Platinum (Latin)	Mis Manos
"Machu Picchu" (with Evaluna Montaner)	2021	—	21	—	— (Note: "Machu Picchu" did not enter the Billboard Mexico Airplay chart, but peaked at number 22 on the Mexico Pop Español Airplay chart.)	13	31	—	PROMUSICAE: Platinum; RIAA: 2× Platinum (Latin)	Mis Manos
"Millones"	2021	9	21	—	5	41	26	1	AMPROFON: Gold; PROMUSICAE: Platinum; RIAA: Platinum (Latin)	Mis Manos
"Kesi"	2021	6	41	—	6	22	22	3	AMPROFON: Gold; PROMUSICAE: Platinum; RIAA: Platinum (Latin)	Mis Manos
"Kesi (Remix)" (with Shawn Mendes)	2021	—	41	—	6	46	22	3	PROMUSICAE: Platinum; RIAA: Platinum (Latin)	Non-album single
"Índigo" (with Evaluna Montaner)	2021	2	5	—	4	6	21	4	AMPROFON: Platinum; PROMUSICAE: Platinum; RIAA: 2× Platinum (Latin)	De Adentro Pa' Fuera
"Pesadilla"	2021	100	—	—	24	85	—	22	RIAA: Gold (Latin)	De Adentro Pa' Fuera
"Pegao"	2022	11	35	—	9	22	—	8	PROMUSICAE: Platinum	De Adentro Pa' Fuera
"NASA" (with Alejandro Sanz)	2022	—	—	—	—	57	—	—		De Adentro Pa' Fuera
"Naturaleza" (with Nicki Nicole)	2022	—	64	—	—	—	—	—		De Adentro Pa' Fuera
"Salitre" (with Manuel Carrasco)	2023	—	—	—	—	29	—	—		Non-album single
"Gordo"	2024	—	—	—	—	—	—	—		un
"No Se Vale"	2024	—	—	—	—	—	—	—		un
"Plis" (with Evaluna Montaner)	2024	—	68	—	—	—	—	—		un
"Autodiagnóstico"	2024	—	—	—	—	—	—	—		dos
"En Tus Sueños o En Los Míos"	2024	—	—	—	—	—	—	—		dos
"Una Vida Pasada" (with Carín León)	2024	—	55	—	—	61	—	—		dos
"Amor de Extranjeros"	2024	—	—	—	—	—	—	—		tres
"Corazón de Hojalata"	2024	—	—	—	—	—	—	—		tres
"Misión Imposible"	2024	—	—	—	—	—	—	—		tres
"La Boda"	2024	—	—	—	—	—	—	—		cuatro
"Sálvame" (with Alexander Abreu and Havana D'Primera)	2024	—	—	—	—	—	—	—		cuatro
"Una Canción de Amor para La Pulga"	2024	—	—	—	—	—	—	—		cuatro
"—" denotes a recording that did not chart or was not released in that territory.

=== As a featured artist ===
List of singles as featured artist showing year released and chart positions
Title	Year	Peak chart positions								Certifications	Album
Title	Year	COL	ARG	BEL	ECU	MEX	SPA	US Latin	US Latin Pop	Certifications	Album
"Desconocidos" (Mau y Ricky with Manuel Turizo and Camilo)	2018	2	10	—	15	31	25	31	21	ASINCOL: Platinum; AMPROFON: Diamond+3× Platinum+Gold; IFPI PER: 2× Platinum; PROMUSICAE: Platinum; RIAA: 11× Platinum (Latin)	Para Aventuras y Curiosidades
"La Boca" (Mau y Ricky with Camilo)	2019	5	6	—	6	32	51	—	—	AMPROFON: 4× Platinum+Gold; PRO-MÚSICA: Gold (Internacional); CAPIF: Gold; RIAA: 6× Platinum (Latin)	Para Aventuras y Curiosidades
"Primer Avión" (Matisse with Camilo)	2019	—	—	—	—	44	—	—	—	AMPROFON: 2× Platinum+Gold	Non-album singles
"Boomshakalaka" (Dimitri Vegas & Like Mike, Afro Bros and Sebastián Yatra featuring Camilo and Emilia)	2019	—	—	— (Note: "Boomshakalaka" did not enter the Ultratop Flemish Top 50, but peaked at number 1 on the Ultratip Flemish chart.)	32	—	—	—	—		Non-album singles
"Si Me Dices Que Sí" (Reik with Camilo and Farruko)	2020	—	48	—	—	6	90	14	1	AMPROFON: 4× Platinum; PROMUSICAE: Gold; RIAA: Platinum (Latin)	Non-album singles
"Tattoo (Remix)" (Rauw Alejandro with Camilo)	2020	7	1	—	2	— (Note: "Tattoo (Remix)" did not enter the Billboard Mexico Airplay chart, but peaked at number 12 on the Mexico Espanol Airplay chart.)	2	7	16	AMPROFON: 2× Platinum; PRO-MÚSICA: Gold (Internacional); PROMUSICAE: 4× Platinum	Afrodisiaco
"Titanic" (Kany García with Camilo)	2020	47	—	—	—	—	—	—	20	AMPROFON: Platinum	Mesa Para Dos
"Despeinada" (Ozuna with Camilo)	2020	1	11	—	12	—	2	11	1	AMPROFON: Platinum; PROMUSICAE: 2× Platinum	ENOC
"Amén" (Ricardo Montaner with Mau y Ricky, Camilo and Evaluna Montaner)	2020	—	46	—	—	48	—	—	15		Non-album singles
"999" (Selena Gomez with Camilo)	2021	—	88	—	—	— (Note: "999" did not enter the Billboard Mexico Airplay chart, but peaked at number 29 on the Mexico Espanol Airplay chart.)	—	25	7		Non-album singles
"Buenos Días" (Wisin and Los Legendarios with Camilo)	2022	21	42	—	—	21	32	—	10	AMPROFON: Gold	Non-album singles
"Baloncito Viejo" (Carlos Vives with Camilo)	2022	—	—	—	—	—	—	41	1	RIAA: Gold (Latin)	Non-album singles
"Moderación" (with JP Saxe)	2023	—	—	—	—	—	—	—	—		A Grey Area
"—" denotes a recording that did not chart or was not released in that territory.

=== Promotional singles ===
List of promotional singles
Title	Year	Album
"5 pa las 12"	2020	Mis Manos

== Other charted songs and certifications ==
List of other charted songs and certifications, with selected chart positions
Title	Year	Peaks					Certifications	Album
Title	Year	ARG	MEX	SPA	SUR	US Latin	Certifications	Album
"Tutu (Remix)" (with Pedro Capó and Shakira)	2019	—	—	98	—	—		Por Primera Vez
"La Mitad" (with Christian Nodal)	2020	—	18	—	—	—	AMPROFON: 3× Platinum+Gold	Por Primera Vez
"Tuyo y Mío" (with Los Dos Carnales)	2021	—	—	—	39	—		Mis Manos
"Contigo Voy a Muerte" (Karol G featuring Camilo)	2021	—	—	100	—	—	AMPROFON: Gold	KG0516
"Aeropuerto"	2022	—	—	91	—	—		De Adentro Pa' Fuera
"Ambulancia" (with Camila Cabello)	2022	84	—	—	24	—		De Adentro Pa' Fuera
"—" denotes a recording that did not chart or was not released in that territory.

== Other appearances ==
Title	Year	Other artist(s)	Album
"En Guerra"	2019	Sebastián Yatra	Fantasía
"Contigo Voy a Muerte"	2021	Karol G	KG0516
"Memories"	2025	Gen Hoshino, Umi	Gen

== Songwriting credits ==
List of songs written or co-written for other artists
Title	Year	Artist(s)	Album
"Internacionales"	2017	Bomba Estéreo	Ayo
"Paleta"	2017	Ha*Ash	30 de Febrero
"Mi Mala"	2017	Mau y Ricky, Karol G	Para Aventuras y Curiosidades
"Mi Mala (Remix)"	2018	Mau y Ricky, Karol G, Becky G, Leslie Grace, Lali	Para Aventuras y Curiosidades
"Japonesa"	2018	Mau y Ricky	Para Aventuras y Curiosidades
"22"	2018	Mau y Ricky	Para Aventuras y Curiosidades
"Ya No Tiene Novio"	2018	Sebastián Yatra, Mau y Ricky	Para Aventuras y Curiosidades
"Sin Querer Queriendo"	2018	Lali, Mau y Ricky	Brava and Para Aventuras y Curiosidades
"Duro y Suave"	2018	Leslie Grace, Noriel	None
"Cuidao"	2018	Play-N-Skillz, Yandel, Messiah	None
"El Clavo"	2018	Prince Royce	Alter Ego
"El Clavo (Remix)"	2018	Prince Royce, Maluma	Alter Ego
"Sin Pijama"	2018	Becky G, Natti Natasha	Mala Santa
"Qué Tienes Tú"	2018	Dvicio, Mau y Ricky, Reik	Qué Tienes Tú
"Pa Dentro"	2018	Juanes	Más Futuro Que Pasado
"Me liberé"	2018	Evaluna Montaner	None
"Sigamos Bailando"	2018	Gianluca Vacchi, Luis Fonsi, Yandel	None
"Veneno"	2018	Anitta	Solo
"¿Qué Vas a Hacer?"	2018	Ricardo Montaner	Montaner
"Si Estuviésemos Juntos"	2018	Bad Bunny	X 100pre
"Recalienta"	2019	Emilia	None
"Hijoepu*#"	2019	Gloria Trevi, Karol G	Diosa de La Noche
"Mal Acompañados"	2019	Mau y Ricky	Para Aventuras y Curiosidades
"No Me Hagas Daño"	2019	Ricardo Montaner	Montaner
"Ausencia"	2019	Ricardo Montaner	Montaner
"Madrugada"	2019	Ricardo Montaner	Montaner
"Lo Más Lindo de Mi Vida"	2019	Ricardo Montaner	Montaner
"Quiero"	2019	Ricardo Montaner	Montaner
"Una Canción para el Despecho"	2019	Ricardo Montaner, Mau y Ricky, Tainy	Montaner
"Querer Mejor"	2019	Juanes, Alessia Cara	Más Futuro Que Pasado
"Fuego"	2019	DJ Snake, Sean Paul, Anitta	Carte Blanche
"Cómo No"	2019	Akon, Becky G	El Negreeto
"Ya Tú Me Conoces"	2020	Thalía, Mau y Ricky	None
"If the World Was Ending (Spanglish Version)"	2020	JP Saxe, Evaluna Montaner	None
"Los Huesos"	2020	Dani Martín, Juanes	Lo Que Me Dé La Gana
"La Jaula"	2020	Dani Martín	Lo Que Me Dé La Gana
"Lo Que Me Dé La Gana"	2020	Dani Martín	Lo Que Me Dé La Gana
"Lo Que Tengo Yo"	2020	Lali	Libra
"No Puedo Olvidarte"	2020	Lali, Mau y Ricky	Libra
"Alguien Como Tú"	2020	Twin Melody	None
"Convénceme"	2020	India Martínez, Marc Anthony	None
"Intro"	2020	Mau y Ricky	Rifresh
"Borrachos"	2020	Mau y Ricky	Rifresh
"Un Poco"	2020	Reik, Christian Nodal	Lo Más Romántico De
"Uno Más Uno"	2021	Evaluna Montaner	None
