= 6th Platino Awards =

2019 film awards ceremony

- Date: May 12, 2019
- Site: Teatro Gran Tlachco in Riviera Maya, Mexico
- Hosted by: Cecilia Suárez and Santiago Segura

Highlights
- Most awards: Roma (5)
- Most nominations: Roma (9)

Television coverage
- Network: TNT Latin America

The 6th Platino Awards was presented at Gran Tlachco Theater in Riviera Maya, Mexico on May 12, 2019, to honour the best in Ibero-American films of 2018. The ceremony was televised in Latin America by TNT, and hosted by Cecilia Suárez and Santiago Segura.

Roma received the most nominations with nine, and the most awards with five.

== Performers ==
Artist(s)	Song(s)
Lali	"100 Grados" "Sin Querer Queriendo" "Caliente"
Sofía Reyes	"1, 2, 3" "R.I.P."

== Winners and nominees ==
Best Ibero-American Film: Roma; Champions; A Twelve-Year Night; Birds of Passage	Best Director: Alfonso Cuarón – Roma; Javier Fesser – Champions; Álvaro Brechner – A Twelve-Year Night; Ciro Guerra and Cristina Gallego – Birds of Passage
Best Actor: Antonio de la Torre – The Realm; Javier Bardem – Everybody Knows; Javier Gutiérrez – Champions; Lorenzo Ferro – El Angel	Best Actress: Ana Brun – The Heiresses; Marina de Tavira – Roma; Penélope Cruz – Everybody Knows; Yalitza Aparicio – Roma
Best Screenplay: Alfonso Cuarón – Roma; Álvaro Brechner – A Twelve-Year Night; David Marqués, Javier Fesser – Champions; Marcelo Martinessi – The Heiresses	Best Original Score: Alberto Iglesias – Yuli; Edu Lobo – The Great Mystical Circus; Federico Jusid – A Twelve-Year Night; Olivier Arson – The Realm
Best Animated Film: Another Day of Life; The Wolf House; Memoirs of a Man in Pajamas; Virus Tropical	Best Documentary: The Silence of Others; Camarón: Flamenco y revolución; Devil's Freedom; Ruben Blades Is Not My Name
Best Cinematography: Alfonso Cuarón – Roma; Carlos Catalán – A Twelve-Year Night; Luis Armando Arteaga –- The Heiresses; David Gallego – Birds of Passage	Best Art Direction: Angélica Perea – Birds of Passage; Benjamín Fernández – The Man Who Killed Don Quixote; Artur Pinheiro – The Great Mystical Circus; Eugenio Caballero – Roma
Best Editing: The Realm — Alberto del Campo; El Angel — Guillermo Gatti; Birds of Passage — Miguel Schverdfinger; Roma — Alfonso Cuarón, Adam Gough	Best Sound: Roma — Sergio Díaz, José Antonio García, Craig Henighan, Skip Lievsay; El Angel — José Luis Díaz; The Realm — Roberto Fernández, Alfonso Raposo; Birds of Passage — Carlos E. García
Best Debut Film: Marcelo Martinessi – The Heiresses; Arantxa Echevarría – Carmen & Lola; Gustavo Rondón Córdova – The Family; Celia Rico Clavellino – Journey to a Mother's Room	Cinema and Education in Values: Champions; Carmen & Lola; A Twelve-Year Night; The Heiresses
Best Actor in a Miniseries or TV series: Diego Luna — Narcos: México as Miguel Ángel Félix Gallardo; Diego Boneta — Luis Miguel as Luis Miguel; Nicolás Furtado — El Marginal as Juan Pablo Borges; Javier Rey — Fariña as Sito Miñanco	Best Actress in a Miniseries or TV series: Cecilia Suárez — The House of Flowers as Paulina de la Mora; Anna Castillo — Arde Madrid as Pilar; Inma Cuesta — Arde Madrid as Ana Mari; Najwa Nimri — Vis a vis as Zulema Zahir
Best Ibero-American Miniseries or TV series: Arde Madrid; El Marginal; The House of Flowers; Narcos: Mexico

=== Honorary Platino ===
- Raphael
