= 100 Grados =

Single by Lali featuring A. Chal

from the album Brava
- Language: Spanish
- English title: "100 Degrees"
- Released: April 13, 2018
- Genre: Latin pop; urban pop
- Length: 3:25
- Label: Sony Argentina
- Songwriter(s): Alejandro Salazar; Andres David Restrepo; Gustavo Novello; Luis Burgio; Mariana Espósito; Pablo Akselrad; Salomón Villada Hoyos; Stiven Rojas; Kevin Mauricio Jiménez; Bryan Snaider Lezcano; Alejandro Patiño; Jowan Espinosa; Juan Pablo Piedrahita; Daniel Giraldo
- Producer(s): 3musica; Icon Music; Rude Boyz

Lali singles chronology
| "Mi Mala (Remix)" (2018) | "100 Grados" (2018) | "Prohibido (Remix)" (2018) |

A. Chal singles chronology
| "Cuánto" (2018) | "100 Grados" (2018) | "000000" (2019) |

Music video
- "100 Grados" on YouTube

"100 Grados" (English: "one-hundred degrees") is a song by Argentine singer Lali featuring vocals from Peruvian/American singer and producer A. Chal, from her third studio album, Brava (2018). Written by Lali, A. Chal, Feid, Stiven Rojas, Rolo, Mosty, Nano Novello, Luis Burgio, Peter Akselrad, Kevin Mauricio Jiménez, Bryan Snaider Lezcano, Jowan Espinosa, Juan Pablo Piedrahita and Daniel Giraldo, and produced by 3musica and Icon Music, it was released by Sony Music Argentina as the album's third single on April 13, 2018. The song became the Espósito's third No. 1 hit on the Argentina Lista 40 followed by "Besarte Mucho" which was her fourth number 1 in the chart.

== Background and composition ==
"100 Grados" is a Latin, urban pop song with EDM beats. It was first proposed by Icon Music, who recorded a demo for the song. They travelled to Buenos Aires to work with 3musica, who changed the chorus and re-made it at the compositional level. Together, they modified some aspects on the creative process to achieve its final sound. It was written by Feid, Rolo, Mosty, and Jowan from Icon Music, Nano Novello, Luis Burgio, Peter Akselrad from 3musica, Kevin Mauricio Jiménez, Bryan Snaider Lezcano, Juan Pablo Piedrahita, Daniel Giraldo, Lali, A. Chal and Stiven Rojas.

The song title is mentioned only once throughout the whole song. According to Lali, it "summarizes the topic [and] represents what happens to a couple when they get to see each other after a long time."

== Critical reception ==
Diario26.com staff wrote that "Lali puts herself in the focus of a mature and infectious composition, different from the traditional formulas and imposing her personal impront." In Diario Show, it was written that in the "relentless future hit, Lali and A. Chal achieve a perfect connection in which the beats are the perfect excuse for a spicy dialogue." American blogger Perez Hilton described the song as "a sweet midtempo love song."

=== Accolades ===
The song won in the category of Favorite Song at the Kids' Choice Awards Argentina of 2018.

== Music video ==
Directed by Ariel Winograd and Diego Berakha, the accompanying "cinematographic" music video for the single made its premiere on Vevo at midnight ART on April 13, 2018. Lali and Winograd had previously worked together on the film That's Not Cheating, in which Lali starred and which Winograd directed. The clip was shot with "great technichal accuracy" and shows multiples versions of Lali and A. Chal, who appear and vanish at the rhythm of the beats, "creating a fresh, unique experience." By generating an "oneiric and full of cadences atmosphere", the directors succeed at representing the essence of the song.

== Live performances ==
The first televised live performance of the song took place on June 3 at the 2018 Martin Fierro Awards. Espósito performed the song as well as her previous singles "Tu Novia" and "Una Na". It was the first ever musical performance in the history of the awards, which award the best in television and radio. Wearing a black leathered bodysuit and boots, Espósito performed the songs at the Alvear Icon Hotel's terrace in Puerto Madero, Buenos Aires. At the end of the performance, Espósito lifted up a green handkerchief, sign of the pro-abortion movement in Argentina.

On July, Espósito performed the song on the American TV shows ¡Despierta América! and Viva el Mundial y Más alongside A. Chal. On September 5, 2018, Lali performed the song with Anitta at Talento FOX, where they also performed Anitta's song "Downtown".

On May 12, 2019, Lali performed "100 Grados" as well as "Sin Querer Queriendo" and "Caliente" at the 6th Platino Awards.

== Personnel ==
Credits adapted from Tidal.

- Lali Espósito – vocals, songwriting
- A. Chal – vocals, songwriting
- Kevin Mauricio Jiménez Londoño – songwriting
- Gustavo Novello – songwriting, keyboard, record engineering, producer
- Bryan Snaider Lezcano – songwriting
- Luis Burgio – songwriting, drums
- Stiven Rojas – songwriting
- Peter Akselrad – songwriting, guitar
- Feid – songwriting, producer
- Mosty – songwriting, producer
- Jowan Espinosa – songwriting, producer
- Andrés David Restrepo – songwriting, producer
- Juan Pablo Piedrahita – songwriting
- Daniel Giraldo – songwriting
- Earcandy – mix engineering
- Antonella Giunta – background vocals
- Facundo Yalve – record engineering, guitar

== Charts ==
=== Weekly charts ===
| Chart (2018) | Peak position |
|---|---|
| Argentina (Monitor Latino) | 19 |
| Argentina Latin Airplay (Monitor Latino) | 18 |
| Argentina National Songs (Monitor Latino) | 2 |
| Ecuador (National-Report) | 53 |
| Mexico Airplay (Billboard) | 38 |
| Mexico Espanol Airplay (Billboard) | 14 |
| Paraguay Pop (Monitor Latino) | 8 |
| Uruguay (Monitor Latino) | 8 |

=== Year-end charts ===
| Chart (2018) | Position |
|---|---|
| Argentina (Monitor Latino) | 82 |
| Argentina Latin (Monitor Latino) | 70 |
| Panama Pop (Monitor Latino) | 75 |
| Uruguay (Monitor Latino) | 33 |
