= Brava (Lali album) =

Studio album by Lali
- Released: 10 August 2018
- Recorded: 2017–2018
- Length: 42:07
- Label: Sony Argentina
- Producer: 3musica; Di Genius; Rude Boyz; Abraham Mateo; Ricky Montaner; Haze; Luis O'Neill; Icon Music

Lali chronology
Soy (2016)	Brava (2018)	Libra (2020)

Singles from Brava
- 1. "Una Na" Released: 28 July 2017; 2. "Tu Novia" Released: 17 November 2017; 3. "100 Grados" Released: 13 April 2018; 4. "Besarte Mucho" Released: 20 July 2018; 5. "Sin Querer Queriendo" Released: 24 August 2018; 6. "Caliente" Released: 14 November 2018; 7. "Somos Amantes" Released: 10 May 2019

Brava (English: Fierce) is the third studio album by Argentine singer Lali. It was released on 10 August 2018, through Sony Music Argentina. The album is the follow-up to her second studio album Soy (2016), and features guest appearances from Reik, Pabllo Vittar, A. Chal, Abraham Mateo and Mau y Ricky.

Brava won the awards for Best Female Pop Album and Best Cover Design at the 21st Annual Gardel Awards. The album's fifth single, "Sin Querer Queriendo", also won in the category for Song of the Year.

== Background ==
Buzz about her third studio album started in May 2017, when Lali confirmed that she had begun working on new song titled "Sin Enamorarnos". However, the song was never released. In July that same year, Espósito released "Una Na" as the album's lead single. While promoting the song, the singer told Billboard that, for her, "It is not enough to work on a concept for the album. Each song must be dealt with as a unique piece." She also told Clarín that there was not a confirmed release date for the album yet, though it was thought to be in early 2018. In November, she premiered two songs in a show at the Luna Park Arena. Both songs, "Tu Novia" and "Tu Sonrisa" were officially released between November and December.

In April 2018, Espósito released "100 Grados" as the album's third official single. While promoting the single, the singer confirmed to Radio Disney that her album would be called Brava and it would be released in August. According to her, it is called that way because it's short, clear, empowering and has attitude. She explained to Billboard that "even if no song on the album has that name, [that] is the message I want to send." She clarified the meaning behind the title by saying: "I think it's time for myself to get fierce, to impose myself and to find my own way, not only at the moment of making music, but also in any situation of my every-day life". She also told Perfil: "I want to end with the joke of Latin music that shows men as handsome and fucking lots of girls, while women are shown dancing and moving their asses next to men. I, as a woman, want to show that we can do what we want and that [men] don't rule." She added: "I got fierce to defend the image of the woman."

The last single before the album release, "Besarte Mucho", was released in July. Days after, she revealed the album's cover, which combines elements of the Baroque style and the Latin American and Italian cultures.

== Promotion ==
On 8 August 2018, pre-listening parties were held in the United States, Puerto Rico, Mexico, Spain, Brazil, Colombia, Argentina, Chile, and more, in which selected fans were given the opportunity to listen to the entire album and videocall Lali two days before of the release of the album. On 9 August, Espósito held a press conference in which multiple Argentine press members assisted to ask questions about the album. Throughout the month, the singer held album signing events in Buenos Aires, Córdoba, Santiago, Montevideo, Mexico City, Monterrey and Puebla, in which she met hundreds of fans.

Espósito embarked on the Brava Tour immediately after the album release, starting on 23 August 2018 at the Luna Park Arena in Buenos Aires, Argentina.

== Critical reception ==
In a positive review, Gabriel Hernando of La Nación wrote: "throughout the twelve tracks, Brava exposes the evolution of Lali [and] the definitiveness that third albums usually have for every artists of the music industry". The album has been described as an "incredible collection of innovative hits that reflect [Lali's] huge musical growth as both singer and songwriter," and that she "manages to dazzle the audience with her well-known talent for pop, adding impeccable incursions into the urban scene."

== Musical content ==
=== Singles ===
The album's lead single, "Una Na", was released on 28 July 2017, while its music video premiered two months later, on 20 September. The song merges her pop characteristic with urban rhythms to achieve a fresh and different sound. It tells a love story, with the message that "once you start feeling something for someone, after that first sight, it's very difficult to go back and forget it, so you want to go deep with that story". The song peaked at number one on the Argentina National Songs chart and at number eleven on the Argentina Airplay chart. It also entered the Mexico Espanol Airplay chart, as well as many Latin American year-end charts.

After premiering it at her Lali en Vivo tour in November, Espósito released the trap-pop song "Tu Novia" as the album's second single. However, the song was never sent to radio. It plays with Auto-Tune, libertinism and trap rhythms. "Tu Novia" is about freedom, but from a more provocative and fun perspective, it shows the beauty, sensuality and power of women.

"100 Grados", featuring Peruvian/American singer A. Chal, was released on 13 April 2018 alongside its music video. It has been described as "a sweet midtempo love song," and as a "mature and infectious composition, different from the traditional formulas and imposing [Lali's] personal impront." It peaked at number thirty-eight on the Billboard Mexico Airplay chart, at number nineteen on the Argentina Airplay chart, and entered other Latin American charts, including Uruguay, Paraguay and Ecuador.

The fourth single before the album release, "Besarte Mucho", was released on 20 July 2018, along with its music video. The song fuses the sounds of bolero, salsa, trap, pop, and a hint of bachata, in a declaration of love that describes her current sentimental state. As she explained, "It's that interesting mix of traditional rhythms from our culture and making it modern."

For the album's fifth single, "Sin Querer Queriendo", Lali teamed up with Mau y Ricky. The song has been described as "a guaranteed hit that promises great radio play." Lali had previously worked with the duo on the smash-hit "Mi Mala (Remix)", which also features Becky G, Leslie Grace and Karol G. The music video made its premiere on 24 August 2018, after the first show of Lali's Brava Tour, in which Mau y Ricky appeared as special guests to perform the song. It peaked at number 14 on the Billboard Argentina Hot 100.

On 2 October, Lali announced that "Caliente" featuring vocals by Brazilian singer Pabllo Vittar was going to be the next single from the album. According to Jessica Roiz of Billboard, the song shows everything Lali and Pabllo portray through their music: fierceness, sexiness, and girl power. It peaked at number 51 on the Billboard Argentina Hot 100.

On 31 March 2019, Lali announced that "Somos Amantes" will be the last single off Brava. Suzette Fernandez of Billboard magazine described the song as "a fun urban/pop track with a catchy lyric mixed with a touch of sexiness."

=== Promotional single ===
A promotional single, "Tu Sonrisa", was released as a Christmas gift on 24 December 2017, along with a tour video. The song had been previously presented in a show at the Luna Park Arena on 3 November 2017. It is a "minimalistic" folk that consists on a chord progression and harmonica, and lyrics dedicated to her grandparents, or as she said, "her parents' parents".

=== Songs ===
The opening track, "OMG!", combines some flashes of Spanglish with a variety of modern grooves and tricks thanks to guitarist and music producer Peter Akselrad, in an orchestration thought of for future choreographies. "Somos Amantes", the fourth title, consists of a dembow that dances on sampled vocals and clean guitars played with staccato. Spanish singer Abraham Mateo appears as the first featured artist in "Salvaje", a midtempo and a potential hit for Latin America. The seventh track Brava, "Caliente", is an upbeat song that features Brazilian singer and drag queen Pabllo Vittar. It raises the tempo and combines Latin sounds with Brazilian Carnival vibes.

The ninth title is "Vuelve a Mí". It starts simply with a piano and vocals, following the path of her older ballads. Between the 1980s'-sounding keyboard, a guitar solo at the end, voices with vocoders, and an ambitious audio treatment, this song at moments reminds of The Chainsmokers. The eleventh track, "Mi Última Canción", features Mexican band Reik. It combines their romantic pop vocals with urban melodies that make [one] dance and think about [one's] love life at the same time. The song is described as Lali's most exportable material, as it "could help [Lali] bolster a place in the Northern Hemisphere".

== Accolades ==
Awards
Year	Organization	Award	Result	Ref.
2019	Gardel Awards	Best Female Pop Album	Won	
2019	Gardel Awards	Best Cover Design	Won	

== Track listing ==
Standard edition
No.	Title	Writer(s)	Producer(s)	Length
1.	"OMG!"	Mariana Espósito; Pablo Akselrad; Luis Burgio; Gustavo Novello	3musica	3:56
2.	"Tu Novia"	Espósito; Akselrad; Burgio; Novello	3musica	3:22
3.	"Besarte Mucho"	Espósito; Akselrad; Burgio; Novello	3musica	3:18
4.	"Somos Amantes"	Espósito; Akselrad; Burgio; Novello	3musica	3:29
5.	"Salvaje" (featuring Abraham Mateo)	Espósito; Abraham Mateo Chamorro; Eric Perez; Luis O'Neill; Jadan Andino; Armando Lozano; Akselrad; Burgio; Novello	Abraham Mateo; Luis O'Neill	2:37
6.	"100 Grados" (featuring A. Chal)	Espósito; Akselrad; Burgio; Jowan Espinosa; Daniel Giraldo; Kevin Mauricio Jiménez; Novello; Alejandro Patiño; Juan Pablo Piedrahita; Andrés David Restrepo; Stiven Rojas; Alejandro Salazar; Bryan Snaider Lezcano; Salomón Villada Hoyos	3musica; Rude Boyz; Icon Music^{[a]}	3:24
7.	"Caliente" (featuring Pabllo Vittar)	Espósito; Arthur Marques; Pablo Bispo; Rodrigo Gorky; Akselrad; Burgio; Novello	3musica	3:12
8.	"Una Na"	Espósito; Andy Clay; Akselrad; Burgio; Novello	3musica	3:46
9.	"Vuelve a Mi"	Espósito; Akselrad; Burgio; Novello	3musica	4:14
10.	"Sin Querer Queriendo" (featuring Mau y Ricky)	Espósito; Stephen McGregor; Mauricio Montaner; Ricardo Montaner; Camilo Echeverry; Jon Leone; Akselrad; Burgio; Novello	Di Genius; Ricky Montaner; Jon Leone	3:48
11.	"Mi Última Canción" (featuring Reik)	Jesús Navarro; Julio Ramírez; Andrés Torres; Mauricio Rengifo	3musica; Haze	3:39
12.	"Tu Sonrisa"	Espósito; Akselrad; Burgio; Novello	3musica	3:33
Total length:				42:07

Notes

- ^{^[a]} signifies a co-producer

== Personnel ==
The following people contributed to Brava:

- Lali Espósito – primary artist, composer, lead vocals
- Abraham Mateo – featured artist, composer, producer
- A. Chal – featured artist, composer
- Pabllo Vittar – featured artist
- Mau y Ricky – featured artist
- Reik – featured artist
- Di Genius – composer, producer
- Mauricio Rengifo – composer
- Andrés Torres – composer
- Gustavo Novello – composer, production, keyboards, engineer, bass
- Pablo Akserlad – composer, production, guitar
- Luis Burgio – composer, production, drums
- Josefina Silveyra – background vocals
- Stefania Romero – background vocals
- Antonella Giunta – background vocals
- Facundo Yalve – guitar, engineer
- Earcandy – mixing
- Luis O'Neill – composer, producer
- Eric Perez – composer
- Jadan Andino – composer
- Armando Lozano – composer
- Mosty – composer, producer
- Feid – composer, producer
- Rolo – composer, producer
- Miky La Sensa – composer
- Bryan Snaider Lezcano – composer
- Daniel Giraldo – composer
- Kevin ADG – composer
- Juan Pablo Piedrahita – composer
- Jowan Espinosa – composer
- Rude Boyz – producer
- Maffalda – composer
- Rodrigo Gorky – composer
- Pablo Bispo – composer
- Andy Clay – composer
- Nicolás Kalwill – mastering
- Tomás Ruiz – engineer
- Ricky Montaner – composer, producer
- Jon Leone – composer, producer
- Mau Montaner – composer
- Camilo Echeverry – composer
- Jesús Navarro – composer
- Julio Ramírez – composer
- Haze – producer, keyboards
- Ervin Quiroz – engineer
- Dylan Del Olmo – engineer

== Charts ==
Chart (2018)	Peak position
Argentine Albums (CAPIF)	2
Uruguayan Albums (CUD)	3

== Certifications ==
Region	Certification	Certified units/sales
Argentina (CAPIF)	4× Platinum	80,000^{^}
^{^} Shipments figures based on certification alone.

== Release history ==
List of release dates, formats, label and reference
Region	Date	Format(s)	Label	Ref.
Various	10 August 2018	Digital download	Sony Music Entertainment	
Argentina	10 August 2018	CD	Sony Music Entertainment	
Chile	27 September 2018	CD	Sony Music Entertainment	
Mexico	5 October 2018	CD	Sony Music Entertainment	
Uruguay	5 October 2018	CD	Sony Music Entertainment	
