= Una Na =

Single by Lali

from the album Brava
- Released: July 28, 2017
- Genre: Latin pop
- Length: 3:46
- Label: Sony Argentina
- Songwriters: Mariana Espósito; Andy Clay; Peter Akselrad; Luis Burgio; Nano Novello
- Producer: 3musica

Lali singles chronology
"Roma-Bangkok" (2017)	"Una Na" (2017)	"Tu Novia" (2017)

"Una Na" is a song recorded by Argentine singer Lali. She co-wrote the song with Cuban songwriter Andy Clay and its producers Peter Akselrad, Luis Burgio and Nano Novello, from the production company 3musica. It was released on July 28, 2017, through Sony Music Argentina, as the first single from her third studio album, Brava. The song became the Espósito's second No. 1 hit on the Argentina Lista 40

== Composition ==
"Una Na" was co-written by Espósito, Cuban songwriter Andy Clay, and producers Peter Akselrad, Luis Burgio and Gustavo Novello. It was produced, arranged and recorded by 3musica, and mixed by EarCandy. The song merges her pop characteristic with urban rhythms to achieve a fresh and different sound. The singer explained to Infobae that "Una Na" tells a love story, with the message "once you start feeling something for someone after that first sight, it's very difficult to go back and forget it, so you want to go deep with that story", making reference to her relationship with her boyfriend and music producer Santiago Mocorrea. The song was originally going to be titled "Una y Otra Vez" (English: "Once and Again"), but was later changed to "Una Na", repeating the last two letters of the word "Una". According to the singer, this makes the title more original.

== Background and release ==
In May 2017, Espósito confirmed that she had begun working on her new material and revealed the title of a new single called "Sin Enamorarnos". In July 2017, the singer published a series of videos via Instagram, announcing the release of "Una Na", which replaced the previously announced one as the lead single from her upcoming third studio album. The song was born in a jam session with Cuban producer Andy Clay in March 2017, when Espósito was promoting her previous single "Ego" in Miami, Florida.

== Music video ==
Directed by Juan Ripari, the music video made its premiere on September 20, 2017 at midnight on Vevo. Hours before, scenes from the music video could be seen on advertising screens all around Buenos Aires, announcing its release. The video was shot in the Calchaquí Valleys in Salta Province, Argentina. Through different scenarios (hills, valleys, desert, highways and a tourquoise convertible), Lali shows her talent as dancer posing with multiple looks.

== Live performances ==
Espósito performed her first televised performance of "Una Na" at Susana Giménez, on August 6, 2017. On September 5, 2017, the singer performed the song at the Faena Arts Center for the 20th anniversary of E! Latin America. Espósito also performed "Una Na" at the 2017 Kids' Choice Awards Argentina, after joining Abraham Mateo onstage to perform their single "Mueve". On June 3, 2018, Espósito performed a medley of the song with "100 Grados" and "Tu Novia" at the 48th Annual Martin Fierro Awards.

== Accolades ==
For the Nickelodeon Kids' Choice Awards Argentina, "Una Na" won in the category for Favorite Song.

Year	Ceremony	Category	Result	Ref.
2017	Kids' Choice Awards Argentina	Favorite Song	Won	
2018	Quiero Awards	Best Female Video	Nominated	

== Credits and personnel ==
Credits adapted from Tidal.

- Lali Espósito – songwriting, vocals
- Andy Clay – songwriting
- Gustavo Novelo – songwriting, production, keyboard, bass, guitar, record engineering
- Peter Akselrad – songwriting, production, guitar
- Luis Burgio – songwriting, production, drums
- Stefania Romero – background vocals
- Antonella Giunta – background vocals
- Earcandy – mixing
- Nicolás Kalwill – mastering
- Tomás Ruiz – record engineering

== Charts ==
=== Weekly charts ===
Chart (2017)	Peak position
Argentina (Monitor Latino)	11
Argentina Latin (Monitor Latino)	9
Argentina National Songs (Monitor Latino)	1
Mexico Espanol Airplay (Billboard)	34
Uruguay (Monitor Latino)	8

=== Year-end charts ===
Chart (2017)	Position
Argentina (Monitor Latino)	89
Argentina Latin (Monitor Latino)	61
Ecuador Pop (Monitor Latino)	89
Panama Pop (Monitor Latino)	94
Uruguay (Monitor Latino)	90
Venezuela Pop (Monitor Latino)	98

Chart (2018)	Position
Argentina Latin (Monitor Latino)	90

== Release history ==
Region	Date	Format(s)	Label(s)	Ref.
Various	July 28, 2017	Digital download	Sony Argentina	

== See also ==
- List of airplay number-one hits of the 2010s (Argentina)
