= El Negreeto =

Studio album by Akon
- Released: October 4, 2019
- Genres: Bachata; merengue; reggaeton
- Length: 27:41
- Languages: Spanish; English
- Labels: Akonik; BMG
- Producers: Akon; Camilo Echeverry; IAmChino; Jimmy Joker; Jon Leone; Maffio; Matthew Weiss; Mau y Ricky A&R Hiro "HirOshima" Oshima

Akon chronology
Freedom (2008)	El Negreeto (2019)	Akonda (2019)

Singles from El Negreeto
- 1. "Cómo No" Released: September 6, 2019; 2. "Te Quiero Amar" Released: April 2, 2020; 3. "Sólo Tú" Released: June 17, 2020

El Negreeto (English: The Black One) is the fourth studio album by Senegalese-American singer-songwriter Akon, released on October 4, 2019, by his record label Akonik Label Group, under exclusive license to BMG Rights Management. It is his first studio album in 11 years since Freedom (2008). The album serves as his first Spanish-language album and features guest appearances from Farruko, Becky G, Anitta, and Pitbull, while the production was led by Akon himself, alongside a variety of producers such as Camilo Echeverry, Jimmy Joker, IAmChino, Mau y Ricky, Jon Leone and Maffio.

Upon release, El Negreeto entered the US Billboard Latin Album Sales chart, becoming Akon's first album to not reach the Billboard 200. The album is one of the three-part series of albums by Akon; its follow-up, Akonda was released on October 25, while the third album Konnect was slated for December but was not released.

== Background ==
Akon announced in 2019 that he had founded an independent record label Akonik Label Group, comprising four separate sublabels: Akonda (Afrobeats), Akonik (United States), Ke Lo Ke (Latin America), and Jamakon (Caribbean) and that he was to release four albums later in the year. He announced plans of releasing a Latin album El Negreeto, an Afrobeats album Akonda, and a hip hop and R&B album Konnect. He also announced his intention to finish this off by releasing a collaborative album The Konnection, which will include guest artists such as Nicki Minaj, Pitbull and Ty Dolla Sign, among others. However Konnect was never released, and The Konnection ended up being scrapped.

El Negreeto was scheduled for release on August 31, 2019, but was delayed to October 4, 2019. The album's track listing was revealed by Billboard on October 2, 2019.

== Singles ==
The album's first and only promotional single, "Get Money", featuring guest vocals from Puerto Rican rapper Anuel AA, was released on May 24, 2019. An accompanying music video was released on that same date, and has garnered 11.5 million views as of May 2020.

The album's lead single, "Cómo No", featuring guest vocals from Mexican American singer Becky G, was released on September 6, 2019, with an accompanying music video being broadcast in Times Square. The music video has since garnered over 45 million views as of May 2020. They performed the song live for the first time at the 2019 MTV Europe Music Awards.

The album's second single, "Te Quiero Amar" featuring Cuban American rapper Pitbull, was released on April 2, 2020. An accompanying music video was released that same date, and has garnered over 10.5 million views as of May 2020. A radio version of the single with different vocals from Akon was sent to radios on that same date as well.

The album's third single, "Sólo Tú" featuring Puerto Rican singer Farruko, was released on June 17, 2020, with an accompanying music video with over 8.8 million views as of August 2020. The music video switches Akon's and Farruko's verses from the original audio.

== Track listing ==
El Negreeto track listing
No.	Title	Writer(s)	Producer(s)	Length
1.	"Te Quiero Amar" (featuring Pitbull)	Aliaune Thiam; Armando C. Pérez; Carlos Mendoza; Daniel Santacruz; Yulien Oviedo	Maffio	3:46
2.	"Báilame Lento"	Thiam; Mendoza; Jimmy Paul Thornfeldt; Jorge Gomez; Jose Garcia; Yulien Oviedo	IAmChino; Jimmy Joker; Maffio	4:02
3.	"Cómo No" (featuring Becky G)	Thiam; Rebbeca Gomez; Mauricio Montaner; Ricky Montaner; Jon Leone; Camilo Echeverry; Mendoza	Mau y Ricky; Jon Leone; Camilo Echeverry; Maffio	3:13
4.	"Boom, Boom" (featuring Anitta)	Alejanda Alberti; Thiam; Mendoza; Erika Ender; Karloff Gaitan; Larissa Machado	Akon; Maffio	2:32
5.	"Dile"	Thiam; Mendoza; Milton Restituyo; Richard Pena	Maffio; Matthew Weiss	3:12
6.	"Innocente"	Thiam; Mendoza; Miguel Duran Jr.; Pedro Polanco	Maffio	3:24
7.	"Sólo Tú" (featuring Farruko)	Thiam; Mendoza; Carlos Rosado	Matthew Weiss; Maffio	3:41
8.	"Baila Conmigo"	Thiam; Mendoza; Isreal Palma; Yonathan Then	Maffio	3:51
Total length:				27:41

== Charts ==
Chart performance for El Negreeto
Chart (2019)	Peak position
US Billboard Latin Album Sales	12
