= Me Traicionaste =

2019 song by Rosalía featuring A. Chal

Song by Rosalía featuring A. Chal

from the album For the Throne: Music Inspired by the HBO Series Game of Thrones
- Language: Spanish; English
- English title: You Betrayed Me
- Released: April 26, 2019
- Recorded: 2019
- Genre: Dark pop
- Length: 2:46
- Label: Columbia
- Songwriter(s): Pablo Díaz Reixa; Rosalía Vila Tobella; Alejandro Salazar
- Producer(s): El Guincho; Rosalía

For the Throne: Music Inspired by the HBO Series Game of Thrones chronology
"From the Grave (8)"	"Me Traicionaste"	"When I Lie (Remix) (10)"

"Me Traicionaste" is a song recorded by Spanish singer Rosalía and Peruvian singer-songwriter A. Chal. It was released on April 26, 2019, through Columbia Records simultaneously with the Game of Thrones companion soundtrack, For the Throne: Music Inspired by the HBO Series.

== Background ==
On April 9, 2019, it was announced that the iconic HBO show Game of Thrones would have its own companion soundtrack. The soundtrack was set to be released on April 26, 2019, two weeks later than the show's eighth season premiere.

== Critical reception ==
Ryan Dombal of Pitchfork praised the track and Rosalía's performance in an otherwise highly negative review of its parent album, stating that it "offers a dark, piercing sensuality" and "comes close to matching the shadowy Game of Thrones mood millions have fallen for," but was highly critical of A. Chal's "pointless" verse. Danny Schwartz of Highsnobiety expressed a similar sentiment, writing that the Peruvian rapper spoiled the lead artist's "exquisite flamenco". Stefanie Fernández, writing for NPR, called the track a "soundtrack standout" due to its production and "uncanny relevance to Arya Stark and her kill list", while Billboard's Judy Cantor-Navas described it as "darkly intriguing." GQ placed the song on its weekly best songs list, with Colin Groundwater calling it a "solid slow burner that continues the Spanish pop star's winning streak."

== Charts ==
Chart performance for "Me Traicionaste"
Chart (2019)	Peak position
Spain (PROMUSICAE)	70

== Release history ==
Region	Date	Format	Label(s)
United States	April 26, 2019	Digital download; streaming	Columbia
