= Tess (singer) =

Réunionese singer-songwriter (born 1994)

- Born: Tess Océane Joffroy; 1994 (age 30–31); Saint-Denis, Réunion
- Occupation: Singer-songwriter
- Years active: 2013–present
- Musical career
- Origin: Réunion, France
- Genres: Electropop
- Instruments: Vocals; guitar
- Labels: Choke Industry; Independent; Polydor
- Website: tessofficial.com

Tess Océane Joffroy (born 1994) is a Réunionese singer-songwriter. After posting song covers on Facebook and YouTube, she was discovered by Lilly Wood and the Prick's manager and producer. He signed Tess to record label Choke Industry and she later signed another record deal with Polydor Records. Her first extended play (EP), Tess (2016), peaked at number 145 on the French singles chart. It was supported by the single "Love Gun", which reached number 131 on the same record chart.

== Life and career ==
Tess Océane Joffroy was born in 1994 in Saint-Denis, Réunion. Her mother is Réunionese and her father is French. She took dance classes when she was 4 and she practiced guitar when she was 14 for 3 years. At 15, Tess began writing songs. She started uploading song covers on Facebook for her friends and later on YouTube. On the latter platform, she was noticed by the French music duo Lilly Wood and the Prick's manager and producer Pierre Guimard in 2013 after she posted a cover of the duo's single "Prayer in C". While she was holidaying in Paris in 2014, he invited her to a music studio in the city where they both began working on her first extended play (EP), Tess. Soon after, Guimard signed Tess to the label Choke Industry after listening to her compositions. She also signed a record deal with Polydor Records. To pursue her career, Tess moved to Biscarrosse and split her time between Biscarrosse and Paris.

Tess released her first single "Endlessly" in 2015. She briefly performed as Tess Zucchini after releasing it and she was an opening act for Israeli-French singer Tal at Stade Jean-Ivoula. Tess studied physical therapy in Saint-Pierre, Réunion and obtained her degree in 2016. She worked as a physical therapist for only one month in Réunion and after she relocated to France, she chose to "put [her degree] aside" so she could "devote [herself] to music". Her second single, "Love Gun", was released in June 2016. It reached number 131 on the French singles chart. Also in June, she sang at music festival Sakifo Musik Festival. In December 2016, she re-released "Endlessly" alongside Peruvian singer A. Chal. Tess was digitally released on 20 January 2016 by Choke Industry, although it was re-released on the same date in 2017 by Polydor. The EP peaked at number 145 on the French singles chart. In April 2017, Tess performed at Lollapalooza France. She sang at the opening of shopping center Cap Sacré-Cœur in November 2018. Her first album, Scars and the Moon, was released on 21 December 2019 by Choke Industry. The aforementioned label distributed Tess's second EP, Origin, on 7 May 2021. Tess moved back to Réunion after living for two years in France and she began teaching yoga. Tess released her second album, 11:11, independently on 11 November 2022.

== Artistry ==
Music critics labelled Tess's main sound as electropop, containing elements of pop and R&B. Her musical influences are Lorde and The Weeknd. Tess's music has been compared to that of artists Bat for Lashes, Björk, Ellie Goulding, Grimes, Hannah Reid, Hyphen Hyphen, Jain, The Knife, and MØ. Elle's Florence Tredez called Tess the "new electropop sensation". France Télévisions named her a "breath of fresh air on French pop". Laura Philippon of La Première, wrote that Tess has a "bewitching, deep, sometimes hurt" voice with which she "creates powerful and thrilling melodies". Les Inrockuptibles writer Morane Aubert described her voice as "soft and sensual". Reviewing "Hard to Forget", Billboard's Bryan Kress noted that the song allows Tess "to showcase her vocal abilities" which are "equally sultry and pop-ready".

== Discography ==
=== Studio albums ===
List of studio albums
Title	Album details
Scars and the Moon	Release date: 20 December 2019; Label: Choke Industry; Formats: Digital download, streaming
11:11	Release date: 11 November 2022; Label: Independent; Formats: Digital download, streaming

=== Extended plays ===
List of extended plays, with selected chart positions
Title	EP details	Peak chart positions
Title	EP details	FRA
Tess	Release date: 20 January 2016; Label: Choke Industry, Polydor; Formats: Digital download, streaming	145
Origin	Release date: 7 May 2021; Label: Choke Industry; Formats: Digital download, streaming	—
"—" denotes a release that did not chart or was not released in that territory.

=== Singles ===
List of singles, with selected chart positions
Title	Year	Peak chart positions	Album
Title	Year	FRA	Album
"Endlessly" (solo or featuring A. Chal)	2015	—	Tess / Scars and the Moon
"Love Gun"	2016	131	Tess / Scars and the Moon
"Hard to Forget"	2017	—	Tess / Scars and the Moon
"Dark but Beautiful"	2018	—	Non-album single
"The Lake"	2019	—	Scars and the Moon
"Poison"	2019	—	Scars and the Moon
"It's You"	2022	—	Non-album single
"Time Stops"	2022	—	11:11
"Ynyb"	2022	—	11:11
"Not Human"	2022	—	11:11
"Royaume (The Silent Princess)"	2022	—	11:11
"Kali"	2022	—	Non-album singles
"My Tender Love"	2022	—	Non-album singles
"New Moon"	2023	—	Non-album singles
"Comme un soleil"	2023	—	Non-album singles
"—" denotes a release that did not chart or was not released in that territory.
