= Soy (Lali album) =

Studio album by Lali
- Released: 20 May 2016
- Recorded: 2016
- Studios: 3musica Estudios (Buenos Aires); Hit Factory Criteria (Miami); La Urraca (Buenos Aires); Tónica Estudios (Buenos Aires); Earcandy Studios (Orlando)
- Genres: Pop; R&B; dance-pop; dubstep; reggae
- Length: 47:51
- Label: Sony Argentina
- Producers: 3musica; Will Simm; Tobias Lundgren; Johan Fransson; Tim Larsson; Michael Angelo

Lali chronology
A Bailar (2014)	Soy (2016)	Brava (2018)

Singles from Soy
- 1. "Soy" Released: 5 May 2016; 2. "Boomerang" Released: 4 September 2016; 3. "Ego" Released: 14 December 2016

Soy is the second studio album by Argentine singer Lali. It was released on 20 May 2016 by Sony Music Entertainment Argentina. The album is the follow-up to her debut studio album A Bailar (2014). The album's lead single and title track "Soy" was released on 5 May 2016. It received a nomination for Best Female Pop Album at the 2017 Gardel Awards.

== Background ==
In an interview with Argentine newspaper La Nación in June 2015, Espósito confirmed that she had begun working on her sophomore studio album while she was touring with her A Bailar Tour and between Esperanza mía's shootings. In the same interview, the singer stated: "This second album squeezes a little more on everything, in hip-hop and dance [genres]; it is more definited. It will be such a rhythmic album, bound to dance, but I have used that title already [A Bailar]." In an interview for Rolling Stone magazine, Espósito admitted: "I'm very into the soul and gospel music, but I also want to trighten nuts on the dance and hip-hop music because the performances in my shows are a very important part". After a little holiday the first days of 2016, Espósito started recording the album and in April that same year, she traveled to Miami to mix it at The Hit Factory Criteria. In an interview with Intrusos, Espósito said: "There are some things that are related with my relationship with Mariano [Martínez] and some other things with my previous relationship [with Benjamín Amadeo]. Every single track has something. The album is called Soy because I am sharing the truth about what I think and feel. It is super personal." About the album, Espósito stated: "It is living meat, these are the songs that I wrote, it is just something that I had been waiting for a while". In an interview with El Telégrafo, Espósito admitted that twenty songs were written but only thirteen of them were included in the album. As regarding to the seven excluded tracks, Espósito didn't discard the possibility of include them on a deluxe edition or on her next album.

== Release and promotion ==
On 28 April, Espósito revealed the title and album cover in a fan trivia competition. The album pre-sale started on 2 May 2016. The album launch party took place on 20 May 2016 and was an exclusive event for 1,000 of those who had purchased the album on the pre-sale. To promote the album, Espósito made a few interviews in radio and television programs. A few hours after its release, the album was certified gold by the Argentine Chamber of Phonograms and Videograms Producers (CAPIF) for selling over 20,000 copies in Argentina. Soy reached the No. 1 position on the iTunes charts of Argentina and Paraguay, and charted within the Top 5 on iTunes of countries like Colombia, Peru, Israel and Spain. In the United States, the album peaked at No. 4 on the Latin iTunes chart.

=== Tour ===
Espósito announced the dates for the first leg of the Soy Tour on 27 May 2016. The tour began on 8 September 2016 in Buenos Aires, Argentina and has travelled across Latin America, Europe and the Middle East. For the fifth leg of the tour, Espósito renamed the tour to "Lali en Vivo" due to all the changes that the show had suffered. This renewed tour began in November 2017 with two sold-out shows at the Luna Park Arena in Buenos Aires. She also served as an opening act for various international acts, including Katy Perry on her Witness: The Tour and girlband Fifth Harmony on their 7/27 Tour.

== Critical reception ==
Professional ratings
Review scores
Source	Rating
Viva Latin Pop	4.5/5 stars
Popfection	6.7/10 stars

The album received "the best reviews from the critics". Jorge Luis Santa María from the Mexican website Digitall Post summarized that Soy "is an album that shows her [Espósito] as she is without barriers, and includes stories that a person of her age can actually live or see". Belén Fourment from the Uruguayan journal El País opined that "even though there is some schizophrenia in Soy because it jumps from one genre to another without cushioning the fall, Espósito takes one more step with this album, she experiments, shows herself as she is, and that is always valuable" In the same review, it is said that the album has an "electropop sound, with very explosive passages and some distorted guitars that slips, but also has some striking turns".

Jenny Morgan from Viva Latin Pop reviewed that "the album flows between a range of genres that include dance, club, pop, rock, and soul" and that "Lali’s vocal range blends well with all the genres she includes on this album". The reviewer also compared Espósito's sound with Belinda's but "with a better voice". Morgan ensured that the singer "will be breaking records with this release" and gave the album four and a half from five stars. Billboard Brasil named Soy as one of best 30 albums of 2016, and stated that it is "a very diverse album that does not lack anything".

Popfection's reviewer Dan highlighted Espósito's "chameleonic" voice through the record, and alluded to its production, writing: "it has been produced so badly that you cannot even find the bass frequencies in the mixes". For him, the fault of this is of the "inexperienced or straight up bad producers" and the "economic limitations" that Sony Music Argentina might face in order to finance an album. The reviewer concluded that "Lali has a lot of potential" but "a better team behind the making of the record would most definitely help", and gave the album six and a seventh stars out of 10.

=== Year-end lists ===
Publication	List	Rank
Billboard Brasil	30 Best Albums of 2016	N/A
Crónica Musical	Best Pop Albums of 2016	5

=== Accolades ===
The album received a nomination for Best Female Pop Album at the 19th Annual Gardel Awards. Espósito had won in this category at the 17th Annual Gardel Awards for A Bailar.

== Commercial performance ==
In Argentina, Soy debuted at No. 1 and was certified Gold by the Argentine Chamber of Phonograms and Videograms Producers three hours after its release for album sales equivalent of 20,000 units. In Uruguay, the album debuted at No. 1 and stayed in the top for four months. On 6 December 2016, Soy was certified Gold by the Uruguayan Disc Chamber for selling over 2,000 units.

In Italy, the album debuted at No. 5 and was the highest-charting non-Italian album of the week. Soy debuted at No. 6 in Spain and at No. 82 in Mexico, where it eventually peaked at No. 27.

== Musical content ==
=== Singles ===
The lead single and title track "Soy" was released as a surprise on 5 May 2016, along with the pre-sale of the album. Espósito said that the song is "a simple but deep definition to understand what it means to be oneself." She added that "[The lyrics] are my thoughts, my joys, my pains, stories and beliefs made song; music that makes us feel alive, that makes us be". The song peaked at No. 5 on the Argentina National Top 20 and at No. 15 on the Ecuador Pop 20, both provided by Monitor Latino.

On 4 September 2016, "Boomerang" was sent to radio as the second single off the album. The song is described as a karmic way of seeing things from the concept that everything returns. Santiago Torres from Billboard Argentina described the song as "of the album's most modern material" and named it "an insured hit due to its funny tune".

"Ego" was released as the third single off Soy on 14 December 2016. Its music video was shot in Villa La Angostura, Argentina in early November. The song has been compared with the previous promotional single "Unico" as not directly compatible compositions, but it was said that they both clearly reflect the life moments of a girl who still encourages to write, but now from a more intimate place. The song peaked at No. 4 and No. 15 on the Monitor Latino's Argentina National Top 20 and Argentina Latin Top 20 charts, respectively.

=== Promotional singles ===
"Unico" was released as a promotional single on 20 March 2016. The song was intended to be the lead single off Soy, but then it was changed to "Soy". Espósito had performed the song before its release at two previous shows of her A Bailar Tour in Buenos Aires on 18 and 19 March. The song peaked at No. 5 in Paraguay and at No. 23 in Ecuador. Espósito stated that "Unico" is about "Some loves [that] are so deep and crucial that deserve to be heard as one, different and that have changed our heart[s]." The singer also admitted that the song was written to her ex-boyfriend Benjamín Amadeo by saying that "Unico is for the one who changed my way of seeing the world. Such was this love that it let me fly even though [I] was suffering. [It was] a unique love that I will always remember as a big truth. Personally, it [the song] is for person with whom I shared years of my life, real life. Unico is for everyone who loves beyond saying goodbye".

The second promotional single, "Tu Revolución", was released on 21 December 2016. The song is described as a 3.0 dubstep in which Espósito risks herself with a less self-look and tries to send to her young public a reflexive message. Belén Fourment from El País said that the song is "a valuable effort, especially for the supposed superficiality of her firsts songs [the A Bailar ones]".

=== Songs ===
"Mi Religión", the eighth track of the album, and "Soy" are said the most personal songs of the album. "Amor es presente" is downtempo ballad with a gospel influence and some pop arrangements that remind us to Bandana's style. The last track of the album, "Reina", is a tribute to the British rock band Queen, which is one of Espósito's biggest influences. "The song reminds us to Queen's Bohemian Rhapsody as it has a guitar solo similar to Brian May's style."

"Ego", "Boomerang" and "Ring Na Na", the fifth, sixth and eleventh tracks respectively, are the only tracks that counted with co-writers on its composition, Gavin Jones, Tobias Lundgren, Johan Fransson and Tim Larsson in the first one, Will Simm and Ayak Thiik in "Boomerang", and Michael Angelo, Eric McCarthy and David Kaneswaran in the eleventh track, aside from Espósito and her producers, Gustavo Novello, Pablo Akselrad and Luis Burgio. The last one is described as a love song that distinguishes between a dancehall style and a sexy pop. It has been compared to Nicki Minaj's EDM sound on her album Pink Friday: Roman Reloaded. Meanwhile, "Lejos de Mí" is described as "a kick ass strong song that almost overpowers everything else on the album" by Jenny Morgan from Pop en Español. The reviewer also compared the song with Mónica Naranjo's "rock opera style of music" in 4.0. In a review for Popfection, Espósito's highs during the chorus of "Irresistible" were compared to the ones by Mariah Carey's in "Emotions", while "Cree en Mí" was praised for combining both an amazing vocal delivery and perfect amount of drama with a catchy melody. Both songs were listed as "essentials".

== Track listing ==
Soy – Standard edition
No.	Title	Writer(s)	Producer(s)	Length
1.	"Soy"	Mariana Espósito; Gustavo Novello; Pablo Akselrad; Luis Burgio	3musica	3:31
2.	"Unico"	Espósito; Novello; Akselrad; Burgio	3musica	3:42
3.	"Tu Revolución"	Espósito; Novello; Akselrad; Burgio	3musica	3:48
4.	"Cree en Mí"	Espósito; Novello; Akselrad; Burgio	3musica	3:53
5.	"Irresistible"	Espósito; Novello; Akselrad; Burgio	3musica	3:22
6.	"Ego"	Gavin Jones; Tobias Lundgren; Johan Fransson; Tim Larsson; Espósito; Novello; Akselrad; Burgio	Tobias Lundgren; Johan Fransson; Tim Larsson	3:51
7.	"Boomerang"	Will Simm; Ayak Thiik; Espósito; Novello; Akselrad; Burgio	3musica; Will Simm	4:26
8.	"Mi Religión"	Espósito; Novello; Akselrad; Burgio	3musica	4:04
9.	"Lejos de Mí"	Espósito; Novello; Akselrad; Burgio	3musica	4:05
10.	"Amor Es Presente"	Espósito; Novello; Akselrad; Burgio	3musica	3:12
11.	"Ring Na Na"	Eric McCarthy; David Kaneswaran; Espósito; Novello; Akselrad; Burgio; Michael Angelo	Michael Angelo	3:49
12.	"Bomba"	Espósito; Novello; Akselrad; Burgio	3musica	2:54
13.	"Reina"	Espósito; Novello; Akselrad; Burgio	3musica	3:37
Total length:				47:51

Soy — Vinyl edition
No.	Title	Writer(s)	Producer(s)	Length
12.	"Reina"	Espósito; Novello; Akselrad; Burgio	3musica	3:37
Total length:				45:57

== Chart performance ==
=== Weekly charts ===
Chart (2016)	Peak position
Argentine Albums (CAPIF)	1
Israel Albums (IFPI)	1
Italian Albums (FIMI)	5
Mexican Albums (AMPROFON)	11
Peru Top 100 (UNIMPRO)	31
Spanish Albums (Promusicae)	6
Venezuela Albums (AVINPRO)	1

=== Monthly charts ===
Chart (2016)	Position
Argentine Albums (CAPIF)	1
Uruguayan Albums (CUD)	1

=== Year-end charts ===
Chart (2020)	Position
Uruguayan Albums (CUD)	15

== Certifications ==
Region	Certification	Certified units/sales
Argentina (CAPIF)	Gold	20,000^{^}
Uruguay (CUD)	Gold	2,000^{^}
^{^} Shipments figures based on certification alone.

== Release history ==
List of release dates, label and reference
Region	Date	Version	Format(s)	Label	Ref.
Worldwide	20 May 2016	Standard edition	Digital download	Sony Music	
Argentina	20 May 2016	Standard edition	CD	Sony Music	
Uruguay	3 June 2016	Standard edition	CD	Sony Music	
Peru	10 June 2016	Standard edition	CD	Sony Music	
Venezuela	10 June 2016	Standard edition	CD	Sony Music	
Chile	15 June 2016	Standard edition	CD	Sony Music	
Costa Rica	17 June 2016	Standard edition	CD	Sony Music	
Ecuador	20 June 2016	Standard edition	CD	Sony Music	
Spain	24 June 2016	Standard edition	CD	Sony Music	
Paraguay	11 July 2016	Standard edition	CD	Sony Music	
Israel	14 July 2016	Standard edition	CD	Sony Music; NMC Music	
Mexico	15 July 2016	Standard edition	CD	Sony Music	
Italy	16 September 2016	Standard edition	CD	Sony Music; Ariola	
El Salvador	11 November 2016	Standard edition	CD	Sony Music	
Argentina	30 November 2016	Standard edition	LP	Sony Music	

== Credits and personnel ==
The following people contributed to Soy:

- Nano Novello – engineer, musical direction, production, management, booking, composer, piano, programming, bass, guitar
- Facundo Yalve – engineer
- Dario Calequi – engineer
- Julián Burgio – assistant
- Emilio Oivero – master tune
- Tobias Lundgren – engineer, production, composer, background vocals
- Johan Fransson – engineer, production, composer, violin
- Tim Larsson – engineer, production, composer, programming, drums
- Will Simm – engineer, production, composer, drums, violin, bass, synthesizers, piano, programming
- Michael Angelo – engineer, production, composer, drums, synthesizers, bass, piano, programming
- Antonella Giunta – vocal coach, background vocals
- Roberto Tito Vázquez – mixing
- Chris Gehringer – mastering
- Peter Akselrad – musical direction, production, management, booking, composer, guitar, talk box, background vocals
- Luis Burgio – musical direction, production, management, booking, composer, drums, background vocals, kazoo
- Ariel Chichotky – production, management, booking
- Pablo Durand – A&R direction
- Javier Caso – A&R
- Lali Espósito – primary artist, composer, lead vocals
- Josefina Silveyra – background vocals
- Gavin Jones – composer
- Ayak Thiik – composer
- Alan Ballan – bass
- Diego Mercado – background vocals
- Eric McCarthy – composer
- Davin Kaneswaran – composer
- Alejo von der Pahlen – sax, background vocals
- Ervin Stutz – trumpet, trombone
- Omar Souto – art direction
- Machado Cicala Morassut – photography
- Juan Manuel Cativa – hair stylist
- Marina Venancio – make-up, styling
- Geri Capucci – assistant
- Gime Catalano – nail art

== See also ==
- List of number-one albums in Argentina
- Music of Argentina
- 2016 in Latin music
