= A. Chal =

Peruvian singer-songwriter and producer

- A. Chal in Paris, 2026

Background information
- Born: Alejandro Salazar Pezo; May 30, 1989 (age 37); Lima, Peru
- Origin: Queens, New York, U.S.
- Genres: Latin trap; R&B; hip hop; chillwave; pop; soul
- Occupations: Singer; songwriter; rapper; record producer
- Instrument: Vocals
- Years active: 2011–present
- Labels: Gazi World; Empire; Epic
- Publisher: Sony
- Website: gazi.world

Alejandro Salazar Pezo (born May 30, 1986), professionally known as A. Chal (stylized A.CHAL), is a Peruvian-American singer-songwriter, rapper, and record producer. He released his first EP, Ballroom Riots, in 2013. His debut studio album, Welcome to Gazi, was self-released in June 2016. His single, "Round Whippin'", was premiered by Zane Lowe in 2015. He has performed at the Day N Nite Fest. Pigeons & Planes named him one of the best new artists in 2015.

== Early life ==
Alejandro Salazar Pezo was born in Lima, Peru, where he lived for 4 years before his family moved to Queens, New York City. His mother was from rural northern Peru. His stage name is derived from his brother's name, Ichal who died at 2 weeks old, which in turn originated from a mountain that was named after that his father grew up near in Peru, along with being closer to large Peruvian cities. He began rapping at age 12 and later started making beats and writing songs with a friend at the Museum of Science in Cambridge, Massachusetts. In 2010, he moved to Los Angeles to pursue a career as a songwriter and producer.

== Career ==
A. Chal released his debut EP, Ballroom Riots, in 2013. The album found some success, which he later signed a publishing deal with Sony/ATV Music Publishing. In June 2014, he produced the song "Never Satisfied" by American singer Jennifer Lopez, from her eighth studio album A.K.A.

=== 2015 – 2017 ===
However, after this appearance A. Chal kept low profile for two years before taking up his artistic pursuits in a highly diversified way. In 2015, he began a series of single releases, which one after another forged his community of followers.

He then spent two years out of the public spotlight before beginning to release a variety of singles in 2015. One of those singles, "Round Whippin'", was debuted online on The Fader and then followed up with a world premiere on Zane Lowe's Beats 1 channel and supported on Canadian rapper Drake's OVO Sound Radio. As a result of this publicity, A. Chal was named one of Pigeons & Planes best new artists of 2015. He also performed at the Interview Magazine event during Coachella that year.

In February 2015, he released the single "Gazi", which he co-produced with Count Justice. In September 2015, A. Chal released another a single, "Vibe W/U", which was first publicized by American rapper ASAP Rocky on his Twitter profile. In 2016, A. Chal performed at the Day N Nite Fest. He also released a few more singles before self-releasing his debut studio album, Welcome to Gazi, in June 2016. He has since premiered the official music video for "Round Whippin'" with Complex.com and been featured on tracks by Ro James, Stwo, and Tess.

On June 2, 2017, he released the single "Cuánto", featuring American rapper ASAP Nast.

=== 2018 – 2019 ===
On January 25, 2018, Alejandro released the remix of his single "Love N Hennessy", featuring American rapper 2 Chainz and reggaeton singer Nicky Jam.

In March 2018, A. Chal signed a record deal with Epic Records.

In November of the same year, he produced the song "Bottled Up" by American singer Dinah Jane, with rapper Ty Dolla Sign and singer Marc E. Bassy.

In April 2019, A. Chal was featured in Spanish singer Rosalía's song "Me Traicionaste", which appeared on the American TV series Game of Thrones soundtrack, "For the Throne: Music Inspired by the HBO Series Game of Thrones".

=== 2020–present ===
On May 6, 2020, Alejandro released the single "Hollywood Love", featuring American rapper Gunna.

== Musical style ==
A. Chal's music generally fits into the hip hop and R&B genres. USA Today has described his music as falling somewhere "in the negative space between Hip-Hop, R&B, chillwave, and pop music." A. Chal himself has described his music's genre as soul. His sound has also been characterized as "sedated", "hazy", and "almost-psychedelic". Remezcla has called his voice "sultry, sparse, and desperate".

Lyrically, he largely discusses anecdotal experiences. Writing about his 2016 album Welcome to Gazi, Jules Muir of Pigeons & Planes noted that A. Chal attempts to cut "to the core of many of society's ills and triumphs by tapping into a deep well of personal experiences and anecdotes."

== Discography ==
=== Studio albums ===
List of albums
Title	Details
Welcome to Gazi	Release: June 3, 2016; Label: Gazi World, Empire; Format: Digital download, streaming
Far from Gaz	Release: November 12, 2021; Label: Gazi World; Format: Digital download, streaming
Espíritu	Release: February 27, 2024; Label: Gazi World; Format: Digital download, streaming

=== EPs ===
- Ballroom Riots (2013)
- Exotigaz (2018)

=== Mixtapes ===
List of mixtapes
Title	Details
On Gaz	Release: June 2, 2017; Label: Gazi World, Empire; Format: Digital download, streaming

=== Singles ===
==== As lead artist ====
Title	Year	Peak chart positions				Album
Title	Year	US R&B Airplay	US Latin Pop	US Rap Airplay	US Rhy.	Album
"Round Whippin'"	2016	—	—	—	—	Welcome to Gazi
"To the Light"	2017	—	—	—	—	On Gaz
"Matrix"	2017	—	—	—	—	On Gaz
"Love N Hennessy" (solo or featuring 2 Chainz and Nicky Jam)	2017	50	—	24	20	On Gaz
"Perdóname"	2017	—	—	—	—	On Gaz
"Cuánto" (featuring ASAP Nast)	2017	—	—	—	—	On Gaz
"000000"	2019	—	40	—	28	Exotigaz
"Hollywood Love" (featuring Gunna)	2020	—	—	—	—	Non-album single
"—" denotes a recording that did not chart or was not released in that territory.

==== As featured artist ====
Title	Year	Peak chart positions				Album
Title	Year	ARG	ECU	MEX	URU	Album
"No Promises" (Youth Is Dead featuring A. Chal)	2014	—	—	—	—	Non-album single
"Out at Night" (Stwo featuring A. Chal)	2016	—	—	—	—	D.T.S.N.T.
"Endlessly" (Tess featuring A. Chal)	2016	—	—	—	—	Tess
"Primavera" (Soso and Hansaa featuring A. Chal)	2017	—	—	—	—	Non-album single
"No Te Pegas" (C. Tangana featuring A. Chal)	2018	—	—	—	—	TBA
"100 Grados" (Lali featuring A. Chal)	2018	19	53	38	8	Brava
"Madonna" (Hamza featuring A. Chal)	2019	—	—	—	—	Paradise
"Me Traicionaste" (Rosalía featuring A. Chal)	2019	—	—	—	—	For the Throne: Music Inspired by the HBO Series Game of Thrones
"—" denotes a recording that did not chart or was not released in that territory.
