= For the Throne: Music Inspired by the HBO Series Game of Thrones =

Soundtrack album by various artists
- Released: April 26, 2019
- Length: 46:42
- Label: Columbia
- Producers: David Benioff; Ricky Reed; Aaron Dessner; DaHeala; El Guincho; Fish Narc; IIVI; Jeremiah Fraites; King Garbage; Matt Berninger; Myles Martin; Nate Mercereau; Rosalía; Sebastien Najand; The Weeknd; Tobias Wincorn; Wesley Schultz; X Ambassadors

Singles from For the Throne: Music Inspired by the HBO Series Game of Thrones
- 1. "Power Is Power" Released: April 18, 2019

For the Throne: Music Inspired by the HBO Series Game of Thrones is a soundtrack inspired by the American television series Game of Thrones, released by Columbia Records on April 26, 2019. The album features two promotional singles, "Kingdom of One" by Maren Morris and "Nightshade" by The Lumineers, which were released simultaneously on April 12, 2019, as well as the SZA, The Weeknd and Travis Scott collaborative single, "Power Is Power", which was released on April 18, 2019. Many other artists were featured on it, including X Ambassadors, Ty Dolla Sign, Chloe x Halle, Ellie Goulding, ASAP Rocky, Joey Badass, Rosalía, and James Arthur.

== Reception ==
Professional ratings
Review scores
Source	Rating
AllMusic	2.5/5 stars
Highsnobiety	2/5
Pitchfork	3.7/10

AllMusic's Stephen Thomas Erlewine rated the album 2.5 out of 5 stars.

== Track listing ==
For the Throne track listing
No.	Title	Writer(s)	Producer(s)	Length
1.	"Kingdom of One" (Maren Morris)	Sam Harris; Nate Mercereau; Eric Frederic; Wayne Hector; Morris	Ricky Reed	3:35
2.	"Power Is Power" (SZA, The Weeknd and Travis Scott)	Solána Rowe; Abel Tesfaye; Jacques Webster; Jason Quenneville; Victor Dimotsis; Zach Cooper; Ahmad Balshe; Frederic; S. Harris; Myles Martin	The Weeknd; Reed; DaHeala; Martin^{[a]}; King Garbage^{[b]}	3:31
3.	"Nightshade" (The Lumineers)	Wesley Schultz; Jeremiah Fraites	Schultz; Fraites	3:00
4.	"Hollow Crown" (Ellie Goulding)	Ramin Djawadi; S. Harris; Frederic; Cooper; Dimotsis; Goulding	Reed; King Garbage^{[a]}	2:51
5.	"Baptize Me" (X Ambassadors featuring Jacob Banks)	S. Harris; Casey Harris; Frederic; Adam Levin	Reed; X Ambassadors	3:37
6.	"Too Many Gods" (ASAP Rocky and Joey Badass)	Rakim Mayers; Mercureau; Frederic; Jo-Vaughn Scott; Hector	Mercureau; Reed	2:29
7.	"Turn on Me" (The National)	Aaron Dessner; Matt Berninger	Dessner; Berninger	4:15
8.	"From the Grave" (James Arthur)	S. Harris; Frederic; Tobias Wincorn; Hector	Reed; Wincorn^{[a]}	3:19
9.	"Me Traicionaste" (Rosalía featuring A. Chal)	Pablo Díaz-Reixa; Rosalía Vila-Tobella; Alejandro Salazar	El Guincho; Rosalía	2:46
10.	"When I Lie" (Remix) (Lil Peep featuring Ty Dolla Sign)	Gustav Åhr; Tyrone Griffin Jr.; Benjamin Friars-Funkhouser	Fish Narc; IIVI	3:13
11.	"Love Can Kill" (Lennon Stella)	S. Harris; Mercureau; Frederic; Hector	Mercureau; Reed; Cody Tarpley^{[b]}	2:30
12.	"Wolf at Your Door" (Chloe x Halle)	Chloe Bailey; Mercureau; Halle Bailey; S. Harris; Frederic; DJ Stanfill	Reed; DJ Stanfill^{[b]}	3:57
13.	"Devil in Your Eye" (Mumford & Sons)	Marcus Mumford; Winston Marshall; Benjamin Lovett; Edward Dwayne	Dessner	3:45
14.	"Pray (High Valyrian)" (Matt Bellamy)	Dan Weiss; David Benioff; Matt Bellamy	Sebastien Najand; Bellamy	3:54
Total length:				46:42

=== Notes ===
- ^{^[a]} signifies a co-producer.
- ^{^[b]} signifies a miscellaneous producer.
- "Nightshade" features background vocals by Lauren Jacobsen.
- "Turn on Me" features background vocals by Arone Dyer and Kyle Resnick.

== Charts ==
Chart (2019)	Peak position
Australian Digital Albums (ARIA)	23
Belgian Albums (Ultratop Flanders)	165
Belgian Albums (Ultratop Wallonia)	173
Canadian Albums (Billboard)	21
Dutch Albums (Album Top 100)	65
Finnish Albums (Suomen virallinen lista)	39
Swiss Albums (Schweizer Hitparade)	53
US Billboard 200	37

== See also ==
- Music of Game of Thrones
