= List of number-one albums in Argentina =

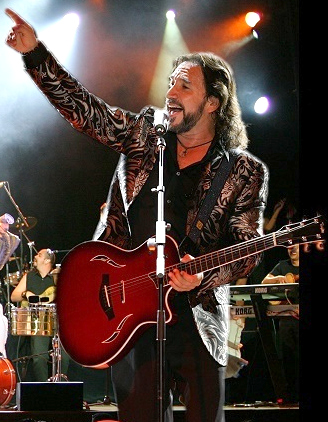
En Total Plenitud by Marco Antonio Solís (pictured) was the best-selling album of 2011 in Argentina.

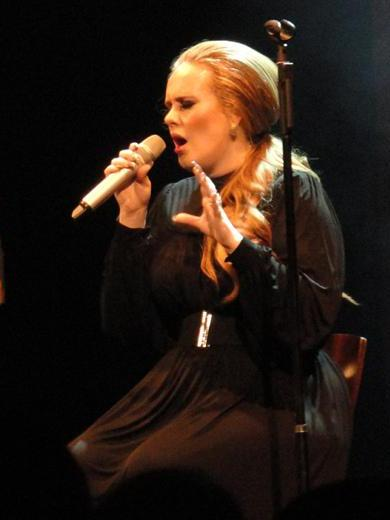
Adele's (pictured) topped the Argentinian year-end albums chart in 2012 with her second studio album 21.

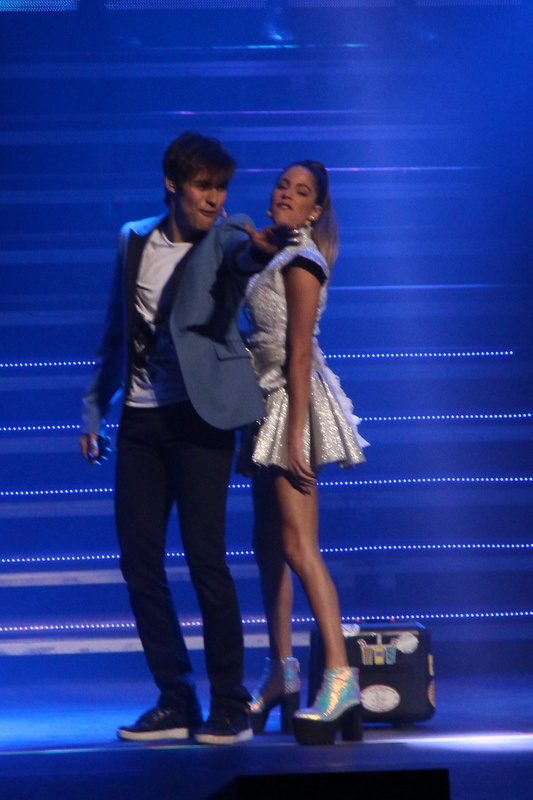
Hoy somos más from Argentinian telenovela Violetta was the best-selling album of 2013.(pictured: Martina Stoessel and Jorge Blanco)

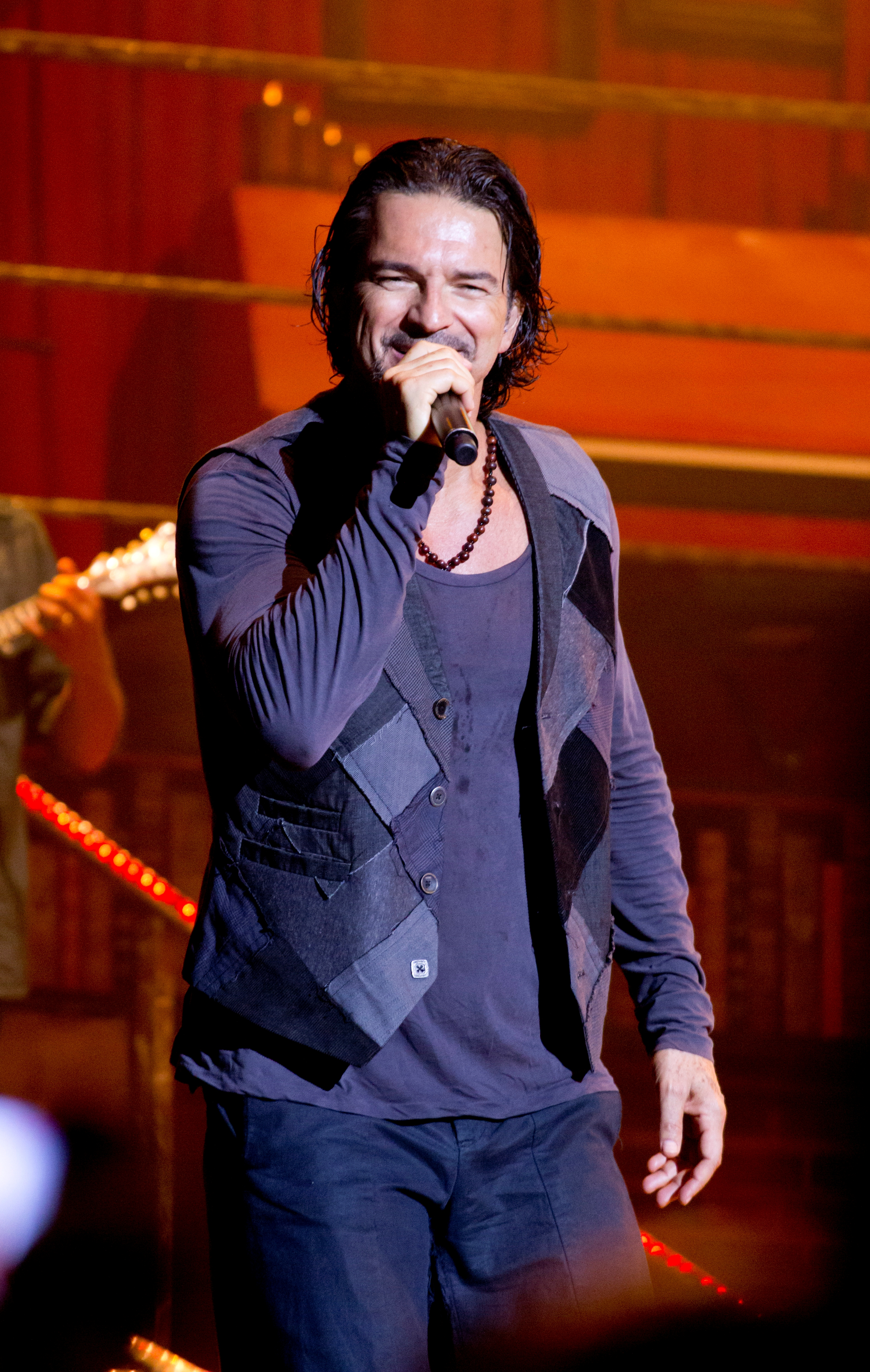
Guatemalan Ricardo Arjona's (pictured) fourteenth studio album Viaje was the best-selling album of 2014 in Argentina.

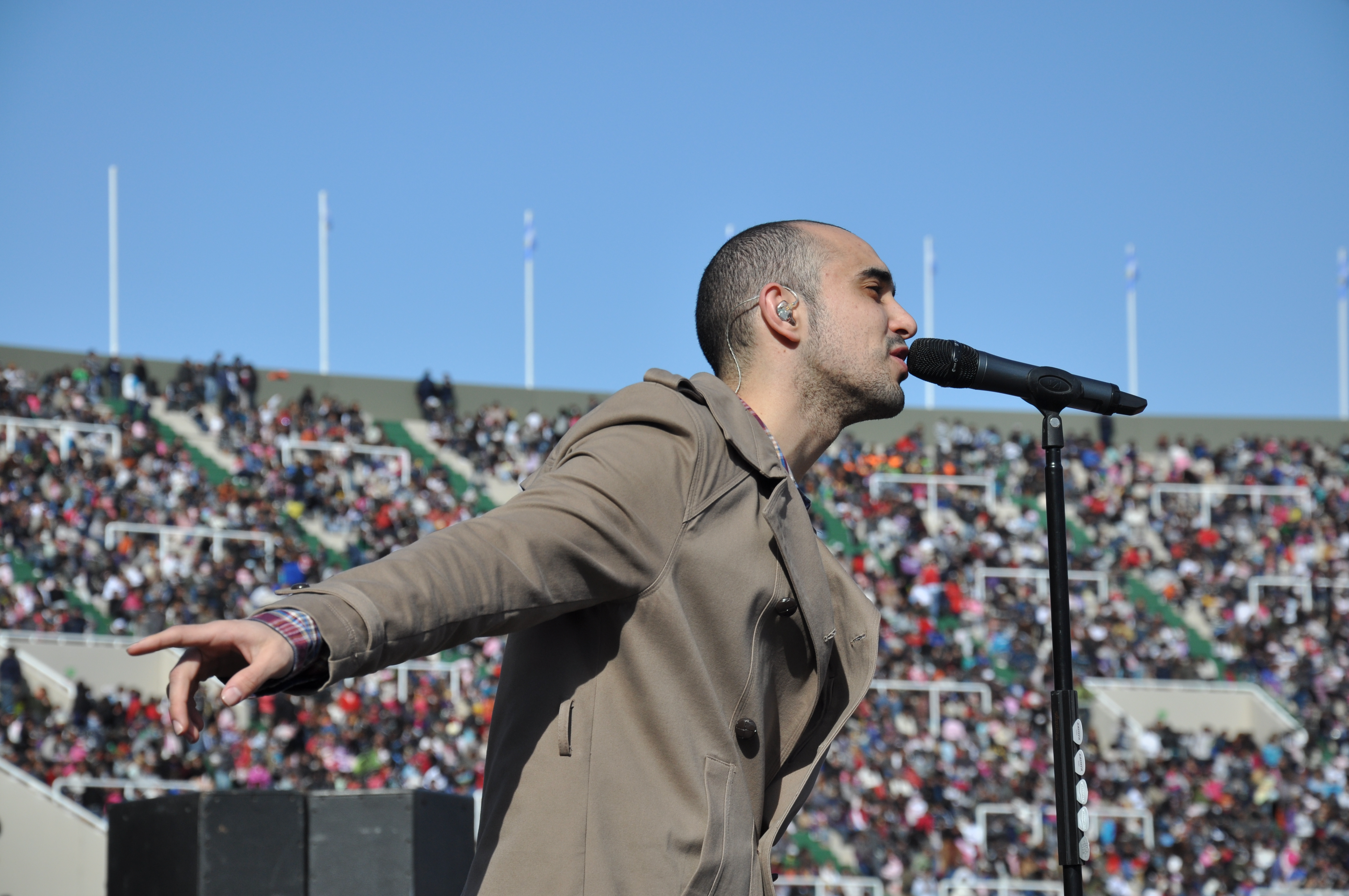
Único by Abel Pintos (pictured) was the 2015 best-selling album in Argentina.

The Argentina Top 10 is a record chart published weekly by CAPIF (Cámara Argentina de Productores de Fonogramas y Videogramas), a nonprofit organization integrated by multinational and independent record companies.

== Albums ==
Key
| † | Indicates best performing album of that year |

| Year | Month | Album | Artist(s) | Ref(s) |
|---|---|---|---|---|
| 2012 | August | Sueño Dorado | Abel Pintos | |
| 2012 | September | Vicentico 5 | Vicentico | |
| 2012 | October | El calor del pleno invierno | No Te Va Gustar | |
| 2012 | November | Take Me Home | One Direction | |
| 2012 | December | Take Me Home | One Direction | |
| 2013 | January | Believe Acoustic | Justin Bieber | |
| 2013 | February | Believe Acoustic | Justin Bieber | |
| 2013 | March | Primera Fila: Día 1 | Cristian Castro | |
| 2013 | April | To Be Loved | Michael Bublé | |
| 2013 | May | Destinología | Tan Biónica | |
| 2013 | June | Sigue y Sigue | Agapornis | |
| 2013 | July | Hoy somos más † | Violetta cast | |
| 2013 | August | Hoy somos más † | Violetta cast | |
| 2013 | September | Bohemio | Andrés Calamaro | |
| 2013 | October | ABEL | Abel Pintos | |
| 2013 | November | Midnight Memories | One Direction | |
| 2013 | December | Midnight Memories | One Direction | |
| 2014 | January | Violetta en Vivo | Violetta cast | |
| 2014 | February | Formula, Vol. 2 | Romeo Santos | |
| 2014 | March | Formula, Vol. 2 | Romeo Santos | |
| 2014 | April | Viaje † | Ricardo Arjona | |
| 2014 | May | One Love, One Rhythm – The 2014 FIFA World Cup Official Album | Various artists | |
| 2014 | June | One Love, One Rhythm – The 2014 FIFA World Cup Official Album | Various artists | |
| 2014 | July | Gira mi canción | Violetta cast | |
| 2014 | August | En Todo Estaré | Chayanne | |
| 2014 | September | Gira mi canción | Violetta cast | |
| 2014 | October | El tiempo otra vez avanza | No Te Va Gustar | |
| 2014 | November | Four | One Direction | |
| 2014 | December | Pesados Vestigios | La Renga | |
| 2015 | January | Pesados Vestigios | La Renga | |
| 2015 | February | A Quien Quiera Escuchar | Ricky Martin | |
| 2015 | March | Crecimos Juntos | Violetta cast | |
| 2015 | April | Cama Incendiada | Maná | |
| 2015 | May | Hola Mundo | Tan Biónica | |
| 2015 | June | Mis 12 Mejores Canciones | Jorge Rojas | |
| 2015 | July | Esperanza Mía | Lali Espósito | |
| 2015 | August | Tu Mano | Luciano Pereyra | |
| 2015 | September | Único † | Abel Pintos | |
| 2015 | October | Buena Vida | Diego Torres | |
| 2015 | November | Made in the A.M. | One Direction | |
| 2015 | December | Casi Justicia Social | Don Osvaldo | |
| 2016 | January | Todo Comenzó Bailando | Marama | |
| 2016 | February | Soy Luna | Soy Luna cast | |
| 2016 | March | Mind of Mine | Zayn | |
| 2016 | April | Tini | Martina Stoessel | |
| 2016 | May | Soy | Lali | |
| 2016 | June | The Getaway | Red Hot Chili Peppers | |
| 2016 | July | Apague la Luz y Escuche | Ricardo Arjona | |
| 2016 | August | Soy Luna: Musica en ti | Soy Luna cast | |
| 2016 | September | Serie de Oro, Vol. 2 | Luciano Pereyra | |
| 2016 | October | 11 | Abel Pintos | |
| 2016 | November | Lo que llevas en tu corazón | Junior Express cast | |
| 2016 | December | Blue & Lonesome | The Rolling Stones | |
