= Sin Querer Queriendo =

Single by Lali featuring Mau y Ricky

from the album Brava
- Language: Spanish
- English title: "Wanting Without Wanting"
- Released: August 23, 2018
- Genre: Latin pop; reggaeton
- Length: 3:48
- Label: Sony
- Songwriters: Mariana Espósito; Mau Montaner; Ricky Montaner; Stephen McGregor; Jon Leone; Camilo Echeverry; Pablo Akselrad; Luis Burgio; Gustavo Novello
- Producers: Di Genius; Ricky Montaner; Jon Leone

Lali singles chronology
"Besarte Mucho" (2018)	"Sin Querer Queriendo" (2018)	"Caliente" (2018)

Mau y Ricky singles chronology
"Ya No Tiene Novio" (2018)	"Sin Querer Queriendo" (2018)	"Desconocidos" (2018)

Music video
- "Sin Querer Queriendo" on YouTube

"Sin Querer Queriendo" (English: "Wanting Without Wanting") is a song by Argentine singer Lali featuring vocals from Venezuelan/Argentine duo Mau y Ricky, from her third studio album, Brava (2018). Written by Lali, Mau Montaner, Camilo Echeverry, Nano Novello, Luis Burgio, Peter Akselrad, and its producers, Ricky Montaner, Di Genius and Jon Leone, it was released by Sony Music Argentina as the album's fifth single on August 23, 2018. The song was later included in Mau y Ricky's debut album, Para Aventuras y Curiosidades (2019).

"Sin Querer Queriendo" won the award for "Song of the Year" at the 21st Annual Gardel Awards.

== Background ==
"Sin Querer Queriendo" follows Lali's previous collaboration on Mau y Ricky's remix version of "Mi Mala", which also features Becky G, Leslie Grace and Karol G. Mau y Ricky named the song as "Mi Mala"'s little sister. Lyrically in the song, Lali regrets having made out with Mau y Ricky, claiming that she was lonely, though the duo claims that it seemed intentional.

== Music video ==
Directed by Diego Berakha, the accompanying music video for the single made its premiere on Vevo on August 23, 2018, after teasing it on the first show of Lali's Brava Tour. Lali and Berakha had previously worked together in the music video for "100 Grados". In the "colorful and minimalistic" video, Lali seduces Mau y Ricky, at the same time that they have fun. All three of them are seen wearing jean clothes, and Lali performs a dynamic choreography with four dancers.

On February 15, 2020, the music video reached 100 million views on YouTube. It became Lali's first music video to reach the milestone as lead artist, and second overall.

== Live performances ==
Lali and Mau y Ricky first performed the song together at the first two shows of Lali's Brava Tour at the Luna Park Arena on August 23 and 24, 2018. On September 26, Lali performed the song on the Chilean television show Rojo, where she also performed "100 Grados". Lali and Mau y Ricky performed the song together at Univision's Countdown Feliz 2019 in Times Square, New York City, where they also performed their smash hit "Mi Mala (Remix)".

On May 12, 2019, Lali performed "Sin Querer Queriendo" as well as "100 Grados" and "Caliente" at the 6th Platino Awards.

== Personnel ==
Credits adapted from Tidal.

- Lali Espósito – vocals, songwriting
- Ricky Montaner – vocals, songwriting, producer
- Di Genius – songwriting, producer
- Jon Leone – songwriting, producer
- Mau Montaner;– songwriting
- Luis Burgio – songwriting
- Gustavo Novelo;– songwriting, recording engineer
- Peter Akselrad;– songwriting
- Camilo Echeverry;– songwriting
- Antonella Giunta;– background vocals
- Stefania Romero;– background vocals

== Charts ==
=== Weekly charts ===
Chart (2018–19)	Peak position
Argentina (Argentina Hot 100)	14
Argentina Airplay (Monitor Latino)	7
Argentina Latin Airplay (Monitor Latino)	6
Argentina National Songs (Monitor Latino)	3
Chile Pop (Monitor Latino)	17
Nicaragua Pop (Monitor Latino)	15
Paraguay Pop (Monitor Latino)	16
Uruguay (Monitor Latino)	13

=== Year-end charts ===
Chart (2018)	Position
Ecuador Pop (Monitor Latino)	87
Chart (2019)	Position
Argentina (Monitor Latino)	77
