= Cómo No =

Song by Akon featuring Becky G

Single by Akon featuring Becky G

from the album El Negreeto
- Language: Spanish
- English title: "Of Course"
- Released: September 6, 2019
- Length: 3:13
- Label: Akonik Label Group
- Songwriters: Aliaune Thiam; Mauricio Montaner; Ricky Montaner; Jon Leone; Camilo Echeverry; Carlos Peralta
- Producers: Mau y Ricky; Jon Leone; Camilo Echeverry; Maffio

Akon singles chronology
"Benjamin" (2019)	"Cómo No" (2019)	"Can't Say No" (2019)

Becky G singles chronology
"Rebota (Remix)" (2019)	"Cómo No" (2019)	"Secrets" (2019)

Music video
- "Como No" on YouTube

"Cómo No" (transl. Of course) is a song by Senegalese American singer Akon, featuring Mexican-American singer Becky G. It was released by Akonik Label Group on September 6, 2019. It is the lead single from Akon's fourth studio album and Latin debut album El Negreeto.

== Release ==
The song was released to digital platforms and streaming services on September 6, 2019.

== Music video ==
The song's accompanying music video premiered on September 6, 2019. The music video was broadcast on MTVU, MTV Live and in Time Square.

== Live performances ==
The song was performed live for the first time at the 2019 MTV Europe Music Awards.

== Personnel ==
Credits adopted from Tidal

- Camilo Echeverry – production
- John Leone – engineering, production
- Colin Leonard – engineering
- Josh Woods – engineering
- Maffio – production
- Matthew Weiss – engineering
- Mauricio Montaner – production
- Ricky Montaner – production

== Charts ==
Chart (2019)	Peak position
Mexico (Billboard Popular Airplay)	23
Latin Digital Song Sales (Billboard)	7
