= Power Is Power =

Single by SZA, The Weeknd, and Travis Scott

from the album For the Throne: Music Inspired by the HBO Series Game of Thrones
- Released: April 18, 2019
- Genre: Electro-R&B; pop rap
- Length: 3:31
- Label: Columbia
- Songwriters: Solána Rowe; Abel Tesfaye; Jacques Webster II; Eric Frederic; Jason Quenneville; Ahmad Balshe; Zach Cooper; Victor Dimotsis; Myles Martin
- Producers: The Weeknd; Ricky Reed; DaHeala

SZA singles chronology
"Garden (Say It like Dat)" (2018)	"Power Is Power" (2019)	"Just Us" (2019)

The Weeknd singles chronology
"Price on My Head" / "Wake Up" (2019)	"Power Is Power" (2019)	"Heartless" (2019)

Travis Scott singles chronology
"Chopstix" (2019)	"Power Is Power" (2019)	"The London" (2019)

Music video
- "Power Is Power" on YouTube

"Power Is Power" is a song by American singer-songwriter SZA, Canadian singer the Weeknd, and American rapper Travis Scott. It was released as the lead single from the Game of Thrones companion soundtrack, For the Throne, on April 18, 2019.

== Background and release ==
In early April of that year, rumors regarding the possibility of a Game of Thrones inspired track by SZA, the Weeknd, and Travis Scott began to circulate around the web. The artists' involvement on the For the Throne soundtrack was then later confirmed on April 8, via an announcement of the soundtrack by Columbia Records. Following the release of the promotional singles "Kingdom of One" by Maren Morris and "Nightshade" by the Lumineers on April 12, SZA then later shared the cover art and release date of the song, on her Instagram profile on April 16.

== Composition and lyrics ==
The title of the song is a line spoken by the character Cersei Lannister in the HBO TV series Game of Thrones; the song's lyrics, however, revolve around the character Jon Snow. Writers at the time interpreted the lyrics as possibly foreshadowing the aforementioned character winning out the conclusion of the show.

== Music video ==
The official music video was first teased on April 20, 2019, and features a medieval theme, reminiscent of its source show Game of Thrones. It was directed by Anthony Mandler and released on May 5, 2019.

== Charts ==
Chart (2019)	Peak position
Australia (ARIA)	30
Belgium (Ultratip Bubbling Under Flanders)	10
Belgium (Ultratip Bubbling Under Wallonia)	9
Canada Hot 100 (Billboard)	50
Canada CHR/Top 40 (Billboard)	49
China Airplay/FL (Billboard)	22
Czech Republic Singles Digital (ČNS IFPI)	33
France Digital Tracks (SNEP)	140
Hungary (Single Top 40)	40
Hungary (Stream Top 40)	16
Ireland (IRMA)	31
Latvia (LAIPA)	23
Lithuania (AGATA)	13
New Zealand Hot Singles (RMNZ)	3
Norway (VG-lista)	33
Portugal (AFP)	64
Slovakia Singles Digital (ČNS IFPI)	18
Sweden (Sverigetopplistan)	41
Switzerland (Schweizer Hitparade)	67
UK Singles (Official Charts)	45
Ukraine Airplay (TopHit)	5
US Billboard Hot 100	90
US Hot R&B/Hip-Hop Songs (Billboard)	36
US Rhythmic Airplay (Billboard)	19

== Certifications ==
Region	Certification	Certified units/sales
United States (RIAA)	Gold	500,000^{‡}
^{‡} Sales+streaming figures based on certification alone.

== Release history ==
Region	Date	Format	Label(s)	Ref.
United States	April 18, 2019	Digital download; streaming	Columbia	
United States	April 23, 2019	Contemporary hit radio	Columbia	
United States	April 23, 2019	Rhythmic contemporary	Columbia	
Italy	May 3, 2019	Contemporary hit radio	Sony	
