= Para Aventuras y Curiosidades =

Studio album by Mau y Ricky
- Released: May 3, 2019
- Recorded: 2017 – 2019
- Genre: Latin pop; reggaeton
- Length: 40:52
- Label: Sony Music Latin
- Producer: Jon Leone; Tainy; DalePlay; Richi Lopez; Sky; Ricky Montaner; Di Genius

Mau y Ricky chronology
Arte (2017)	Para Aventuras y Curiosidades (2019)

Singles from Para Aventuras y Curiosidades
- 1. "Mi Mala" Released: October 13, 2017; 2. "Mi Mala (Remix)" Released: February 9, 2018; 3. "22" Released: July 13, 2018; 4. "Ya No Tiene Novio" Released: August 10, 2018; 5. "Desconocidos" Released: October 12, 2018; 6. "La Boca" Released: May 3, 2019

Para Aventuras y Curiosidades (English: For Adventures and Curiosities) is the debut studio album by Venezuelan-American duo Mau y Ricky. It was released on May 3, 2019, through Sony Music Latin. The album is the follow-up to their debut EP Arte (2017), and features guest appearances from Sebastián Yatra, Becky G, Karol G, Lali, Manuel Turizo, Leslie Grace and Camilo.

== Background ==
The duo announced the title of the album in an interview with Forbes magazine, in which they said that "[it] represents what the all encompassing idea behind the album is." After its May 2019 release, the album debuted at number 22 on the Billboard Top Latin Albums chart, and at number 5 on the Latin Pop Albums chart, with 2,000 equivalent album units, with nearly all of that sum derived from streaming activity. The album features smash-hits "Mi Mala", "Ya No Tiene Novio", "Desconocidos" and Lali's "Sin Querer Queriendo", in which the duo appears as featured artist.

== Track listing ==
Para Aventuras y Curiosidades
No.	Title	Writer(s)	Producer(s)	Length
1.	"La Boca" (with Camilo)	Mauricio Montaner; Ricardo Montaner; Camilo Echeverry; Jon Leone; Juan Morelli; Marco Masís	Jon Leone	3:26
2.	"Mal Acompañados"	Mauricio Montaner; Ricardo Montaner; Echeverry; Leone; Masís	Tainy	3:04
3.	"Pizza"	Mauricio Montaner; Ricardo Montaner; Echeverry; Jesús Herrera; Servando Primera	DalePlay	3:07
4.	"Perdóname"	Mauricio Montaner; Ricardo Montaner; Richi Lopez	Richi Lopez	3:29
5.	"Mi Mala" (with Karol G)	Mauricio Montaner; Ricardo Montaner; Echeverry; Carolina Giraldo Navarro; Leone; Masís; Max Matluck	Tainy	3:41
6.	"Mal de la Cabeza" (with Becky G)	Mauricio Montaner; Ricardo Montaner; Echeverry; Herrera; Leone; Rebbeca Marie Gomez	DalePlay	4:02
7.	"Ya No Tiene Novio" (with Sebastián Yatra)	Mauricio Montaner; Ricardo Montaner; Echeverry; Masís; Alejandro Ramírez; Edgar Barrera; Roberto Andrade; Sebastián Obando Giraldo	Sky; Tainy	3:19
8.	"Sin Querer Queriendo" (Lali featuring Mau y Ricky)	Mauricio Montaner; Ricardo Montaner; Echeverry; Leone; Stephen McGregor; Mariana Espósito; Luis Burgio; Gustavo Novello; Peter Akselrad	Leone; Ricky Montaner; Di Genius	3:50
9.	"Japonesa"	Mauricio Montaner; Ricardo Montaner; Echeverry; Leone; Masís	Tainy	2:35
10.	"22"	Mauricio Montaner; Ricardo Montaner; Echeverry; Leone; Herrera	DalePlay	2:39
11.	"Mi Mala (Remix)" (with Karol G featuring Becky G, Leslie Grace and Lali)	Mauricio Montaner; Ricardo Montaner; Echeverry; Giraldo Navarro; Leone; Masís; Matluck	Tainy	4:15
12.	"Desconocidos" (with Manuel Turizo and Camilo)	Mauricio Montaner; Ricardo Montaner; Echeverry; Leone; Masís; Armando Lozano; Julian Turizo; Manuel Turizo	Tainy	3:25
Total length:				40:52

== Charts ==
=== Weekly charts ===
Chart (2019)	Peak position
US Top Latin Albums (Billboard)	22
US Latin Pop Albums (Billboard)	5

=== Year-end charts ===
Chart (2019)	Position
US Top Latin Albums (Billboard)	48

== Certifications ==
Region	Certification	Certified units/sales
Mexico (AMPROFON)	Gold	30,000^{‡}
United States (RIAA)	Platinum (Latin)	60,000^{‡}
^{‡} Sales+streaming figures based on certification alone.
