= The Great Mystical Circus =

1983 Brazilian musical

O Grande Circo Mistico
- Music: Chico Buarque; Edu Lobo
- Basis: O Grande Circo Mistico by Jorge de Lima
- Premiere: 1983

O Grande Circo Mistico (The Great Mystical Circus) is a Brazilian musical first performed in 1983.

Originally intended as a ballet for the Ballet Teatro Guaira, the story was inspired by the poem of Parnassianist/modernist Jorge de Lima and incorporates music, ballet, opera, circus, theater and poetry. It tells the story of a great love affair between an aristocrat and an acrobat and the saga of the Austrian family that owned the Circus Knieps, and their adventures around the world during the early 20th Century.

Early success saw a tour around Brazil and Portugal, selling over 200,000 tickets to over 200 performances.

The soundtrack is composed by Chico Buarque and Edu Lobo.

== Soundtrack track list ==
1. Abertura do circo (Opening Of The Circus) – instrumental
2. Beatriz – Milton Nascimento
3. Valsa dos clowns (Waltz of Clowns) – Jane Duboc
4. Opereta do casamento (Wedding Operetta) – Coro
5. A história de Lily Braun (The story of Lily Braun) – Gal Costa
6. Oremus – Coro
7. Meu Namorado (My Boyfriend) – Simone
8. Ciranda da bailarina – Coro Infantil
9. Sobre todas as coisas (About all things) – Gilberto Gil
10. O Tatuador (The Newbie) (instrumental)
11. A bela e a fera (The Beauty and the Beast) – Tim Maia
12. O circo místico (The Mystical Circus) – Zizi Possi
13. Na carreira (Career) – Chico Buarque & Edu Lobo
