= Caliente (Lali song) =

2018 song by Lali

Single by Lali featuring Pabllo Vittar

from the album Brava
- Language: Spanish and Portuguese
- English title: "Hot"
- Released: November 14, 2018
- Genre: Pop; Latin pop
- Length: 3:12
- Label: Sony Argentina
- Songwriters: Mariana Espósito; Rodrigo Gorky; Pablo Akselrad; Luis Burgio; Arthur Marques; Pablo Bispo; Gustavo Novello
- Producer: 3musica

Lali singles chronology
"Sin Querer Queriendo" (2018)	"Caliente" (2018)	"Lindo Pero Bruto" (2019)

Pabllo Vittar singles chronology
"Disk Me" (2018)	"Caliente" (2018)	"Seu Crime" (2019)

Music video
- "Caliente" on YouTube

"Caliente" (English: "Hot") is a song by Argentine singer Lali featuring vocals from Brazilian singer Pabllo Vittar, from her third studio album, Brava (2018). Written by Lali, Rodrigo Gorky, Pabllo Bispo, Arthur Marques, Luis Burgio, Peter Akselrad and Gustavo Novello, and produced, 3musica, it was released by Sony Music Argentina as the album's sixth single on November 14, 2018.

== Background and composition ==
In an interview with Billboard, Lali talked about the collaboration, saying that the Brazilian drag queen was the perfect fit for her single. Lali referred to the song as "genuine" and as "the perfect fusion of what Pabllo is and of what [she is]." The singer also admitted that she had to learn how to speak Portuguese, as Pabllo sings in Spanish and she sings in Portuguese. She added that "it's nice for [their] fandoms and everyone who listens to the song to understand the fusion of culture, countries, and music." Pabllo said the song is a "mix of Latin and Brazilian fun."

The song was written by Lali, Rodrigo Gorky, Pabllo Bispo, Arthur Marques, Luis Burgio, Peter Akselrad, and Gustavo Novello. Overall, "Caliente" shows everything Lali and Pabllo portray through their music: fierceness, sexiness, and girl power.

== Music video ==
Directed by Os Primos, the music video for "Caliente" made its premiere on Billboard.com on November 13, 2018, before its official premiere on Vevo. It was filmed in the beaches of Rio de Janeiro, and it shows Lali and Pabllo in colorful bathing suits. According to Jessica Roiz, the video "shows everything the two artists portray through their music: party, fun, good vibes and lots of dancing." Billboard's Stephen Daw acclaimed the video, saying that "both of the artists serve stunning beach looks and go from dancing to playing soccer to belting vocals so effortlessly that it's no wonder why this video and performance works so well."

== Critical reception ==
Jessica Roiz of Billboard called the song "the hottest collaboration of the year."

== Usage in media ==
"Caliente" became a great success after Zumba Fitness created the Caliente Challenge, which encouraged Zumba dancers to record themselves dancing to a special choreography created for the single and post it to their social networks. The challenge allowed "Caliente" to get to more than one hundred and eighty countries and fifteen million people around the world. Dancers from countries such as China, South Korea, Australia, France, Italy, the Netherlands, Russia, the United States, Brazil, and Turkey, among others, made of Caliente Challenge a viral phenomenon. After this great success, the Zumba logo can be seen on a scene from the "Caliente" music video, as well as some dancers performing the Zumba-created choreography.

== Personnel ==
Credits adapted from Tidal.

- Lali Espósito – vocals, songwriting
- Pabllo Vittar – vocals
- Luis Burgio – songwriting, producer, drums
- Gustavo Novelo – songwriting, producer, keyboard, recording engineer
- Peter Akselrad – songwriting, producer, guitar
- Ariel Chichotky – producer
- Pablo Bispo – songwriting
- Rodrigo Gorky – songwriting
- Arthur Marques – songwriting
- Stefania Romero – background vocals

== Charts ==
Chart (2018)	Peak position
Argentina (Argentina Hot 100)	51
Argentina National Songs (Monitor Latino)	12
