= Mi Mala =

2017 single by Mau y Ricky featuring Karol G

Single by Mau y Ricky and Karol G

from the album Para Aventuras y Curiosidades
- English title: "My Mean Girl"
- Released: 13 October 2017
- Recorded: 2017
- Genre: Reggaeton; Latin pop
- Length: 3:42
- Label: Sony Latin
- Songwriters: List: Ricardo Reglero; Mauricio Reglero; Carolina Navarro; Camilo Echeverry; Max Matluck; Marco Masis; Jon Leone
- Producer: Tainy

Mau y Ricky singles chronology
"Para Olvidarte" (2017)	"Mi Mala" (2017)	"Qué Tienes Tú (Remix)" (2018)

Karol G singles chronology
"Eres Mi Todo" (2017)	"Mi Mala" (2017)	"La Dama" (2018)

Music video
- "Mi Mala" on YouTube

"Mi Mala" ("My Mean Girl") is a single by Venezuelan duo Mau y Ricky and Colombian singer Karol G. The song was co-written by the three said artists, Matluck, Jon Leone, Camilo Echeverry and its producer, Tainy. A remix version featuring Becky G, Lali and Leslie Grace was released on 9 February 2018.

== Background ==
The song was written by Mau y Ricky, Karol G, Camilo Echeverry, Max Matluck, Tainy and Jon Leone. It is about two people who don't want to be in a serious relationship with each other, so they know that the other sees other people, but they don't care.

== Charts ==
Chart (2017–18)	Peak position
Spain (PROMUSICAE)	68

== Certifications ==
Region	Certification	Certified units/sales
Mexico (AMPROFON)	3× Platinum+Gold	210,000^{‡}
United States (RIAA)	3× Platinum (Latin)	180,000^{‡}
^{‡} Sales+streaming figures based on certification alone.

== Remix version ==
"Mi Mala (Remix)"

Single by Mau y Ricky and Karol G featuring Becky G, Lali and Leslie Grace

from the album Para Aventuras y Curiosidades
- Language: Spanish
- English title: "My Mean Girl"
- Released: February 9, 2018
- Recorded: January 2018
- Genre: Reggaeton; Latin pop
- Length: 4:15
- Label: Sony Latin
- Songwriters: Ricardo Reglero; Mauricio Reglero; Carolina Navarro; Camilo Echeverry; Max Matluck; Marco Masis; Jon Leone
- Producer: Tainy

Becky G singles chronology
"Díganle" (2018)	"Mi Mala (Remix)" (2018)	"Mad Love" (2018)

Lali singles chronology
"Tu Novia" (2017)	"Mi Mala (Remix)" (2018)	"100 Grados" (2018)

Leslie Grace singles chronology
"Duro y Suave" (2018)	"Mi Mala (Remix)" (2018)	"Lo Siento" (2018)

Music video
- "Mi Mala (Remix)" on YouTube

On 9 February 2018 a remix version featuring vocals by American singers Becky G and Leslie Grace, and Argentinian singer Lali was released. Its music video was shot on 18 January 2018 in Miami, Florida, and was directed by David Bohórquez. The song received a nomination for Remix of the Year at the 31st edition of the Lo Nuestro Awards.

=== Background and composition ===
For the remix, Mau y Ricky invited three more female voices. On the Spotify's exclusive behind the scenes, Ricky said "I think it's very important to support female talent, [so] it gets more powerful with the other ladies." Karol G admitted that she was "excited" about the song because it "is loyal to what [she]'s ever wanted with [her] project: give women reasons to feel inspired and great." Leslie Grace stated that "in the music industry, women are getting hold of their territory" and Lali added that "it's time for women to join". Finally, Becky G also expressed her excitement by saying: "we are this younger generation in music, and to be able to share the light is just incredible."

Becky G and Grace had previously worked together on their joint single "Díganle". The song peaked at number 13 on the Billboard Latin Digital Song Sales chart and was certified Latin platinum by the Recording Industry Association of America certification (RIAA). In 2011, Mau y Ricky ("MR" back then) had opened a show for Teen Angels, Lali's former group, at the Gran Rex Theatre in Buenos Aires.

=== Critical reception ===
Billboard described the song as a "sizzling remix of the slow reggaeton jam." Additionally, Diana Marti from E! Online said that the track "is infectious and you'll find yourself leaving it on repeat." Fuse's Jeff Benjamin added that "[the remix] is more than just a hot rework, it's a larger spotlight on the great female talent coming from the Latin music community and highlights the necessity to shed more light on it".

=== Music video ===
The official music video was shot by director David Bohórquez in Miami, Florida on 18 January 2018. It premiered on Spotify's mobile app on 9 February 2018, on the newly relaunched ¡Viva Latino! playlist. Three days after, on 12 February, it made its premiere on Vevo. Bohórquez had previously directed the music video for the original version.

In the music video, Giraldo, Gomez, Grace and Espósito all pose and smize for a camera recording them, while the guys hang out with their co-stars' faces projecting on screens. Towards the end, they all appear together in the same setting as Mau y Ricky.

=== Accolades ===
Year	Awards	Category	Result	Ref.
2018	Premios Quiero	Best Collaboration	Won	
2018	Latin Music Italian Awards	Best Latin Male Video of The Year	Nominated	
2019	Premio Lo Nuestro	Remix of the Year	Nominated	

=== Charts ===
==== Weekly charts ====
Chart (2017–18)	Peak position
Argentina (Monitor Latino)	10
Bulgaria (PROPHON)	1
Colombia (National-Report)	68
Colombia Pop (Monitor Latino)	9
Costa Rica (Monitor Latino)	12
Dominican Republic Pop (Monitor Latino)	8
Ecuador (National-Report)	15
Ecuador Pop (Monitor Latino)	7
Guatemala (Monitor Latino)	10
Panama Pop (Monitor Latino)	7
Paraguay Pop (Monitor Latino)	9
Spain (PROMUSICAE)	57
Uruguay (Monitor Latino)	8
US Hot Latin Songs (Billboard)	38
US Latin Airplay (Billboard)	33
US Latin Rhythm Airplay (Billboard)	21
US Latin Pop Songs (Billboard)	21
Venezuela (National-Report)	30
Venezuela Pop (Monitor Latino)	10

==== Year-end charts ====
Chart (2018)	Position
Argentina (Monitor Latino)	25
Argentina Latin (Monitor Latino)	24
Chile Pop (Monitor Latino)	80
Colombia Pop (Monitor Latino)	32
Costa Rica (Monitor Latino)	25
Dominican Republic Pop (Monitor Latino)	50
Ecuador (Monitor Latino)	48
Ecuador Pop (Monitor Latino)	16
Guatemala (Monitor Latino)	57
Guatemala Pop (Monitor Latino)	46
Panama Pop (Monitor Latino)	27
Uruguay (Monitor Latino)	17
Venezuela Pop (Monitor Latino)	25

=== Certifications ===
Certifications for "Mi Mala (Remix)"
Region	Certification	Certified units/sales
Spain (Promusicae)	Gold	30,000^{‡}
^{‡} Sales+streaming figures based on certification alone.

== Credits and personnel ==
Credits adapted from Tidal.

- Mauricio Montaner — vocals, songwriting, executive producer
- Ricky Montaner — vocals, songwriting, executive producer, guitar
- Karol G — vocals, songwriting
- Becky G — vocals
- Lali Espósito — vocals
- Leslie Grace — vocals
- Tainy — songwriting, production
- Max Matluck — songwriting
- Jon Leone — songwriting, vocal production
- Camilo Echeverry — songwriting
- Earcandy – mixing
- Mike Bozzi – mastering
- Alejandro M. Reglero – A&R
