= Mau y Ricky =

Venezuelan Latin pop and reggaeton duo

Mau & Ricky
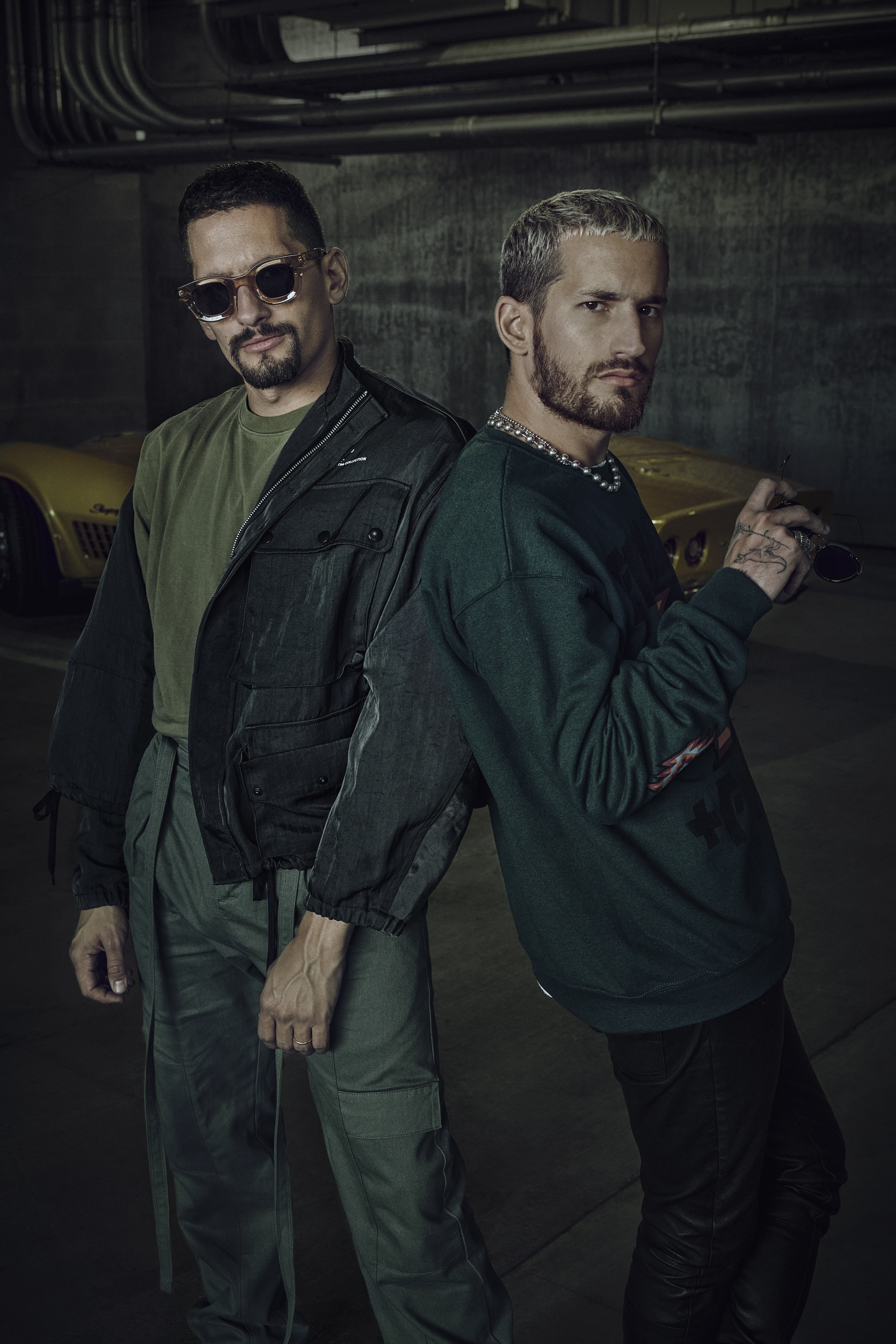
- Mau (left) & Ricky (right) in February 2020

Background information
- Also known as: MR (2011–2015)
- Origin: Caracas, Venezuela
- Genres: Latin pop; reggaeton
- Years active: 2011–present
- Labels: Warner Mexico (2011–2015); Sony Latin (2016–2023); Why Club Records (2023–present)
- Members: Mau Montaner; Ricky Montaner
- Website: mauyricky.com

Mau & Ricky is a Venezuelan Latin pop and reggaeton duo formed by singer-songwriter brothers Mauricio Alberto "Mau" Reglero Rodríguez (born August 17, 1993) and Ricardo Andrés "Ricky" Reglero Rodríguez (born November 21, 1990), both sons of Argentine-Venezuelan singer Ricardo Montaner.

Songs such as the "Mi Mala" remix featuring Karol G, Becky G, Leslie Grace and Lali (which peaked at No. 44 on the Hot Latin Songs chart), have catapulted onto the Latin Urban Pop charts.

The duo has released an EP, Arte, on Sony Music Latin, and an album Para Aventuras y Curiosidades, which peaked at No. 3 on Billboard's Latin Pop.

They were nominated for the 2017 Latin Grammy Award for Best New Artist and Song of the Year and chosen by YouTube Music as the only Latin Artist to be part of "Artist on the Rise" in 2019.

== Early life ==
Mauricio Alberto and Ricardo Andrés Reglero Rodríguez were born in Caracas, Venezuela, to the filmmaker Marlene Rodríguez, and Ricardo Montaner, an Argentine-born Venezuelan singer-songwriter. They were raised until the ages of 7 and 10 in Caracas before moving to Miami, Florida. They have a sister Evaluna and two older half-brothers, Alejandro Manuel and Héctor Eduardo, from their father's first marriage. Mau y Ricky are bilingual, speaking both English and Spanish. They also volunteered in their parents' foundation La Ventana de Los Cielos.

== Music career ==
They began studying music at the ages of 4 and 6 years respectively and started their music career playing weekly at a church in a band that they co-founded. In 2011 they began performing as MR until 2015, when they changed the name of the duo to Mau & Ricky.

=== Arte and Para Aventuras y Curiosidades ===
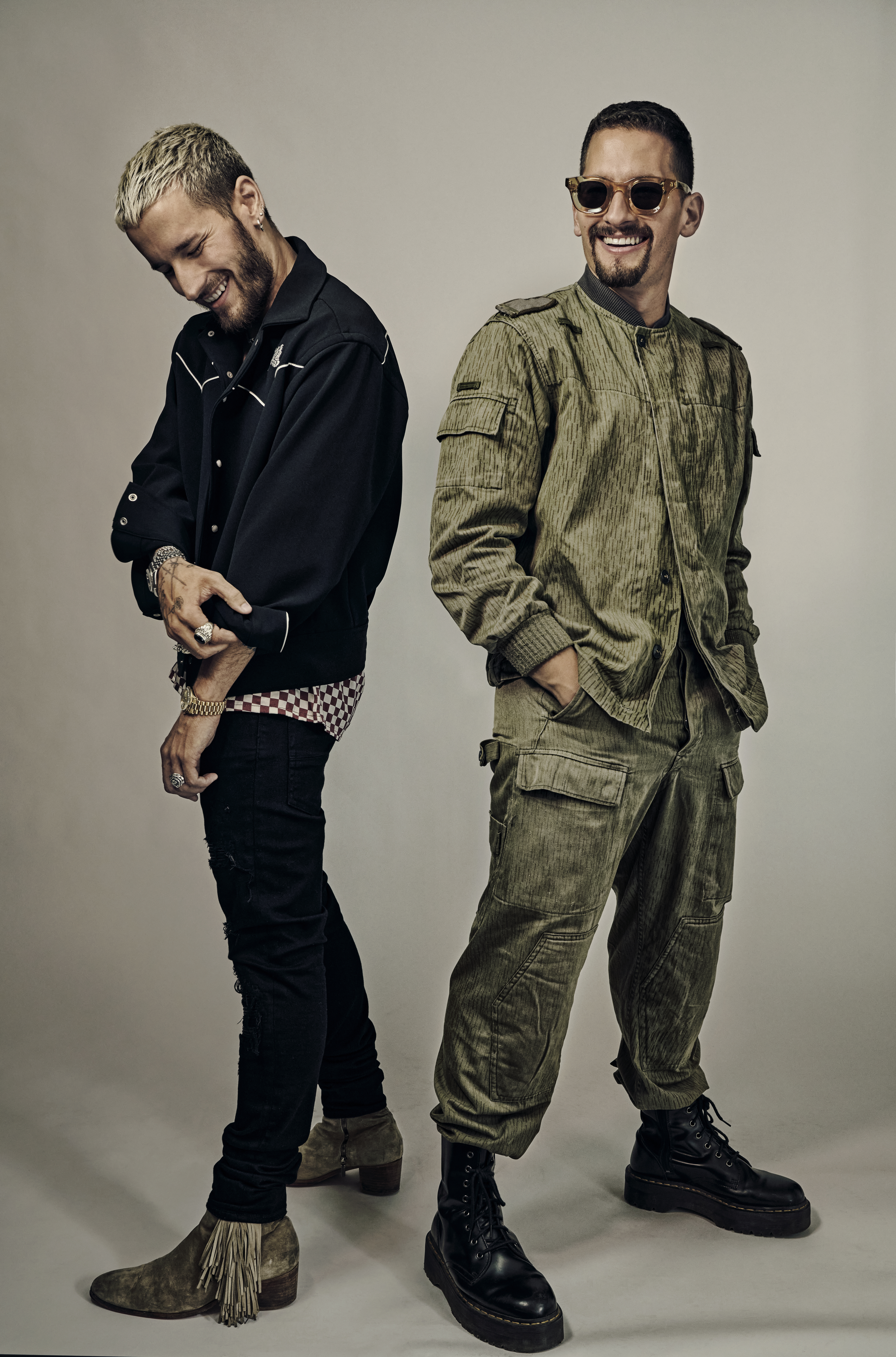
Mau & Ricky during a photo session

In 2017, they released Arte, their first EP under the umbrella of Sony Music Latin.

In May 2019, they released their album Para Aventuras y Curiosidades which has peaked at No. 3 on Billboard's Latin Pop charts and stayed on the Billboard charts for 39 weeks straight. The album has received multiple diamond and platinum records in the US and has been in numerous other Billboard Charts. The album got a finalist position for the 2020 Billboard Latin Music Awards in Latin Pop Album of the Year category.

=== Collaborations and Rifresh ===
In October 2019 they released their song "Bota Fuego" with hit reggaeton artist Nicky Jam

In January 2020, Mau y Ricky were featured in 3 singles (Thalía "Ya Tú Me Conoces", Tini "Recuerdo" and Ovy on the Drums "Sigo Buscándote"). Within 2 months they dropped "Qué Dirías?" and "Me Enamora." After a few other collabs they officially kicked off their second era with the release of "PAPÁS" in August 2020. With only two other singles released their album "rifresh" was released in November 2020

=== Desgenerados Mixtape and Hotel Caracas ===
Mau y Ricky kicked off their third era in 2021 with the release of "3 de la Mañana" with Sebastián Yatra and Mora. With the release of several hit singles in 2021, 2022, and 2023. In November 2023 they announced the release of their "Desgenerados Mixtape" with some songs that were previously released and some new songs. A few months after that they released the lead single for what they call their most ambitious project to date, "Hotel Caracas" with a slated release of 2024 they are expected to not only release an album they are expected to have a headlining tour and release a film/documentary about the creation of the album

=== Songwriter collaborations ===
As composers, they have written songs for several singers including Chayanne, Thalía, Leslie Grace, Miguel Bosé, Diego Boneta, Cristian Castro, Ricky Martin, Karol G and Ednita Nazario.

Some of their music compositions include diamond selling tracks among which are "Ya No Tiene Novio" (Sebastián Yatra, Mau y Ricky), "Sin Pijama" (Becky G, Natti Natasha), Vente Pa´Ca (Ricky Martin, Maluma) and "Pa’Dentro" (Juanes).

== Discography ==
- Para Aventuras y Curiosidades (2019)
- rifresh (2020)
- Hotel Caracas (2024)
- Ricky y Mau (2026)

== Filmography ==
Year	Title	Role	Notes
2019	La Voz México	Musical guests	Performed in the Finale
2020	La Voz US	Comeback Stage Coaches	
2021-2022	La Voz Kids	Coaches	Winning coaches in 2022
2021-2022	La Voz Argentina	Coaches	

== Awards ==
At the 18th Annual Latin Grammy Awards in 2017, Mau y Ricky were nominated for the Latin Grammy Award for Best New Artist for their album Arte and the Latin Grammy Award for Song of the Year for "Vente Pa' Ca". They won the Gardel Award for Song of the Year for their song "Sin Querer Queriendo", alongside Lali.

In 2019, they were chosen by YouTube Music as the only Latin artist to be part of "Artist on the Rise".

== Concert tours ==
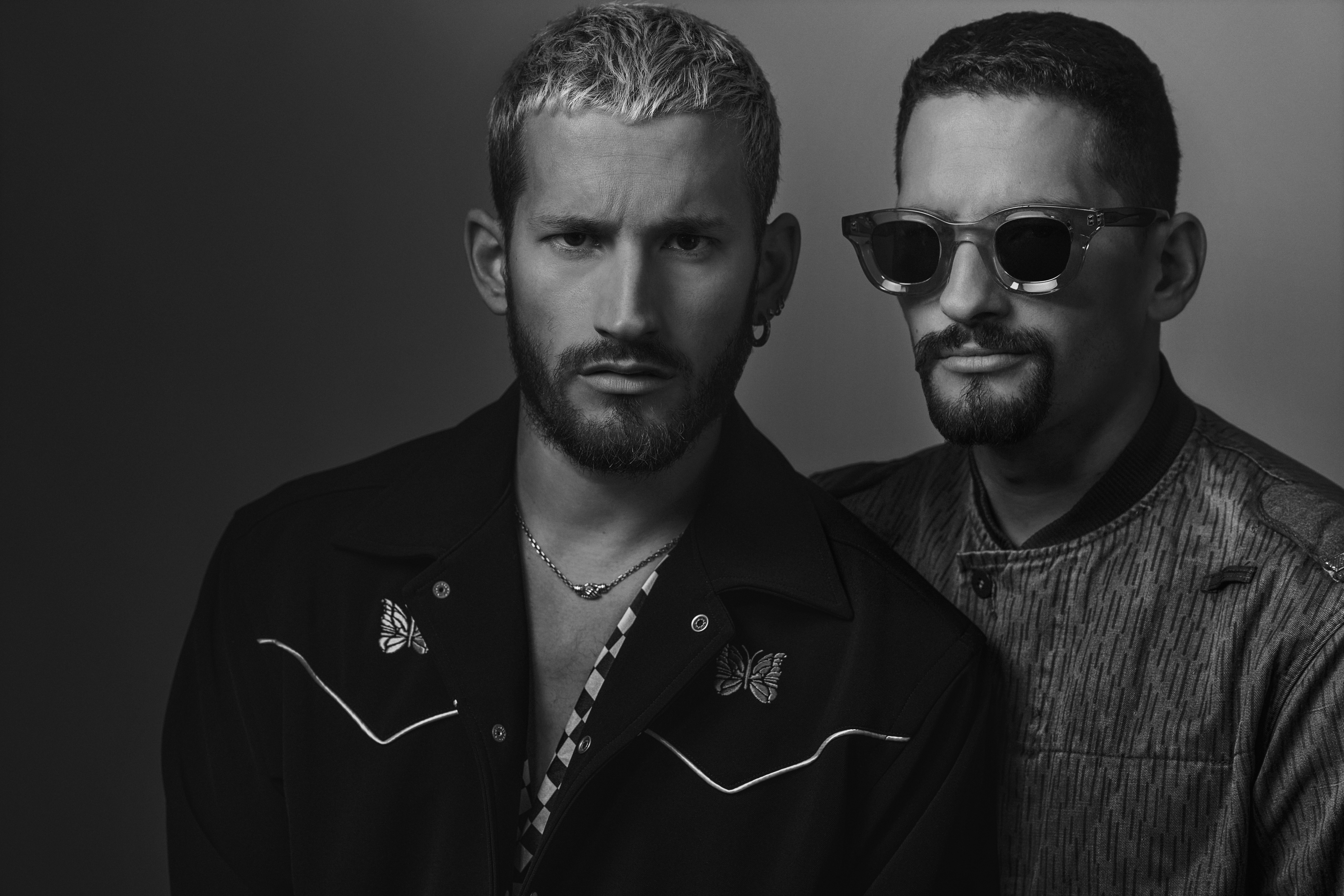
Mau & Ricky during a photo session

Headlining

- Dos Desconocidos Tour (2019)
- Argentina Tour '21 (2021)

Opening act

- Teen Angels – Teen Angels Tour (2011)
- Camila Cabello – Never Be the Same Tour (2018)
- Marc Anthony – Legacy Tour
