= José María Cano =

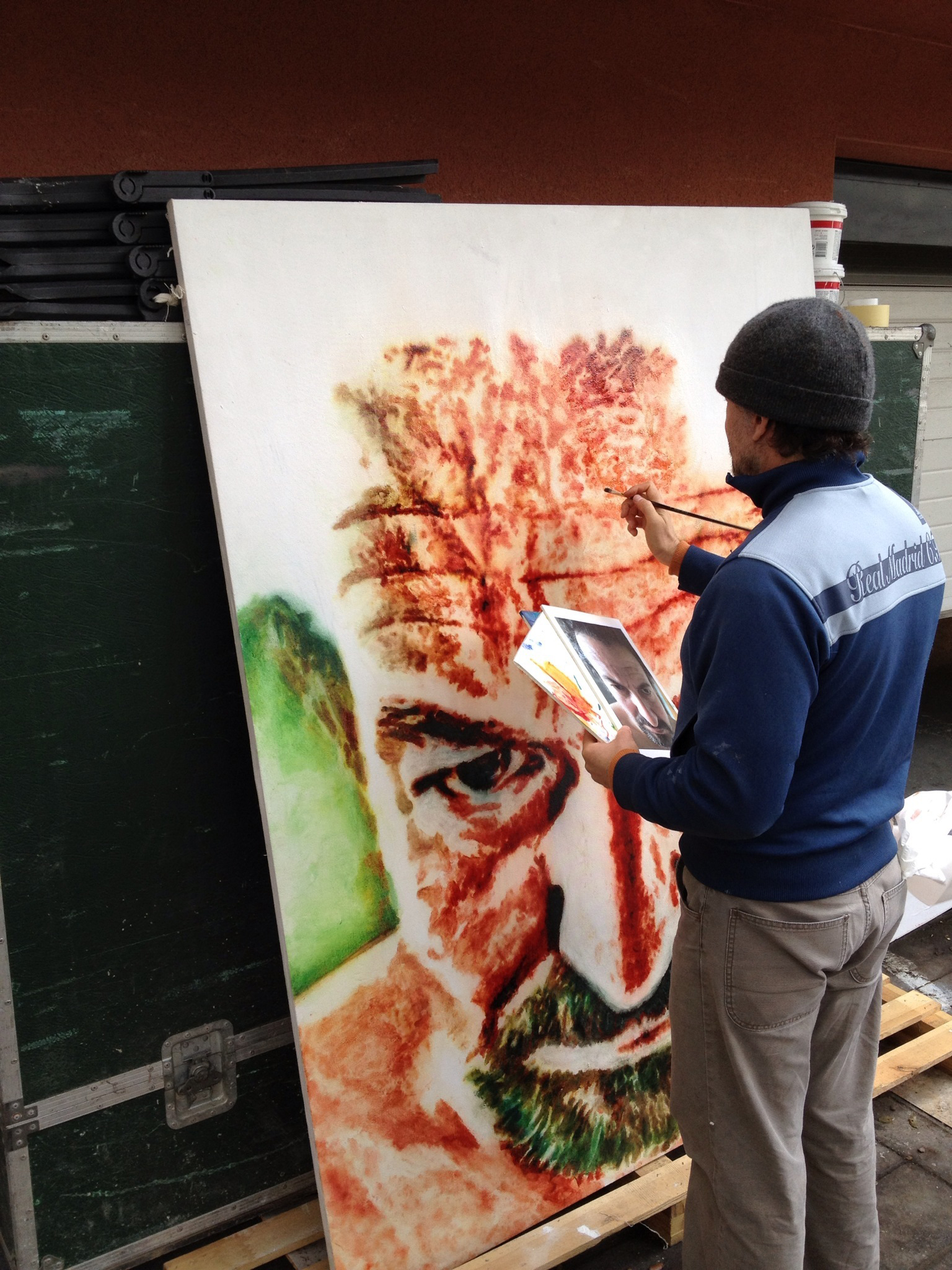
- Cano Painting "Blood Test"

Background information
- Born: José María Cano Andrés; 21 February 1959 (age 67); Madrid, Spain
- Occupations: Composer; visual artist
- Years active: 1977–present
- Labels: Sony BMG (Columbia Records and BMG Ariola/Eurodisc); Santa Teresa Records; Muxxic
- Formerly of: Mecano

José María Cano Andrés (born 21 February 1959) is a Spanish visual artist, musician, composer, and record producer. From 1982 to 1998, he was a member and principal composer of the Spanish pop-rock band Mecano. Since 1998, he works primarily in the visual arts.

== Musician ==
José María Cano was born in Madrid, and gave his first concerts as a university student there. There he met Ana Torroja, who would become the lead singer in their pop band Mecano. Their first album, also called Mecano (1981) and produced with the financial backing of his father, included the hit "Hoy No Me Puedo Levantar". Both José and his brother Nacho composed songs for all their albums.

In 1984, José began to play piano and changed his method of composition. He began to compose for other singers, such as La Mafia, Chayanne, Ana Belén, Amaya Uranga, Sara Montiel, Julio Iglesias, Miguel Bosé, Alaska, Françoise Hardy, Sarah Brightman, Simone, Mario Frangoulis etc. He composed songs that would become well known in the Spanish-speaking world, such as Hijo de la Luna, Lia, Mujer contra mujer, Me cuesta tanto olvidarte, Aire, Tiempo de vals, Cruz de navajas, Naturaleza muerta, Una rosa es una rosa and several others, which were covered both by Spanish and non-Spanish-speaking singers.

After Mecano separated in 1992, he composed an opera, Luna (opera), which was recorded with Plácido Domingo in the leading role. In 2002 he composed the anthem for Real Madrid also sung by Plácido Domingo. In 2006, he composed an "Our Father" that was sung by Montserrat Caballé during the visit of Pope Benedict XVI to Valencia. Six years later, he conducted the orchestra at Caballé's last concert in Madrid.

== Artist ==
José María Cano began drawing at a very young age. From the age of 10, he attended the Rafael Hidalgo de Caviedes academy, followed by the Artaquio academy, in order to learn how to draw and paint in preparation for an architectural career. During his first-year architecture studies he learned to master encaustic with his shape analysis professor, who was a painter. He began to work professionally in 2002, although his first exhibition came in 2004 in Craig Robins’ Private Space, commissioned by Ambra Medda. Mexican gallery owner Ramis Barquet saw this exhibition and commissioned his first commercial exhibition.

That exhibit, entitled, "This Is Just Business", appropriated its imagery from the letters of his divorce and mixed with drawings of his son. He painted the most aggressive letters from his wife's lawyers on backgrounds, which resemble desert or icy landscapes, that, when combined with drawings of his son, attempted to re-contextualize the lawyer's letters, the purpose of which were to damage Cano's reputation in the midst of a contentious divorce. This work, painted meticulously by him and hung on the wall took, attempted to undermine the power of those letters. In other words, a letter on his desk which might make you think he was a despicable person, when painted and hung on his dining room wall might made you consider whether the person who wrote it who was despicable, rather Cano himself. Because his divorce took place at the same time as the Iraq war while he painted the letters of his divorce he also painted pictures about the war. He saw a rhythmic parallelism between the two events which coincided in time, namely a confrontation with economic undertones against a so-called enemy and where innocent people suffered the consequences, especially children. His paintings with drawings of his son are also from this era. Monochromatic drawings on a sheet of paper. Simple but conceptually very interesting. Around the same time Cano started on a series of work where he projected drawings done by his son Daniel, who has Asperger's syndrome. Cano copied them meticulously on a large scale, viewing these works as an exercise in humility, where the father understood that he had to copy the son as opposed to the son copying the father. Later he began to paint newspaper headlines and articles, continuing to explore his perspective that the truth is only true until someone tells it. He has pictures, for example, with titles such as "Immigration Brings More Crime", where the expression of what is most likely a verifiable fact hides a xenophobic attitude of some of the heads of the English press.

=== Work influenced by finance ===
His first exhibition on the world of finance, "The Wall Street 100"', took place in early 2006. Based on newspaper clippings taken directly from the Wall Street Journal, Cano painstakingly reproduced the small hedcuts portraits and surrounding column text in each clipping in large scale using colored waxes (encaustic painting). Reproducing these generic looking mass-produced portraits in wax was Cano's attempt to create authentic monuments with a three-dimensional effect and ironically express his opinion that these people were the new Venus-Aphrodites, and therefore he as a painter was obliged to affirm this beauty. As Hugo Rifkind wrote in an article in The Times newspaper art pages, "Cano's pictures surface has a translucent depth so that they are more like sculptures than paintings".

At the same time as painting characters from the financial world, he also painted statistics of the performance of the financial markets and the stocks of specific companies. He called this series of statistics "Mountains", considering them to be the new landscapes a painter should paint. Painting characters from the financial world and statistics instead of Venus-Aphrodites and landscapes allowed him to reconcile himself with traditional painting, which he does not renounce in spite of the conceptual nature of his work. In fact his series of bullfight etchings called "La Tauromaquia" had been shown at the Fine Art Museum of Hanoi and at the Picasso Foundation in Málaga with the Goya and Picasso series of the same name, in the show "La Tauromaquia".

=== Conceptual work ===
In spite of his technical preparation, Cano's work up to the present day has basically been conceptual. He works academically with a variety of labour-intensive art technics such as encaustic on canvas for his paintings, watercolor on paper for his drawings, or aquatint on copper plate for his etchings. Writing about him in the Architectural Digest, Cristina Giménez says: "At a time when almost no artists draw, he converts this discipline into the central tenet of his work: black lines on a white background: With ink on paper or encaustic on canvas (an ancient technique using wax as a pigment binder) his production is impeccable and the effects are spectacular." Based on images which are originally newspaper cut-outs or photographs, he uses the contemporary techniques of appropriation as an aim to navigate the space between reality and truth. His favorite saying is by the painter Torres García, who said, "Reality has three dimensions, whilst truth has only two." The majority of his works are in black and white, and he extends Torres García's phrase in the sense that reality is multi-coloured, whilst we tend to represent the truth in black and white. For him it is a scale of greys. He does not see black and white as a bi-chromatic reality, but as intervention and non-intervention. He converts the white background of his works on wax into an ether, a void on which he intervenes or does not intervene, in such a way that the three-dimensional or multi-coloured reality becomes his work, not just in the two-dimensional reality, but in a one-dimensional reality consisting of intervention or non-intervention. His encaustic technique is in an alchemistic and time-consuming process. As said by art critic Anthony Haden-Guest in his Financial Times column, Cano recreates the images meticulously applying seven layers of wax, in a process that may take up to a thousand hours per work.

As Marco Livingstone says in his essay for Cano's catalogue at Riflemaker in London:"Cano’s paintings take shape through an alchemical process of their own, the fluidity of their marks burnt into the surface by light in a process as apparently random and subject to physical forces, and as mysterious and inexplicable, as the formation of the universe itself." Jose Maria Cano's art was shown at Cafa Art Museum in Beijing in a retrospective exhibition curated by Wang Huangsheng and occupying two floors of the museum.

In 2018 Jose-Maria Cano was among the contemporary artists who had cracked the Asian market for the first time in 2017 with a portrait of one of China’s richest men, Jack Ma. The painting quadrupled his former existing record price at $414,000. Auction house Sotheby’s was hoping that that might do the same in 2018 with his portrait of Steve Jobs.

== Art exhibitions ==
2004

- 50 Shark Teeth, curated by Ambra Medda, Craig Robins' Private Space, Design District at Miami Art Basel, Miami.

2005

- Todos Somos Diferentes, Galería Ramis Barquet, Monterrey, Mexico.

2006

- Mural of the suffragist Clara Campoamor, for Spanish senate, Madrid.
- Materialismo Matérico. Project B Gallery, Milan.
- José-María Cano: Paintings. Curated by Huang Azhong, Urban Museum, Shanghai.
- Jason Rhoades Memorial. Museum of Contemporary Art (MOCA), Los Angeles.
- WS 100. Curated by Carlota Alvarez Basso, Palacio de Sobrellano, Comillas, Spain.
- Arte Urbano. Curated by Fernando Francés, Fundación Coca-Cola, Arco 06, Madrid.
- Masturbation, Allsopp Contemporary, London.

2007

- Materialismo-Matérico. Curated by Julieta Manzano, CAC Málaga, Centro de Arte Contemporáneo de Málaga, Málaga.
- Avatar of Sacred Discontent, group exhibition. Curated by Wolfe Lenkiewicz & Flora Fairbairn, 9 Hillgate, London.
- Captain Thunder, Allsopp Contemporary, London.

2008

- Welcome to Capitalism, DOX Centre for Contemporary Art, opening exhibition. Prague.
- Mural for the Moscow World Fine Art Fair, curated by Teresa Mavica, Moscow.
- Art Is a Waste of Time, Artists Anonymous Gallery, Berlin.
- London Calling, Kristy Stubbs Gallery, Group exhibition of London-based artists, curated by Elaine Ferguson, Dallas.
- Heroes of Our Time, Regina Gallery, Moscow.

2009

- "Madonna meets Mao", Staatliche Kunstsammlungen Dresden, Dresden, Germany.
- La tauromaquia, Riflemaker, curated by Tot Taylor, London.
- "God Sell the Queen", Sotheby's, London.
- The Wall Street One Hundred, The Dairy, curated by Virginia Damtsa, London.

2010

- Cartel de las Ferias de San Isidro, Feria del Aniversario and Feria de Otoño for the plaza de toros de Las Ventas de Madrid.
- La tauromaquia. Goya siglo XIX, Picasso siglo XX, Cano siglo XXI., Grabados de toros. Madrid
- Vietnam's Museum of Fine Arts (Baotang Mythuat), Hanoi.
- Tauromaquias, Fundación Picasso, curated by Lourdes Moreno, Málaga.
- Viewing City—Shanghai Intl. Printmaking Exhibition 2010. Organizing: Guiding unit: China Artists Association Printmaking Art Committee, Shanghai Hongqiao Contemporary Art Museum, Shanghai

2011

- Charles Riva Collection, Brussels.
- The Murdoch Principle, Caprice Horn Gallerie, Berlin.
- Orientale, 54th Venice Biennale, Curated by Maurizio Bortolotti and Shwetal Ashvin Patel, Venice.
- Les Fleurs du Mal, Munichmodern/11, programmatic exhibition platform for contemporary art Curators: Dr. Isabella Goebel and Dr. Alexandra von Stosch., Munich.

2012

- Divorce Papers and Expensive Postcards, Kristy Stubbs Gallery, Dallas, Texas, USA.
- Principles of Composition, Munichmodern/12. Dr Isabella Goebel. Munich.

2013

- Arrivederci capitalismo!, PAN (Pallazo delle Arti Napoli). Curated by Maurizio Bortolotti. Naples.
- Economics in Art, MOCAK (Museum of Contemporary Art of Kraków), Kraków
- Dark Side of the Moon, Lin & Lin Gallery, Chia Chi Jason Wang Taipei. Live from Taipei We were lucky enough to take a... - artnet
- Jose-Maria Cano. Paintings. Tianjín Exhibition Centre", Curated by Kang Hui Li. Tianjin.
- WS100 in China, Zhongshan art museum. Curated by Chen Enping. Dalian.

2014

- Guess What? Hardcore Contemporary Art's Truly a World Treasure, Momat: The National Museum of Modern Arts, Tokyo. Curated by Reiko Nakamura Tokyo.
- La cera que aun arde, Plaza de toros "Las Ventas", Madrid. Madrid.
- De Providentia, Arsenale Museum. Curated by Alexander Soloviov Kyiv.

2015

- Jose Maria Cano, Karuizawa New Art Museum, Whitestone Foundation Gallery. Curated by Haruna Yui Nagano Prefecture.
- Popular Culture and Contemporary Art, 21c Museum Hotel. Cincinnati.
- Luna, Riflemaker Contemporary Art, The Riflemaker Gallery. Curated by Marco Livingstone London.

2016

- The Soul of Money, DOX Centre for Contemporary Art. Curated by Leoš Válka Prague.
- Jose-Maria Cano at CAFA Art Museum, CAFA Art Museum. Curated by Wang Huangsheng Beijing.
- Una est, Lin & Lin Gallery, curated by Davi Lin. Taipei, Taiwan

2018

- Game Changers. S2 by Sotheby´s Hong Kong, Convention Center. Curated by Pati Wong. Hong Kong

2019

- Apostolate, San Diego Museum of Art. Curated by Michael Brown. San Diego, California
- Pedes in terra ad sidera visus. Museu Nacional de Arte Antiga. Curated by Rosa Martinez. Lisbon

2020

- Apostolados. José Maria Cano and El Greco. Catedral Primada de Toledo. Curated by Rosa Martínez. Toledo, Spain

2022

- The unseeable light. Mongolian National Modern Art Gallery. Curated by Maurizio Bortolotti. Ulaanbaatar, Mongolia

2023

- Moonshine. A. Kasteyev State Museum of Arts. Almaty, Kazakhstan
- Differences and similarities between truth and reality. National Museum of the Republic of Kazakhstan. Astana. Kazakhstan

== Gallery ==
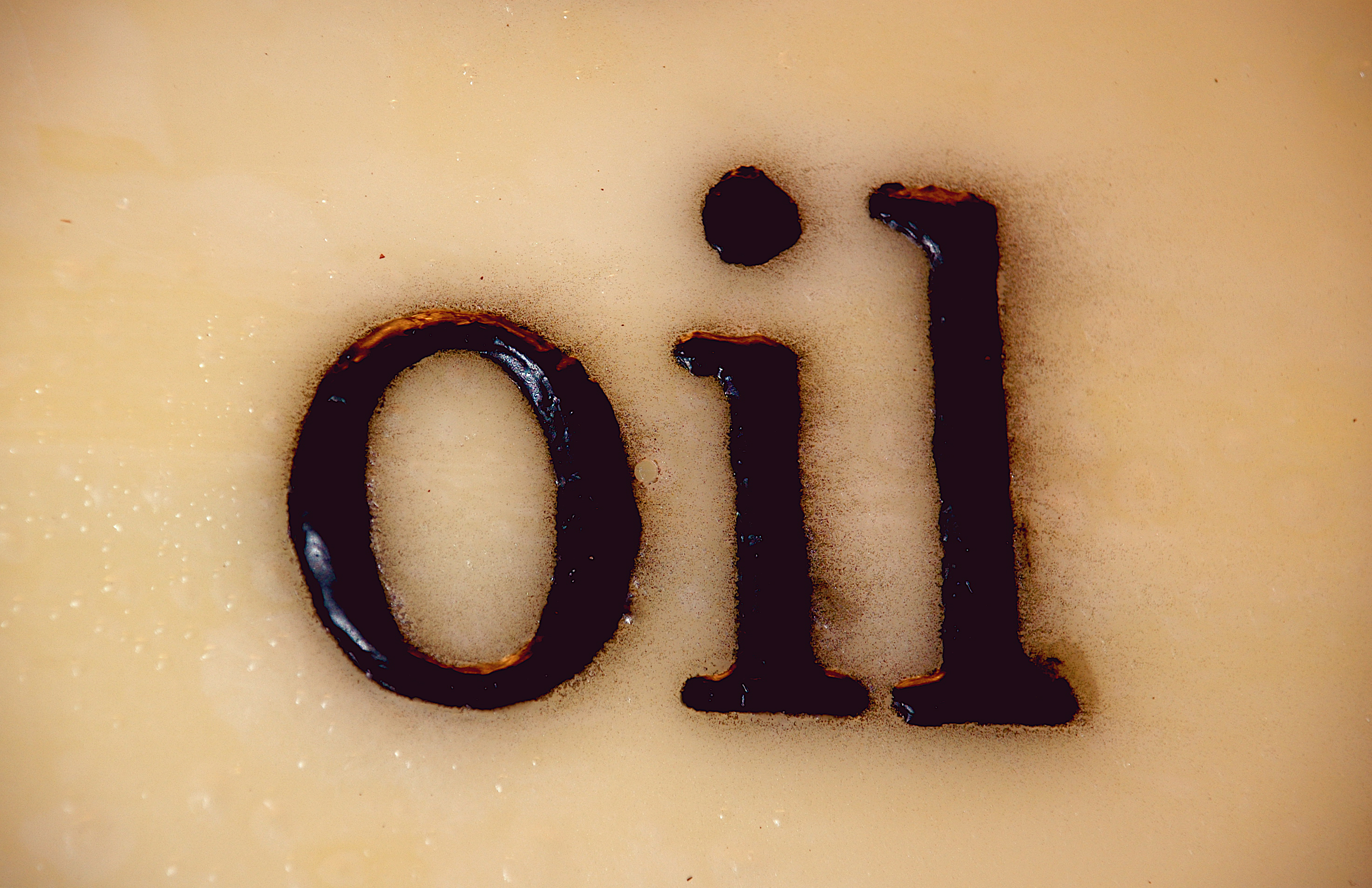

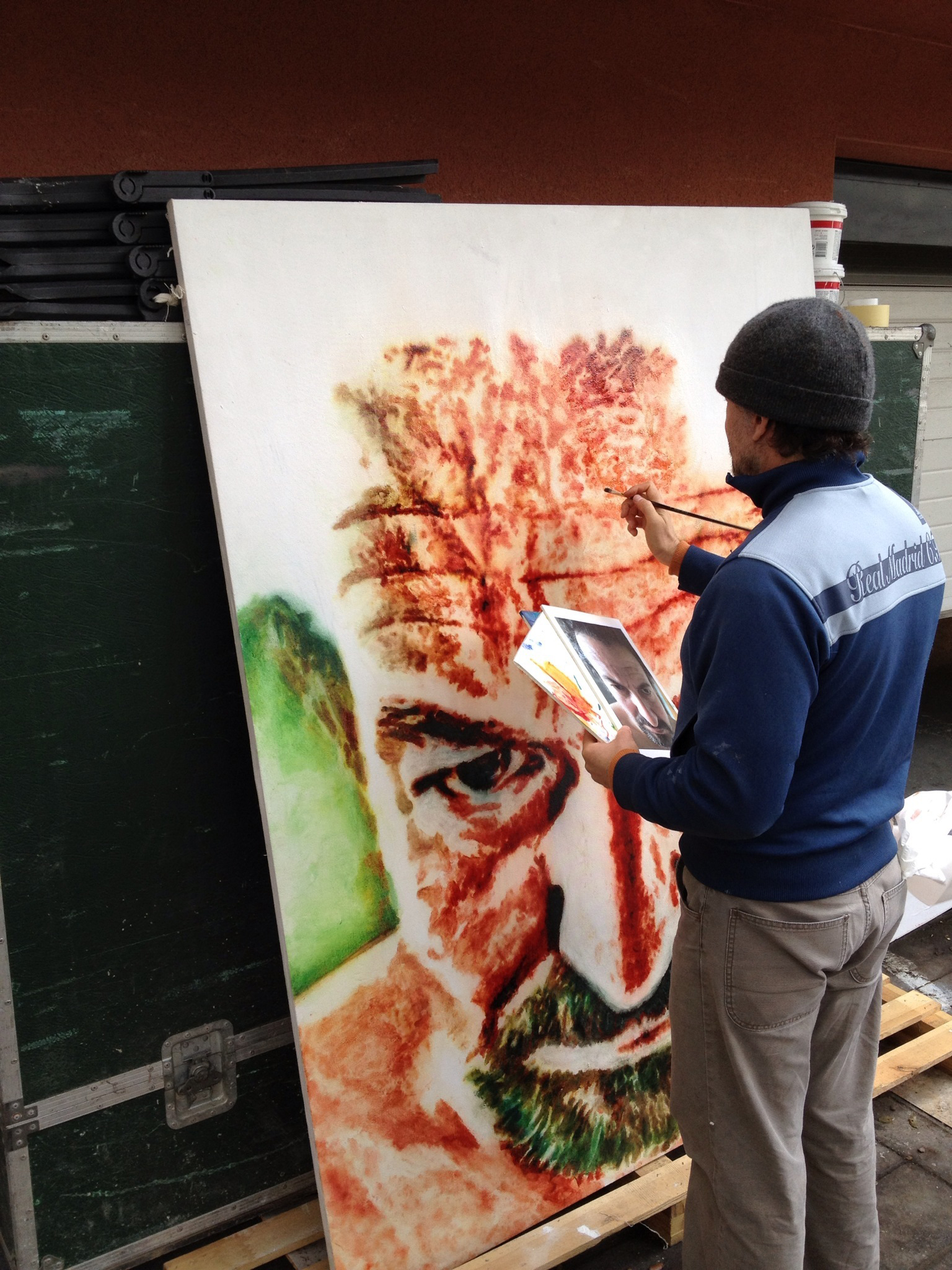

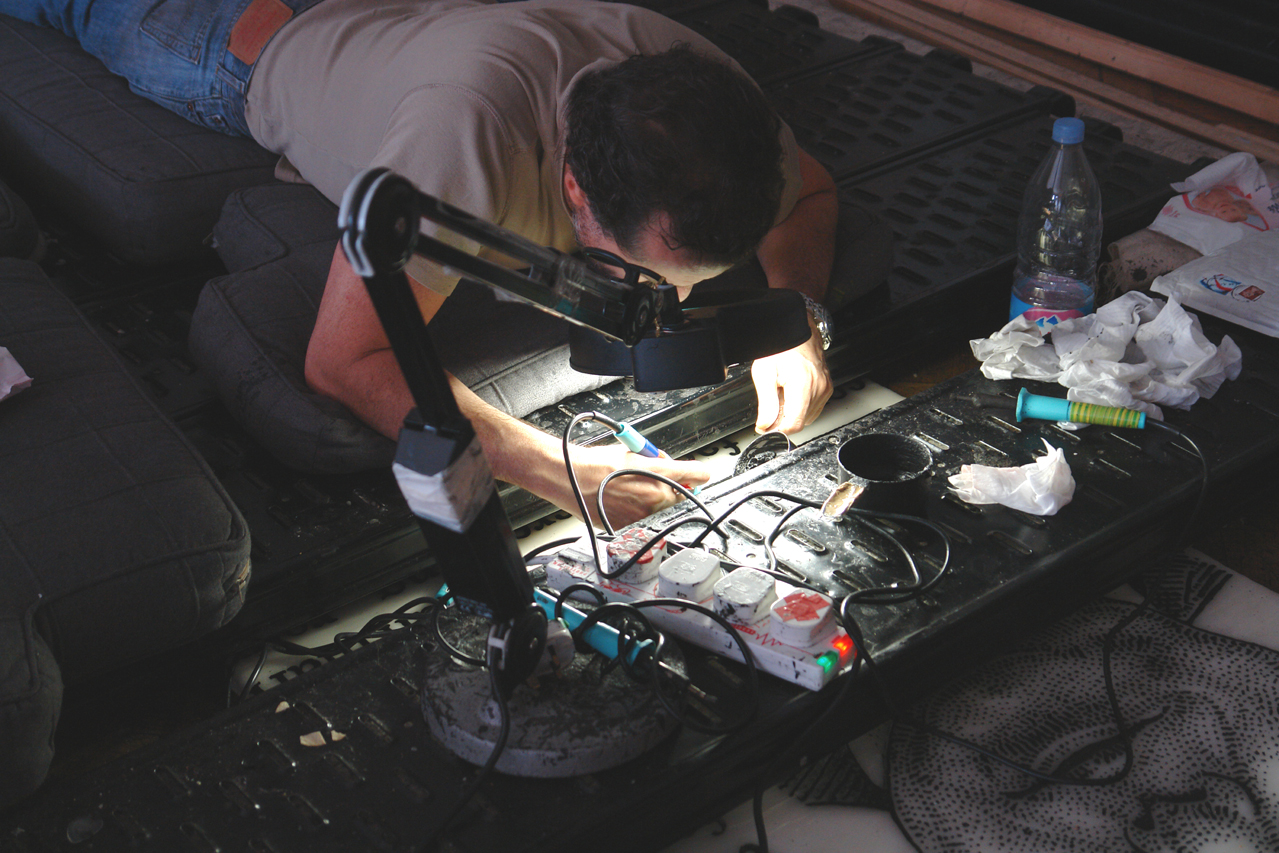

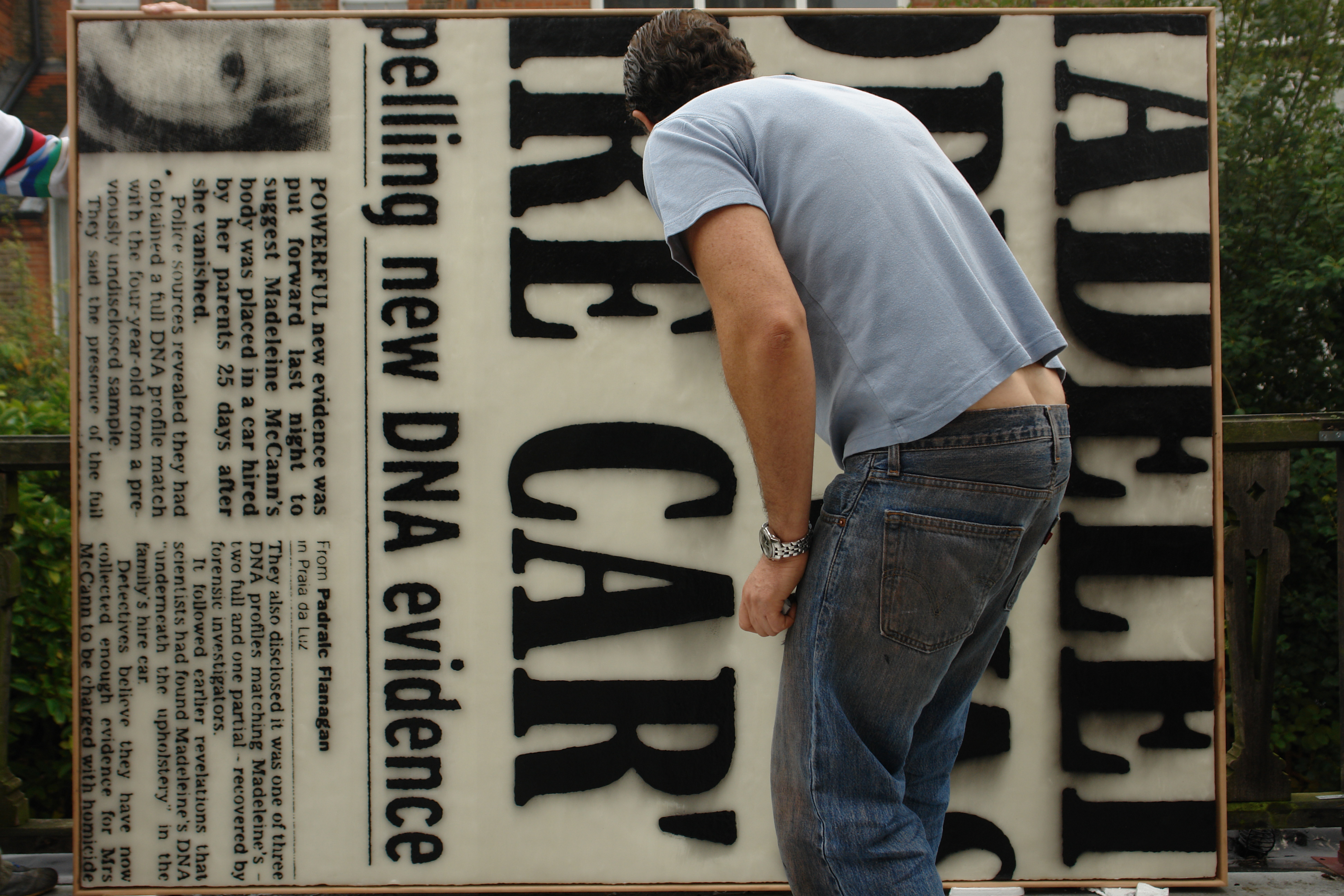

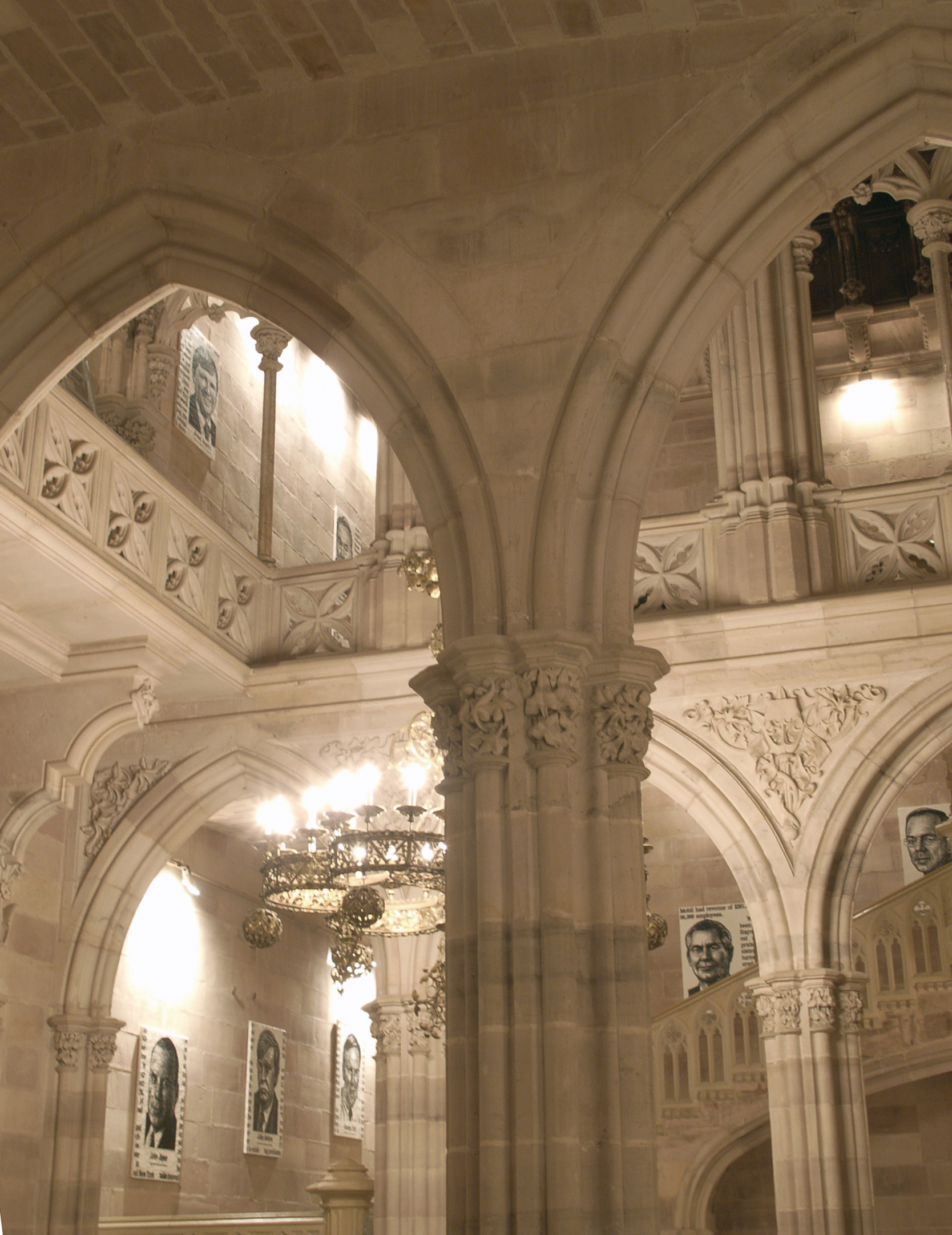

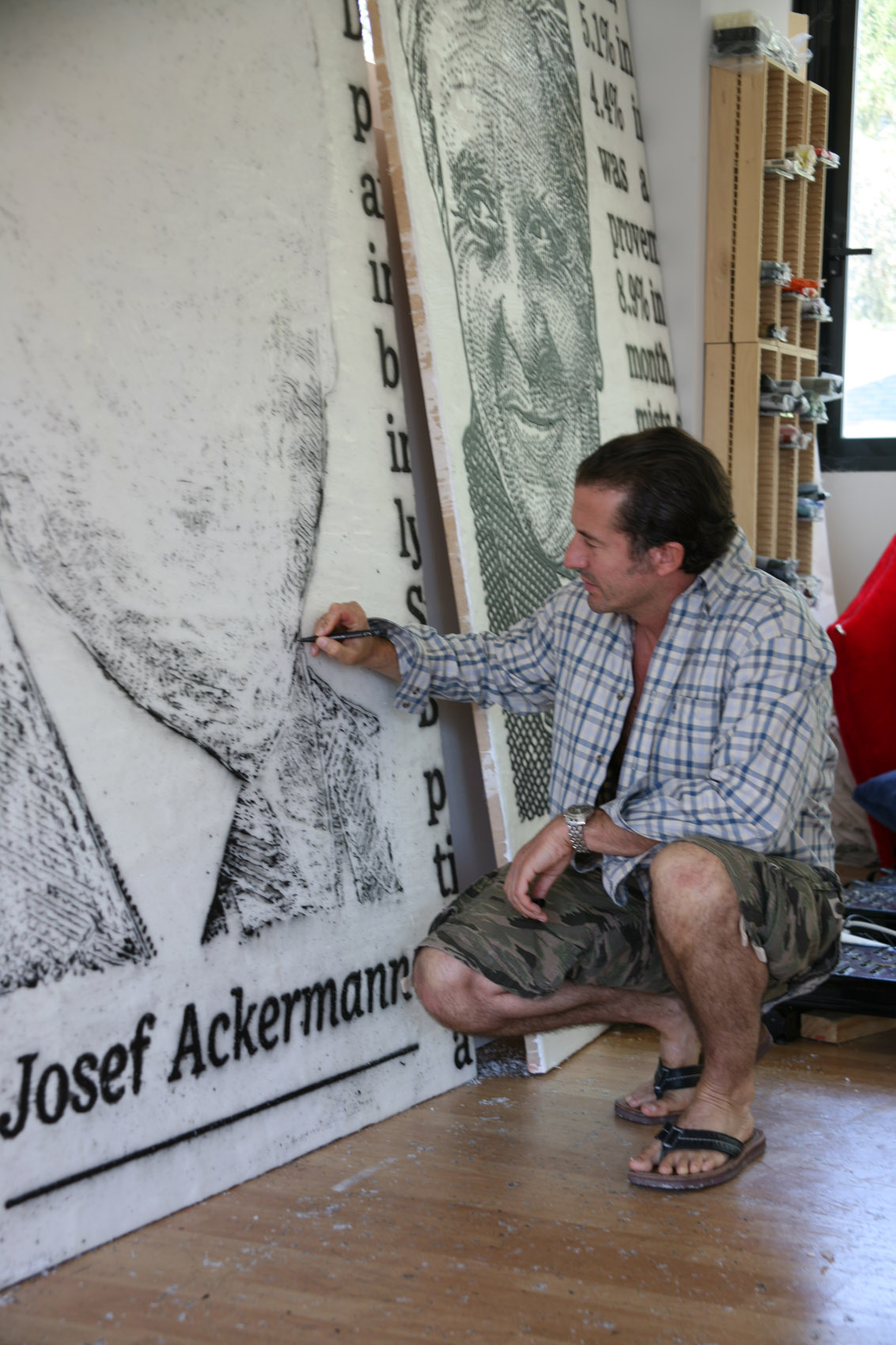
