= Ambra Medda =

Italian Entrepreneur

- Born: 1982 (age 43–44); Rhodes, Greece
- Occupation: Design consultant
- Known for: Design Miami
- Website: http://www.ambrameddaoffice.com

Ambra Medda (born 1982) is a London based design consultant who is the co-founder and director of Design Miami. She also co-founded the design website L’ArcoBaleno and headed a department at Christie's auction house.

== Career ==
In 2005, Medda co-founded Design Miami with real estate developer Craig Robins and was the fair's director until 2010. The annual event began as a salon for Italian design. A sister show, Design Miami Basel, was launched in Switzerland. As director, Medda created partnerships with notable galleries, collectors and companies. After stepping down, she continued to sit on committees as a creative consultant for the fair.

In 2013, Medda co-founded an e-commerce design website named L’ArcoBaleno. The site included collaborations with David Adjaye, Tom Dixon and Reed Krakoff. In 2015, she became Global Creative Director of the "20/21 Design" department at Christie's. Her department focused on auctioning design objects from the 20th and 21st century. In 2016, she founded Ambra Medda Office (AMO), a design consultancy firm where she advises clients such as Airbnb and Louis Vuitton. Medda is also involved with the Design Museum in London as a committee and trustee member.

Medda's other projects include curating an exhibit for Madrid artist, José María Cano in 2004 and writing the book "Destination: Limited-Edition Design" in 2008. She collaborated with Fendi in 2009 for the project Craft Punk and helped design a collection of handbags for Roger Vivier in 2014. In 2018, she organized visits to the Villa Borsani for the Milan Furniture Fair in Italy.

Medda has been described as being an "icon of the style" by Madame Figaro. Her design aesthetic has been interpreted by Alix Browne as "creating tension with unexpected combinations by mixing old and new".

== Background ==
Medda was born in Greece, to a Sardinian mother and Austrian father, and later lived in London and Milan. Growing up, she attended auctions with her mother, who was a design dealer and co-founder of the Themes and Variations gallery in London. She studied Chinese Language and Culture and Asian Art at University of London, and was previously married to American singer Damian Kulash. She currently lives in London with Edward Barber and their two daughters.
