= Humans since 1982 =

Swedish artist studio

- Formation: 2009; 17 years ago
- Type: Art studio
- Location: Stockholm
- Website: humanssince1982.com, clockclock.com

Humans since 1982 are a Stockholm, Sweden based artist studio established in 2009. Founding artists Bastian Bischoff and Per Emanuelsson met as postgraduate students at HDK Gothenburg in 2008. The studio is co-owned by engineer David Cox.

== Creative works ==
The ClockClock, as exhibited at Phillip De Pury's Connectors at the Saatchi Gallery in London in 2010.

The ClockClock (2008–2010) was the first collaborative project in which the studio started experimenting with using 24 analogue clock faces to create a digital typography, resulting in a kinetic sculpture that is also a functioning clock. The ClockClock was exhibited at Phillip De Pury's Connectors at the Saatchi Gallery in London in 2010.

The studio is most recognised for their ongoing series A million Times, which continues to build on the concept of The ClockClock through larger artworks with more clock faces. A million Times clock hands are programmed to move independently and in formation to create patterns between telling the time. A million Times artworks have been exhibited internationally at institutions and art events including: Now it the Time, 2019, at Art Wuzhen in China; Cooper Hewitt, Smithsonian Design Museum in New York; and Design Miami. Artworks from this series are also included in the permanent collections of Platform-L Contemporary Art Centre in Seoul; at the Mercedes-Benz Stadium in Atlanta; and Changi Airport in Singapore.

Their largest work to date A Million Times at Changi (2018) has 504 clock faces and is installed as part of the permanent public art collection at Changi Airport, Singapore in Terminal 2. At 7.5 meters wide by 3.4 meters tall, A Million Times at Changi is one of the biggest kinetic artworks in the world.

In June 2019, Humans since 1982 were announced as one of six international artists to collaborate with IKEA for the IKEA Art Event 2021.
