= Miami Design District =

Design District
- Neighborhood of Miami
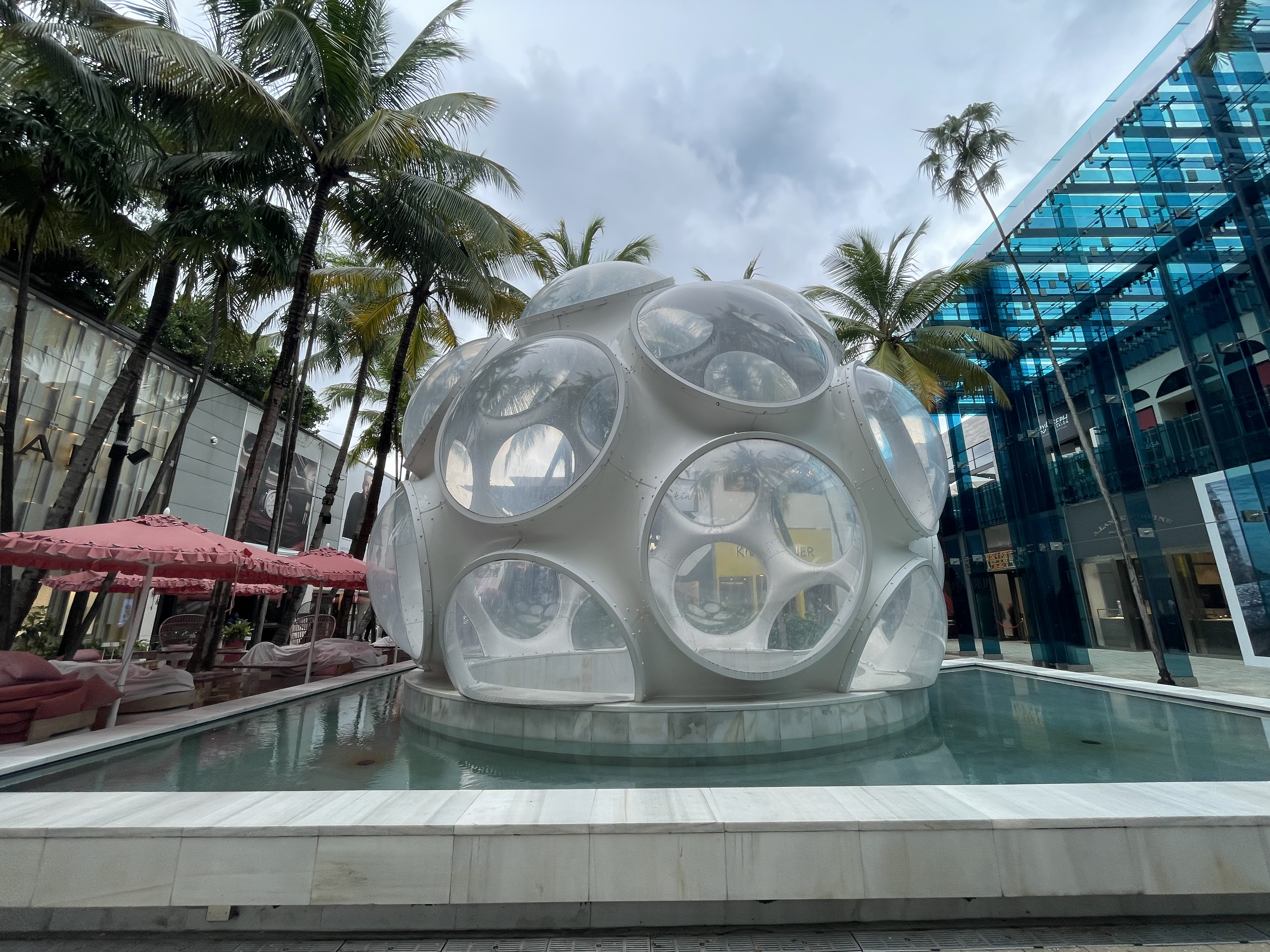
- Buckminster Fuller's Fly's Eye Dome
- Nickname: Buena Vista (historic name)
- Interactive map of Design District
- Coordinates: 25°48′46″N 80°11′32″W
- Country: United States
- State: Florida
- County: Miami-Dade County
- City: City of Miami

Government
  - City of Miami Commissioner: Richard Dunn
  - Miami-Dade Commissioner: Audrey Edmonson
  - House of Representatives: Daphne Campbell (D) and Cynthia A. Stafford (D)
  - State Senate: Larcenia Bullard (D), and Oscar Braynon (D)
  - U.S. House: Frederica Wilson (D)

Population (2010)
  - Total: 3,573
  - Density: 9,385/sq mi (3,624/km^{2})
- Time zone: UTC-05 (EST)
- ZIP Codes: 33127, 33137
- Area codes: 305, 786
- Website: www.miamidesigndistrict.net

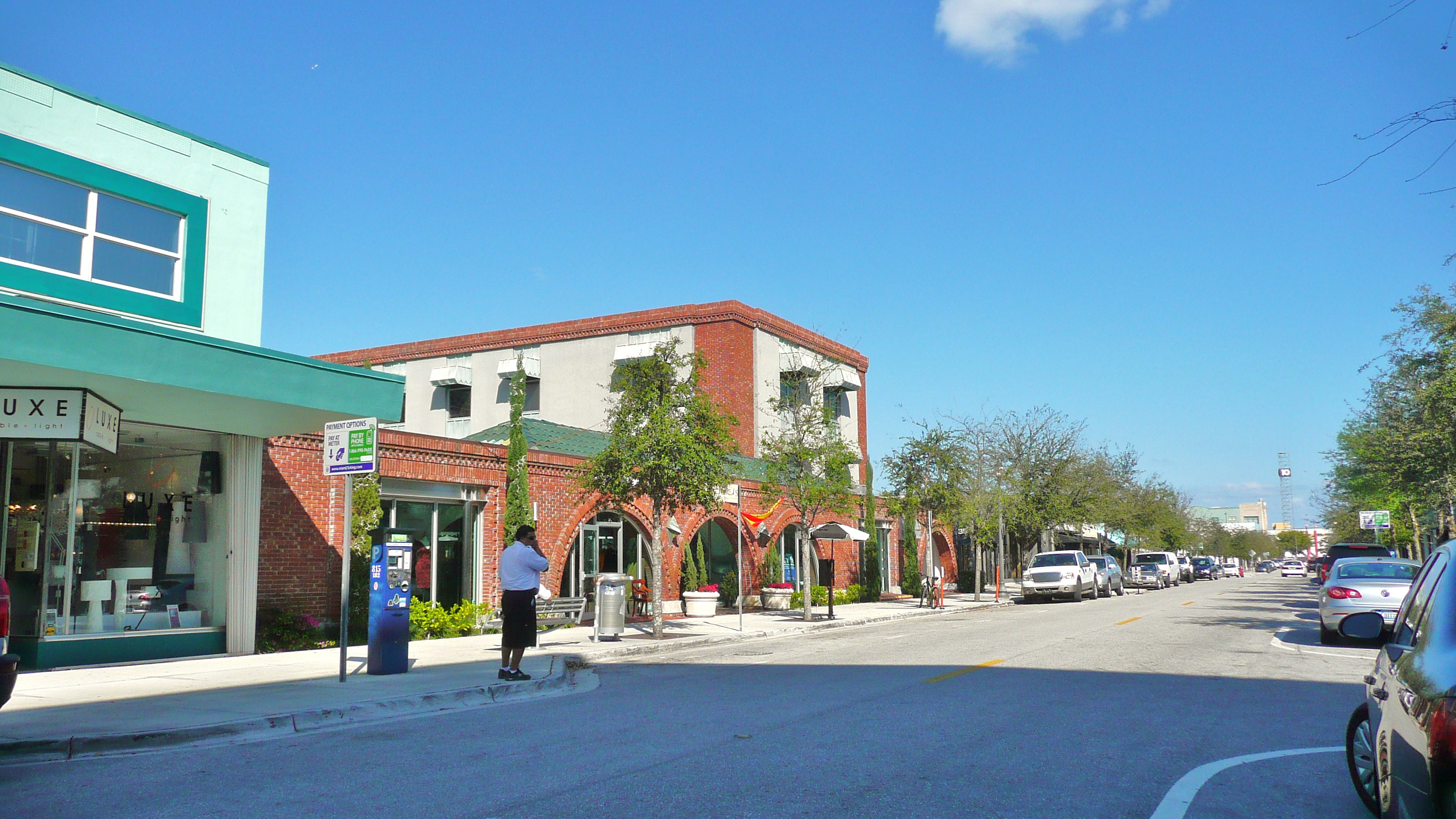
Typical street in the Design District

The Miami Design District is a neighborhood in Miami, Florida, United States, and a shopping, dining and cultural destination—home to over 130 art galleries, showrooms, creative services, architecture firms, luxury fashion stores, antiques dealers, eateries and bars.

Roughly bounded by North 36th Street (US 27) to the south, North 43rd Street to the north, West First Avenue to the west, and Biscayne Boulevard to the east, the Design District is in the crossroads of many prominent Miami neighborhoods: the artsy Wynwood neighborhood to the south, Lemon City (Little Haiti) and the historic 1920s Buena Vista neighborhood to the north, and the wealthy Upper East Side neighborhoods to the east.

After decades of falling into disrepair, the Design District was redeveloped in the early 2000s under the direction of developer Craig Robins, president and CEO of Dacra, and L Real Estate with investment from General Growth Properties.

High-end brands like Louis Vuitton, Dior, Prada, Saint Laurent and Hermes are located in the Design District as well as two Michelin Guide listed restaurants by Joël Robuchon, other eateries by award-winning chefs like Michael Schwartz and celebrities like Gloria and Emilio Estefan; a public art collection with works from Buckminster Fuller, Marc Newsom and Urs Fischer as well as museums and galleries like the Institute for Contemporary Art, Miami, The de la Cruz Collection of Contemporary Art and Locust Projects.

== History ==
The area of land that is now the Design District was once a pineapple farm in a neighborhood referred to as Buena Vista. Farm owner, T.V. Moore, built the historic Moore Building in the 1920s for his family furniture business. The Moore Furniture Building was one of the first stores in the U.S. dedicated strictly to furniture.

By the 1980s and early-1990s, the Design District had fallen into disrepair, and it wasn't until the late 1990s, and early 2000s, that art and design stores began reopening.

Credited to starting the district is Craig Robins, who purchased many run-down buildings in the 18 square block area and persuaded many top designers, such as Alison Spear, Peter Page, Kartell, and Luminaire, as well as furniture and textile designer Holly Hunt to open studios and showrooms in the area.

Throughout the 2000s, the Design District continued to grow in popularity, and with heavy public and private investment in the neighborhood, the streets and sidewalks were redone, and new trees were planted.

In 2010, Dacra, of which Craig Robins is the founder and CEO, and L Real Estate (now L Catterton) formed a partnership to develop the Design District into a luxury shopping and lifestyle destination featuring prominent architects from around the world and flagship locations of fashion brands like Dior, Hermes and Louis Vuitton.

Today, signs and names with the name Buena Vista can still be seen throughout the area such as the Buena Vista Post Office, and Buena Vista School.

On 1 August 2016, the Centers for Disease Control and Prevention issued a travel warning, advising pregnant women not to visit the Design District, Wynwood, and Midtown Miami areas to avoid getting the Zika virus. Governor Rick Scott lifted the area's "Zika Zone" designation on September 19, 2016.

== Shopping ==
Currently, there are over 80 stores open in The District and 70 home design showrooms.

The District is home to many flagship luxury stores including Balenciaga, Celine, Christian Louboutin, Dior, Dolce & Gabbana, Fendi, Giorgio Armani, Givenchy, Gucci, Louis Vuitton, Miu Miu, Prada, Saint Laurent and Tom Ford. The Design District houses one of the highest concentrations of jewelers in the world with jewelers and watchmakers like Bulgari, Cartier, Harry Winston, IWC Schaffhausen, Jaeger LeCoultre, Tiffany & Co., Van Cleef and Arpels and Vacheron Constantin.

Other fashion, beauty, and multibrand stores include beauty and wellness brands Aesop and Creed, plus contemporary brands like French labels Isabel Marant and BA&SH; Scandinavian brand, COS; as well as Rag and Bone, Theory and Alice + Olivia.

Design showrooms and stores in the Miami Design District include Eichholtz, Citco, Holly Hunt, Jonathan Adler, Luminaire, Minotti, Poliform, Ornare, Poltrona Frau and The Rug Company among others.

In 2009, Christian Louboutin was the first luxury retailer to open in the design district, marking a new era for the neighborhood. Later that year, Yohji Yamamoto opened in the Design District. In 2011, Louis Vuitton announced plans to open a Louis Vuitton store in the neighborhood by 2014, along with additional storefronts for other brands from the LVMH company including Sephora, Marc Jacobs, Givenchy, and Fendi.

In October 2011, Hermes, Cartier and Dior announced plans to move their stores from Bal Harbour Shops to the Design District in late 2011 and 2012. Design Within Reach opened an 11,000-square-foot design store in the district on Feb 1st, 2013.

The three-story, 13,000-square-foot Hermès store opened in November 2015 and is only the third U.S. flagship after Madison Avenue in New York City and Rodeo Drive in Beverly Hills, CA.

== Restaurants ==
The Design District offers a variety of dining options, including L’Atelier de Joël Robuchon, which was the only restaurant to be awarded Two Michelin Stars in the 2022 Florida Michelin Guide, and Le Jardinier, which was awarded One Michelin Star.

Other notable restaurants include James Beard Award-winning chef/owner Michael Schwartz's Michael's Genuine, Gloria and Emilio Estefan's Estefan Kitchen, plus the popular Mandolin Aegean Bistro and Ghee Indian Kitchen. Casual options include OTL—a café by David Grutman, Craig Robins and the team behind New York City's the Smile. The food hall, St. Roch Market includes 12 food and drink options like Italian concept Dal Plin, the vegan café Chef Chloe and southern comfort food by Coop.

2016 Food & Wine Best New Chef award-winner Brad Kilgore opened the neo-Japanese restaurant Kaido in the Design District in December 2018. In March 2019, Brad Kilgore was announced as a finalist for the prestigious James Beard award in the category of Best Chef South. He was the only Florida chef to be named as a James Beard award finalist in 2019.

Grammy Award-winning musician Pharrell Williams and David Grutman collaborated to open the restaurant Swan and upstairs bar, Bar Bevy, in December 2018. Swan seats 250 and features a mint-green and conch-shell pink interior designed by San Francisco-based designer Ken Fulk.

== Art galleries ==
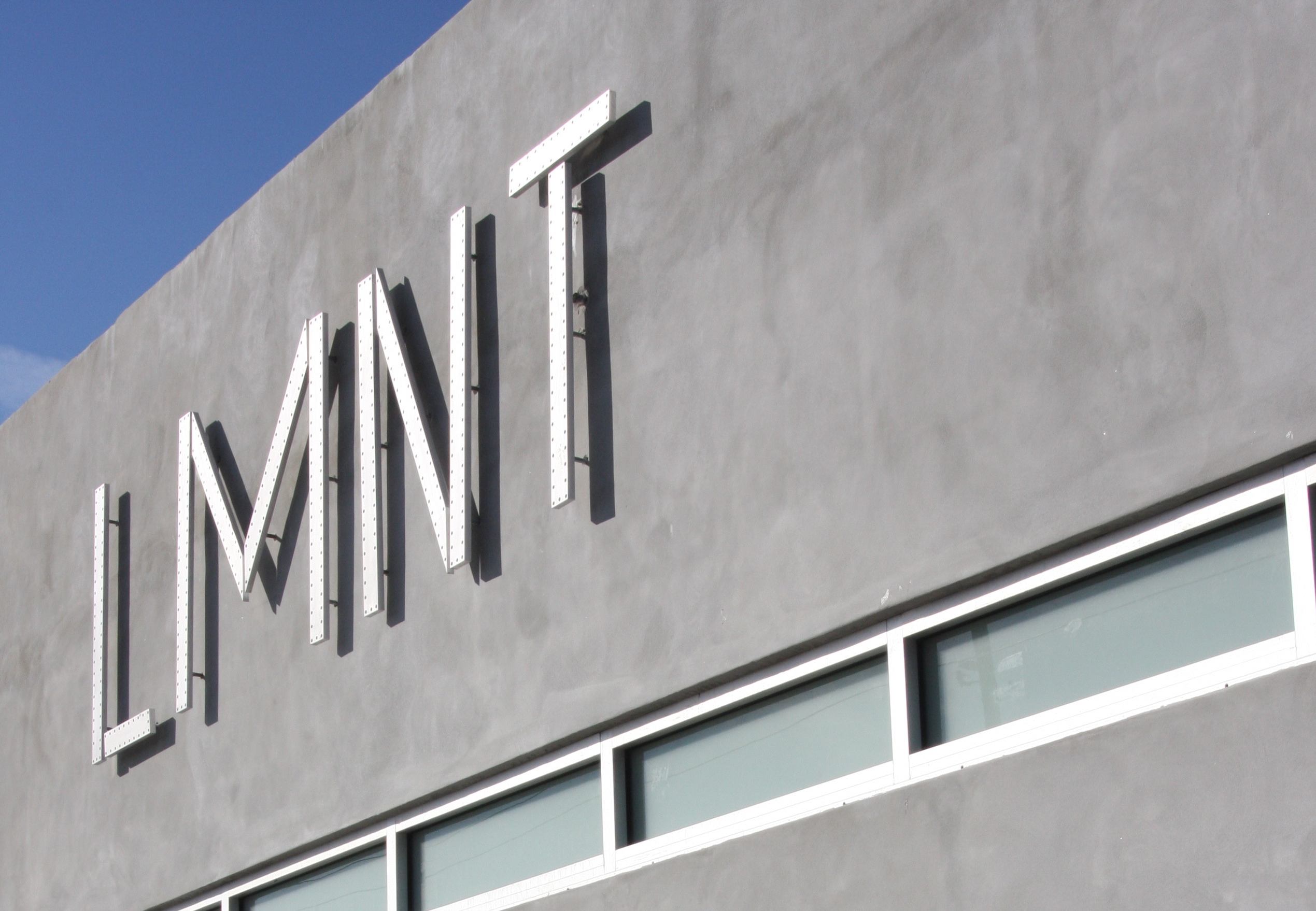
The Institute of Contemporary Art, Miami (ICA) is located on NE 41st in the Design District.

The Institute of Contemporary Art, Miami (ICA Miami) opened in its new, 37,500-square-foot space in December 2017. The building was designed by Spanish firm, Aranguren + Gallegos Arquitectos. The museum is free and open to the public and also has an outdoor sculpture garden. The Institute of Contemporary Art, Miami (ICA Miami), promotes the work of contemporary artists, and the exchange of art and ideas throughout the Miami region and internationally. Through exhibitions, programs, and collections, ICA showcases the work of established and emerging artists, and aims to advance the public appreciation and understanding of innovative and experimental art. The ICA has year-round programming with series like ICA Speaks featuring artists from the museums permanent collection.

Next door to the ICA, the de la Cruz Collection of Contemporary Art houses the private collection of Rosa and Carlos de la Cruz. The 30,000-square-foot museum features works from the 1980s on, and it is also free and open to the public. Among other art galleries and organizations in the Miami Design District are Locust Projects, Primary Projects, Swampspace, Maman Fine Arts and Markowicz Fine Art.

The Design District has a public art collection with pieces on view throughout the neighborhood like Buckminster Fuller's Fly's Eye Dome in Palm Court, Zaha Hadid's Elastika in the Moore Building, Marc Newsom's Dash Fence, Urs Fischer's Bus Stop in Paradise Plaza and Fun Part 1 and Part 2 by John Baldessari located on City View Garage.

== Culture ==
Art programming in the Design District includes Public Art Tours and a Performance Series with past performances by the Miami Symphony Orchestra, Jon Secada, Sheila E. and Emily Estefan.

The week of Art Basel Miami has historically brought performances and events to the Miami Design District like Pharrell Williams performing in 2010 and 2013, and an exhibition co-organized by Larry Gagosian and Jeffrey Deitch starting in 2015.

== Demographics ==
As of 2000, the population of the Miami Design District had 1,116 people. The zip codes for the Miami Design District include 33127 and 33137. The area covers 0.249 square miles (0.64 km^{2}). As of 2000, there were 522 males and 594 females. The median age for males were 26.2 years old, while the median age for females were 25.4 years old. The average household size had 3.1 people, while the average family size had 3.6 members. The percentage of married-couple families (among all households) was 32.9%, while the percentage of married-couple families with children (among all households) was 17.5%, and the percentage of single-mother households (among all households) was 20.7%. 5.8% of population in other group homes. The percentage of never-married males 15 years old and over was 19.2%, while the percentage of never-married females 15 years old and over was 19.5%.

As of 2000, the percentage of people that speak English not well or not at all made up 20.2% of the population. The percentage of residents born in Florida was 41.6%, the percentage of people born in another U.S. state was 12.1%, and the percentage of native residents but born outside the U.S. was 7.3%, while the percentage of foreign born residents was 39.0%.

== Transportation ==
The Design District is served by Metrobus throughout the area, the City of Miami Trolley Biscayne-Brickell route and by the Miami Metrorail in adjoining Allapattah less than a mile due west at:

- Allapattah (36th Street/US 27 and NW 12th Avenue)

The Design District is also home to several notable parking garages that are part of a larger Miami design trend in "parkitecture", a portmanteau of the words "parking" and "architecture", which refers to architecturally significant parking garages.

City View Garage, which houses 22,660 square feet of retail space and 14,790 square feet of office space within the Design District, won an Award of Excellence for Architectural Achievement from the International Parking & Mobility Institute in 2016. A portion of the garage, the east façade, was designed by IwamotoScott Architecture and features architectural metalwork by Zahner. A portion of the south façade features public art by John Baldessari, and the north façade was designed by the architecture design and engineering firm TimHaahs and features precast concrete panels.

The Museum Garage opened in winter 2019 in the Design District and features a colorful collage of designs by different design and architecture firms. In March 2019, Narcity contributor Jannely Espinal declared the Museum Garage the "coolest place for epic photo shoots" and "the world’s most unique garage".

== Education ==
Miami-Dade County Public Schools operates area public schools:

- Design and Architecture High School

The Italian fashion and design school Istituto Marangoni opened its first school in the United States in the Miami Design District in 2018. The school has famous alumni like Domenico Dolce, Franco Moschino and Paula Cademartori. The advisory board in the Americas includes designers like Cademartori and Esteban Cortazar and Design District developer, Craig Robins.

The private K-8 school Centner Academy is in the district.

== See also ==
- Arts & Entertainment District
