= LIV (nightclub) =

Nightclub in Miami Beach and Las Vegas

LIV Miami
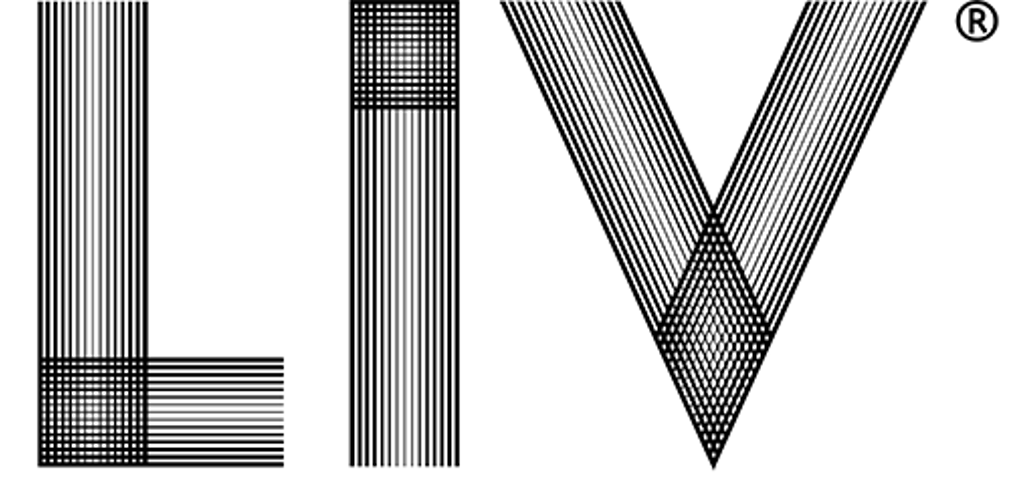

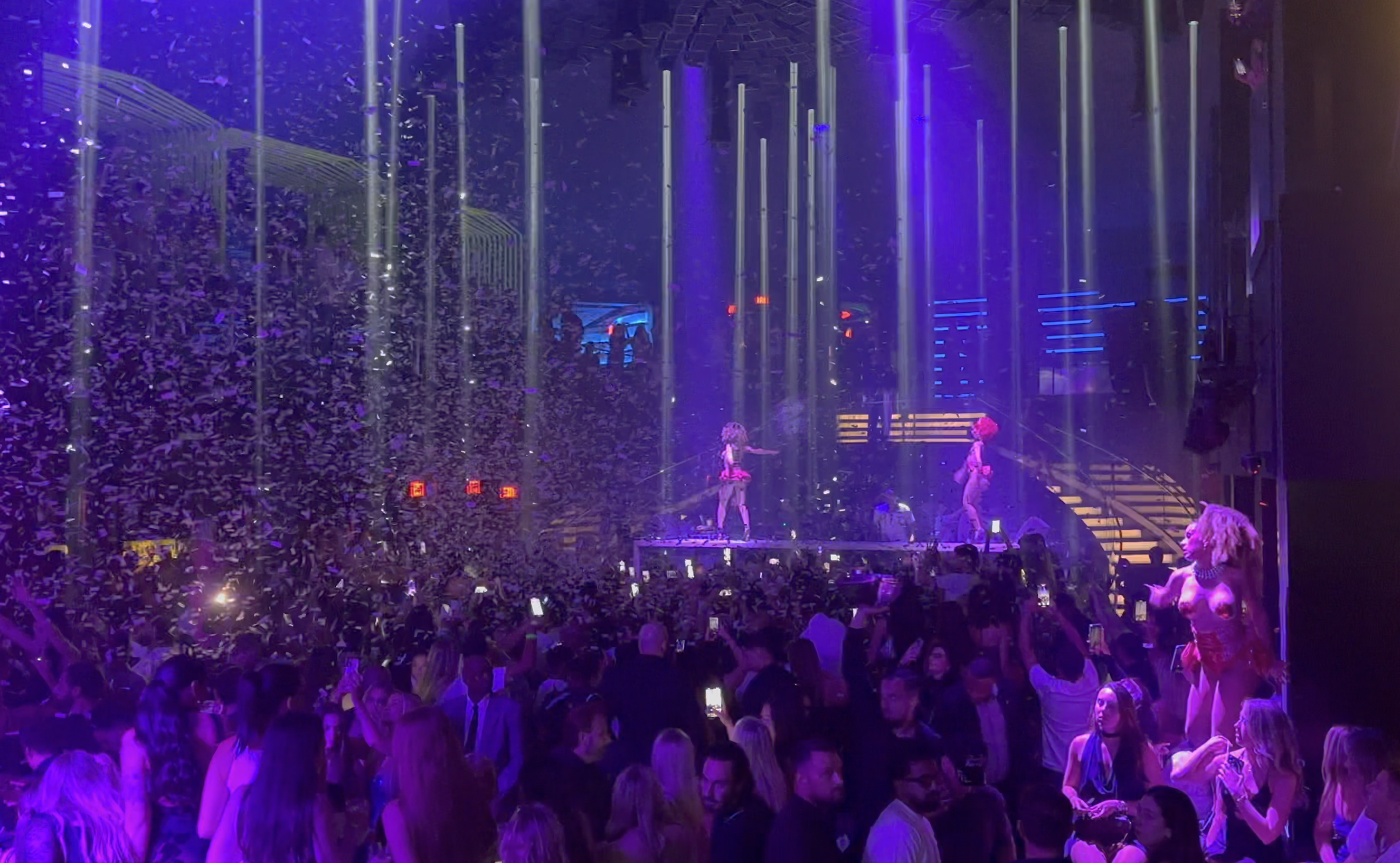
- LIV Miami in 2025
- Interactive map of LIV Miami
- Address: 4441 Collins Avenue; Miami Beach, Florida; United States
- Coordinates: 25.8178°N 80.1227°W
- Owner: Live Nation Entertainment (51%); Groot Hospitality (49%)
- Operator: Groot Hospitality
- Type: Nightclub

Construction
- Opened: 2009
- Renovated: 2016

Website
- livnightclub.com/miami

LIV Las Vegas
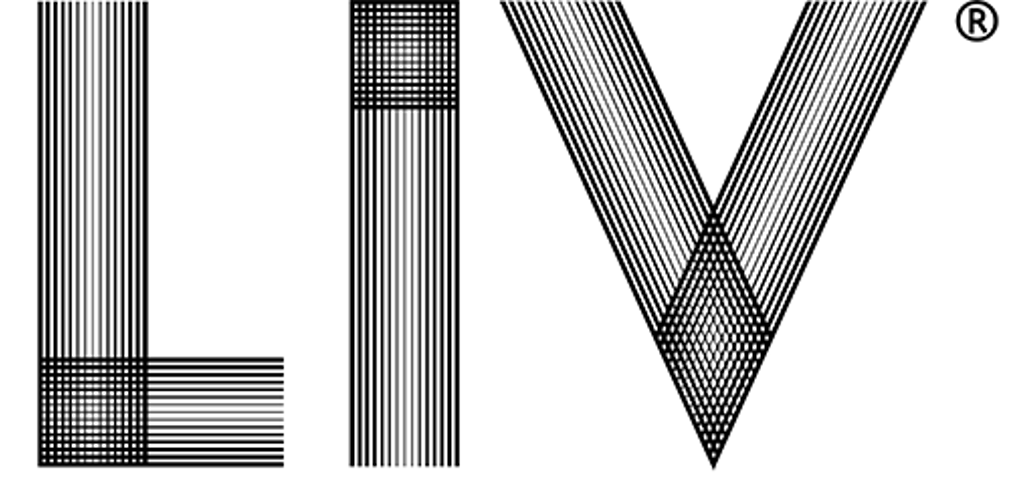

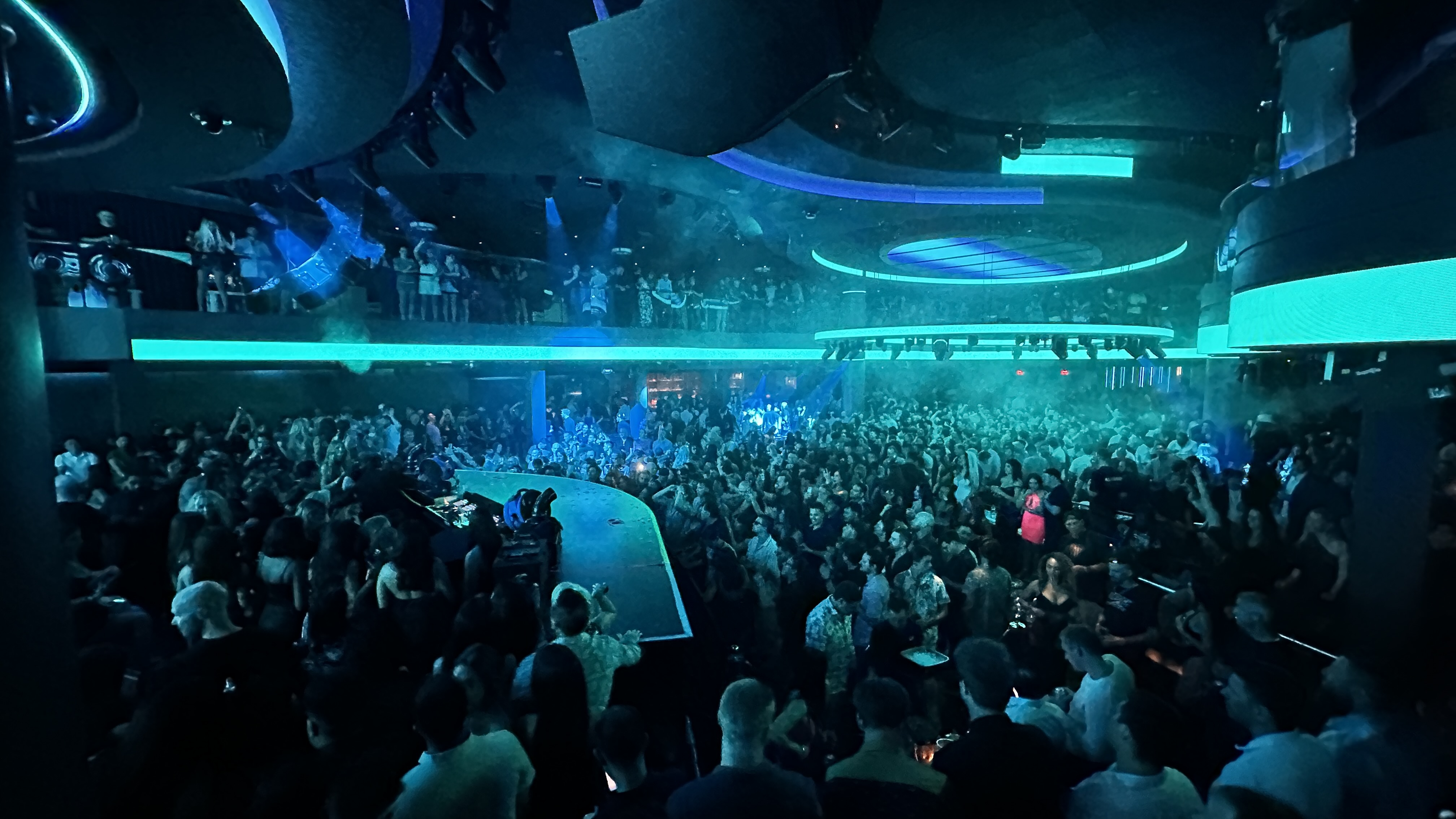
- LIV Las Vegas in 2025
- Interactive map of LIV Las Vegas
- Address: 2777 S Las Vegas Blvd; Las Vegas NV; United States
- Coordinates: 36.13672°N 115.16093°W
- Owner: Live Nation Entertainment (51%); Groot Hospitality (49%)
- Operator: Groot Hospitality
- Type: Nightclub

Construction
- Opened: 2023

Website
- livnightclub.com/las-vegas

LIV is a nightclub with two locations in the United States, LIV Miami, located inside the Fontainebleau Miami Beach, and its sister club, LIV Las Vegas, located inside the Fontainebleau Las Vegas. First founded in 2008 in Miami Beach by David Grutman, the club attained its name from the Roman numerals for the number 54, named for the opening year of the Fontainebleau Miami Beach, as well as being a reference to Studio 54, which Grutman has compared the club to. LIV has become a celebrity hotspot with its hip hop programming "LIV on Sunday" in particular often being referenced in contemporary music and media.

LIV opened its Las Vegas location in 2023. Both locations are owned and operated by Grutman's Groot Hospitality, formerly known as MMG Nightlife. In 2019, 51% of Groot Hospitality was acquired by Live Nation Entertainment.

== History ==
LIV originally opened as the main new addition of the Soffer family's billion dollar renovation of the Miami Beach Fontainebleau hotel. Its opening event in 2008 was a Victoria's Secret fashion show.

In 2012, LIV expanded to the Hard Rock Stadium, then known as the Sun Life Stadium, as the brand name for a level of club suites.

In 2013, 80% of LIV's then-parent organization, Miami Marketing Group (MMG), was acquired by Robert F. X. Sillerman. Sillerman's company, SFX, experienced financial difficulties and filed for Chapter 11 bankruptcy protection in 2016, and by 2018, Grutman had acquired the club back and reorganized it into Groot Hospitality.

In 2016, LIV Miami entered into a two-month and ten million dollar renovation which added a steel truss lighting structure nicknamed "The Spider". The first acts to perform after the renovation was complete were Travis Scott and Skrillex.

In 2019, 51% of Groot Hospitality was acquired by Live Nation Entertainment for $25.5 million at a valuation of $50 million.

In 2020, LIV Miami closed its doors when Miami-Dade County ordinances put into effect in response to the COVID-19 pandemic introduced limits to the club's operating capacity—cutting it by 50%—while mandating operating hours which required closure at midnight. In lieu of adhering to those restrictions, Grutman opted to close the club entirely, saying "We're going to open it when we can give the right experience". A peak in COVID cases to 15,000 newly confirmed infections per day also contributed to Grutman's choosing to keep the club closed during this time, saying he "didn't want to contribute to the spread". In October 2021, the midnight curfew which had been the single most restrictive order persuading the club to stay closed was finally lifted.

In 2023, upon the arrival of the Saudi-backed LIV Golf tournament in Miami to compete against the PGA Tour, Grutman's nightclub filed a notice of opposition to LIV Golf's trademark applications. Groot Hospitality alleged that LIV Golf's brand is highly similar to the nightclub in "sight, sound, meaning, and overall commercial impression", and successfully blocked LIV Golf from filing its trademarks.

=== LIV on Sunday ===
LIV on Sunday is a hip hop party held on Sunday nights at LIV Miami, usually used by rap artists for special concerts or releases, and regarded by The Miami Herald as a cultural institution of hip hop. LIV on Sunday is hosted by Michael Gardner's Headliner Marketing Group. The weekly party, nicknamed "church" within the rap community, first started in 2009, when Grutman invited Gardner to host a Sunday rap party.

In 2024, LIV on Sunday started its hall of fame, with Lil Wayne as its first inductee.

=== LIV Las Vegas & LIV Beach ===
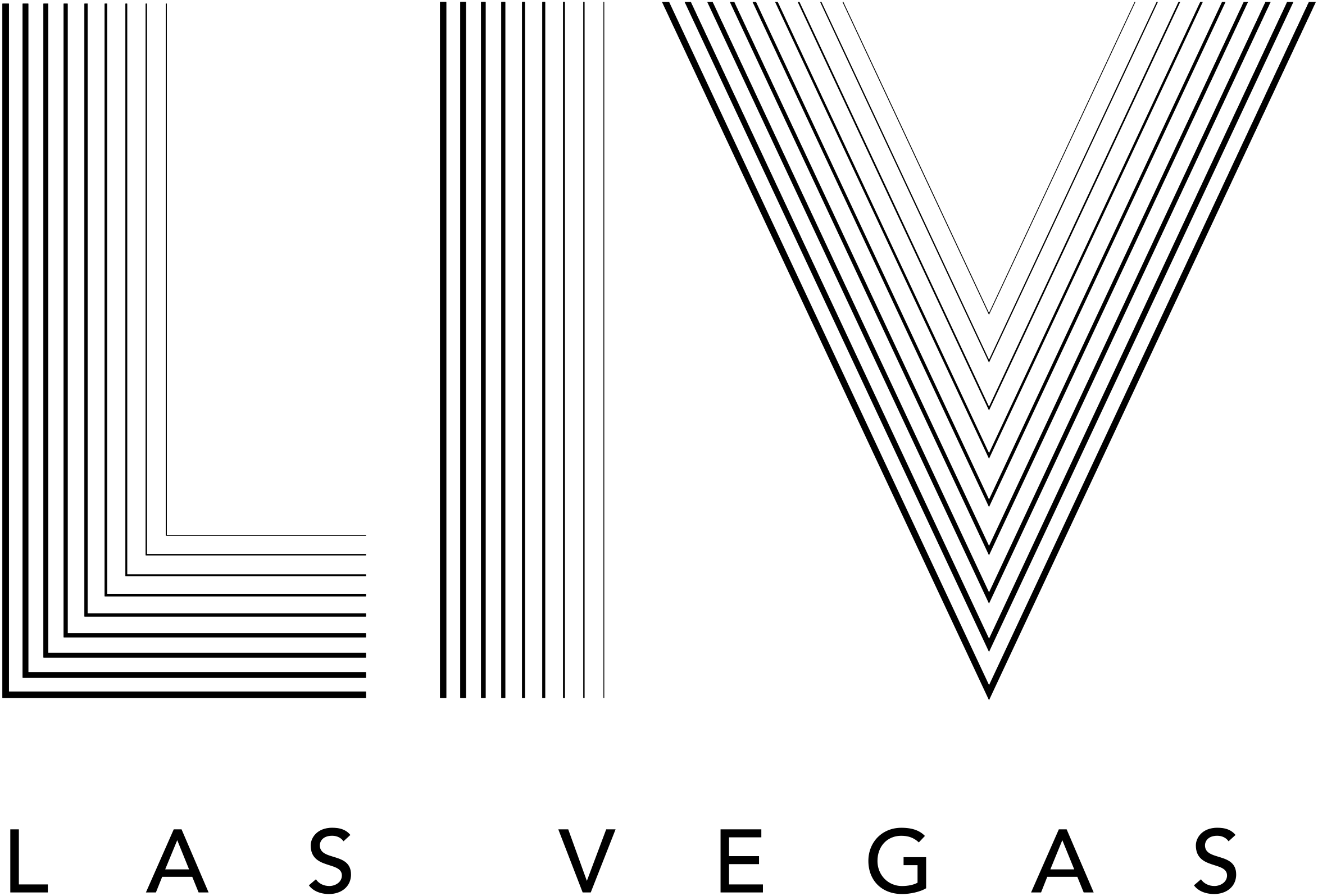
LIV Las Vegas formerly used this logo, before using the Miami logo for both clubs.

The long-unfinished Fontainebleau Las Vegas was reacquired by Donald Soffer's son Jeffery in 2021. That same year, the younger Soffer learned that Grutman was preparing to sign a deal with another Las Vegas resort to bring Groot Hospitality concepts to the Las Vegas Strip. Soffer, who preferred entering into a deal with Grutman himself, called Grutman to say "Do not sign this deal. I'm going to get the Fontainebleau Las Vegas back. I'm going to need you". Grutman, in agreeing to change course and otherwise partner with Soffer, noted how Soffer was "the one man to make him not sign his other deal." Thus, Fontainebleau and Groot Hospitality entered into a strategic partnership whereby LIV would open a Las Vegas location, alongside two other Groot Hospitality concepts: Asian fusion concept Komodo and steakhouse Papi Steak. As part of the expansion to Las Vegas, LIV would also get a dayclub, LIV Beach.

John Summit was named as the first resident DJ at LIV Las Vegas. LIV Las Vegas' demand was overwhelming; during its opening show, Grutman noted that LIV had to turnaway over 1,000 people to see Summit perform; LIV knew it needed to immediately expand, and entered into a months-long renovation, closing in November 2024 before reopening in March 2025. LIV also made the decision to unify operations between LIV Las Vegas and LIV Beach, creating an experience more akin to a music festival than a traditional club. Groot also introduced a "GA+" premium backstage ticketing option, giving fans access to a private bar.

== Interior design ==
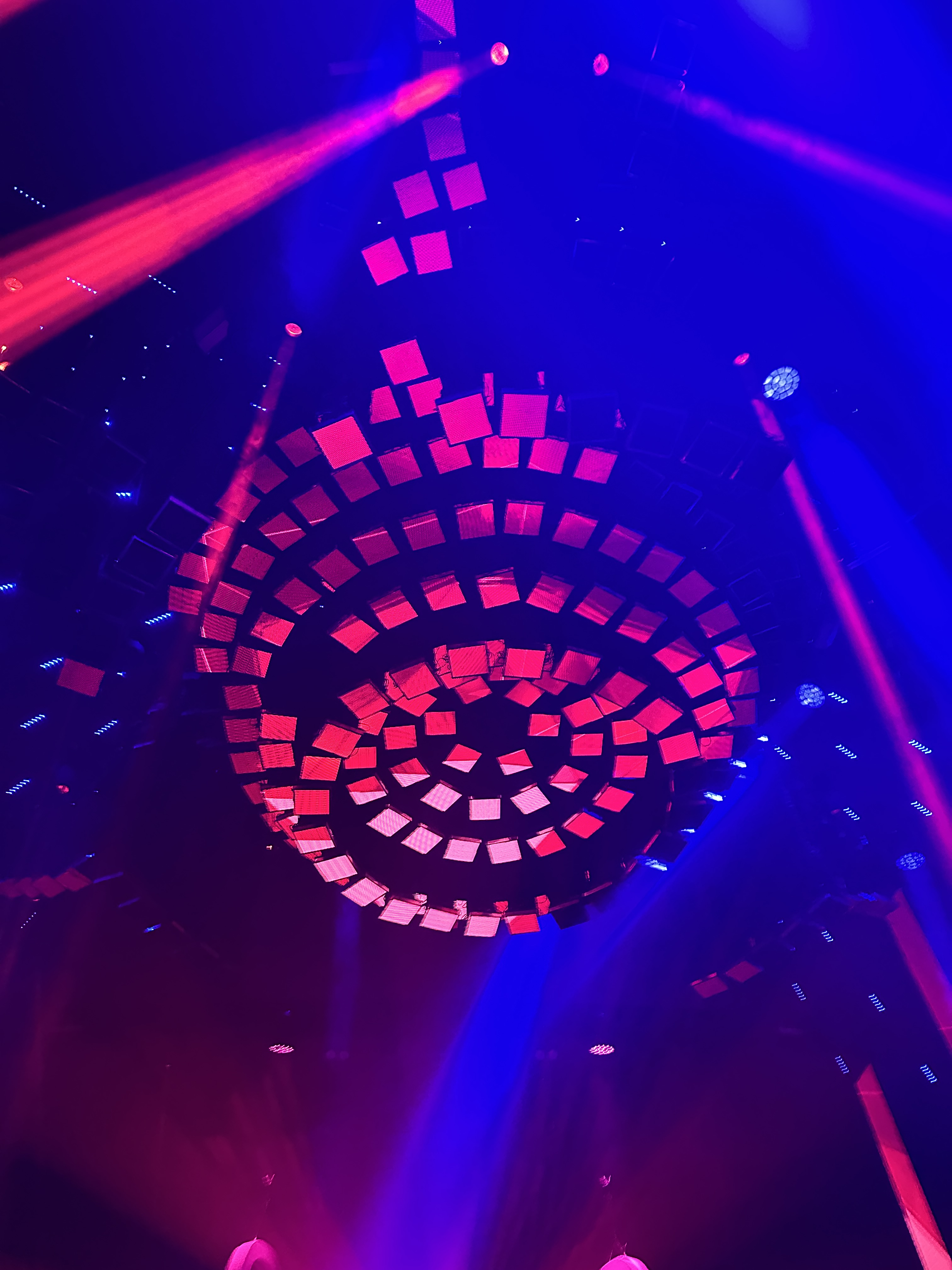
The Spider at LIV Miami, a lighting system added during the 2016 renovation of the club

=== LIV Miami ===
LIV Miami is a 19,000-square-foot two-story nightclub with a mezzanine in the rear of the club. With a maximum capacity of 1,100 people, the club is enclosed by an 80-foot dome holding 870 light fixtures within it; each light fixture is fully controllable by the club. The club's staircase splits into two paths midway down, with the space in between the paths housing the DJ booth. The upper level contains private skyboxes available for bottle service, and three bars also populate the club. The rear mezzanine can be converted into a stage by removing its railing. Some of the lighting was supplied by Focus Lighting and SJ Lighting, with SJ's owner Steve Lieberman commenting that LIV was "an extremely fast-track project, probably at most three-and-a-half-months, which is pretty quick from design to development."

In 2016, a $10 million renovation added "The Spider", a steel truss with 400 LED screens. The Spider, designed by SJ Lighting, has seven "legs" with 410 staggered screens that extend across the breadth of the ceiling. The legs are connected to columns which have their own synchronized LED screens spanning from the Spider's legs to the dance floor. The installation of the Spider constituted 30% of the club's renovation budget. LIV later upgraded to an L-Acoustics L-Series sound system in 2024.

=== LIV Las Vegas ===
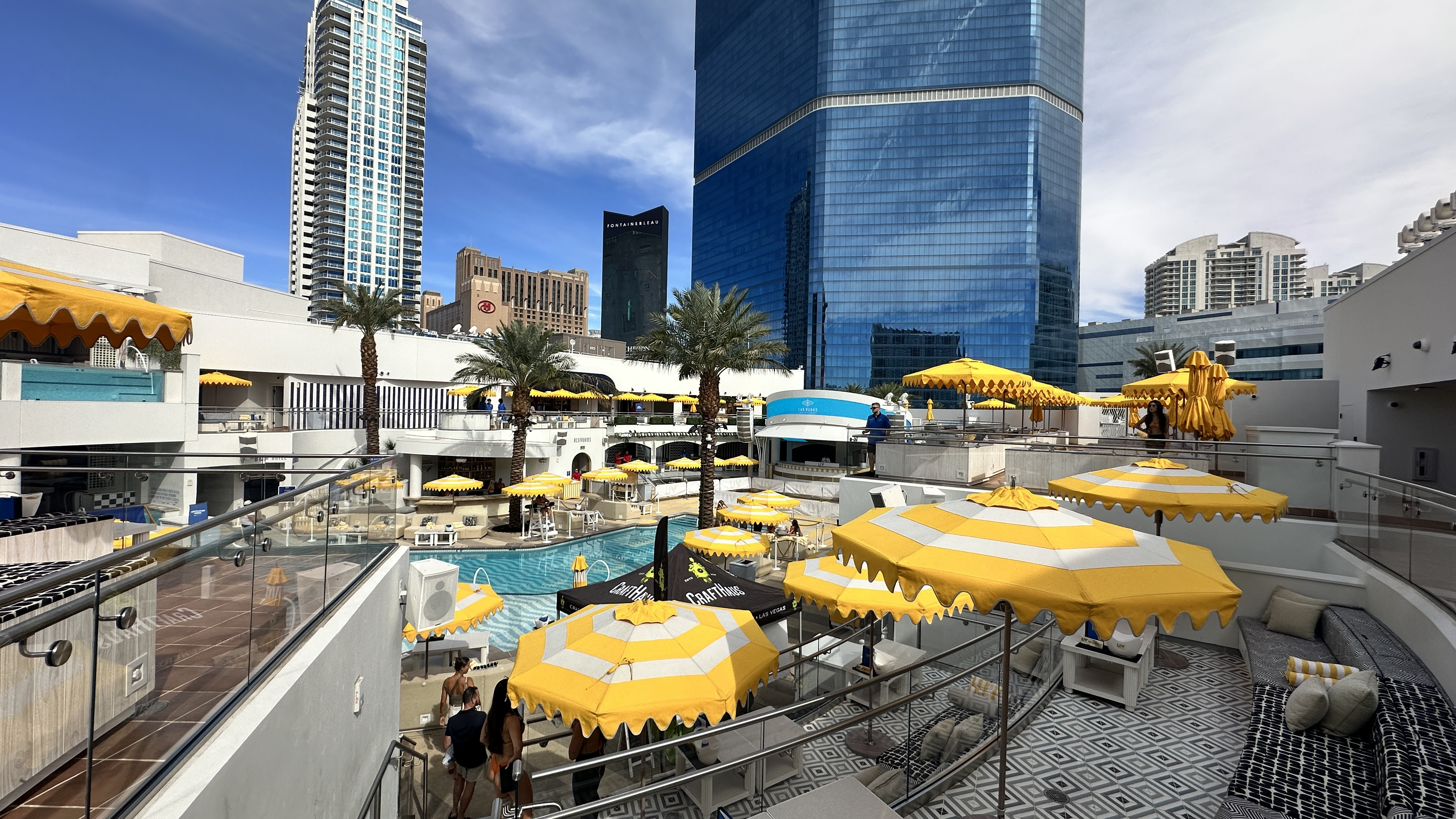
LIV Beach in 2025

Designed by David Rockwell's group, LIV Las Vegas originally opened with a size of 50,000 square feet. The club's central video structure is a custom-built system with articulating panels and rings, and a sound system utilizing Funktion-One speakers. SJ Lighting returned to build the lighting system for LIV Las Vegas. LIV's design philosophy was centered around the idea of a stadium, and originally opened with 62 tables.

Both LIV Las Vegas and LIV Beach are built around the DJ booth, with the VIP tables closest to the booth reservable by patrons for a $25,000 fee. LIV Beach and LIV Las Vegas are able to hold about 2,000 people. LIV Beach also houses six bungalows, each with its own private pool.

The 2024–2025 renovation expanded LIV Las Vegas to 80,000 square feet, while lowering the stage and extending the dance floor. Fontainebleau Las Vegas stated that the renovations came at "an eight-figure cost". LIV Beach also expanded its table count by 33, and with the merged venue, LIV Beach serves as overflow for the nightclub portion of LIV. The venues also started selling pizza from Miami Slice.

== Cultural impact and reception ==
By 2011, LIV Miami was the seventh-highest grossing nightclub in the United States as well as the second best in the world according to Reuters. The club is often the site of numerous celebrity encounters, with one particular night after Florida lifted its COVID-19 pandemic restrictions hosting Diddy, Jamie Foxx, Floyd Mayweather, 2 Chainz, Anuel AA, Lil Baby, Lil Wayne and Jake Paul, the last of which joined right after scoring a boxing win. Some people who have worked at LIV have become famous in their own right for working with the club, such as talent director Sarah Lucey (also known as Irish Sarah) and Grutman himself. Grutman further views LIV as a "Disney World for champions", with it hosting the Miami Heat, Dallas Mavericks, and many UFC fighters and boxers after their victories.

In 2012, LIV was ranked as the fifth highest grossing nightclub in the United States, and the only one from Miami within the ten highest grossing, estimated by Nightclub & Bar Magazine to generate between $35 and $45 million that year. In 2015, Nightclub & Bar magazine estimated that LIV Miami made $40–$45 million, making it the fifth highest grossing nightclub that year. The club is regarded by Time Out as a club which has set the standard for other megaclubs worldwide as "opulent and turnt beyond belief".

LIV on Sunday has been particularly impactful on hip hop. Various rap songs have referenced the Sunday night party by name, including "Hustle Hard" by Ace Hood and Lil Wayne in the lyric "LIV on Sunday, King of Diamonds Monday", and Meek Mill's song "Amen" which references the party in the chorus "do LIV on Sunday like a church". Meek Mill also filmed the music video for "Amen" at LIV Miami.

== Incidents ==
On December 7, 2014, when LIV Miami was hosting a birthday party for DJ Khaled, Drake was allegedly punched by Sean "Diddy" Combs. The allegations, made by north Miami DJ Sam Sneak among other witnesses, detailed that Combs shouted to Drake "you will never disrespect me" before Drake left LIV. Neither Drake nor Combs filed a police report.

In the early morning of Monday, December 10, 2018, during another birthday party for DJ Khaled, four patrons were arrested outside of LIV for instigating a brawl, among those included in the arrest were Canadian singer Tory Lanez.

== Notable performers ==
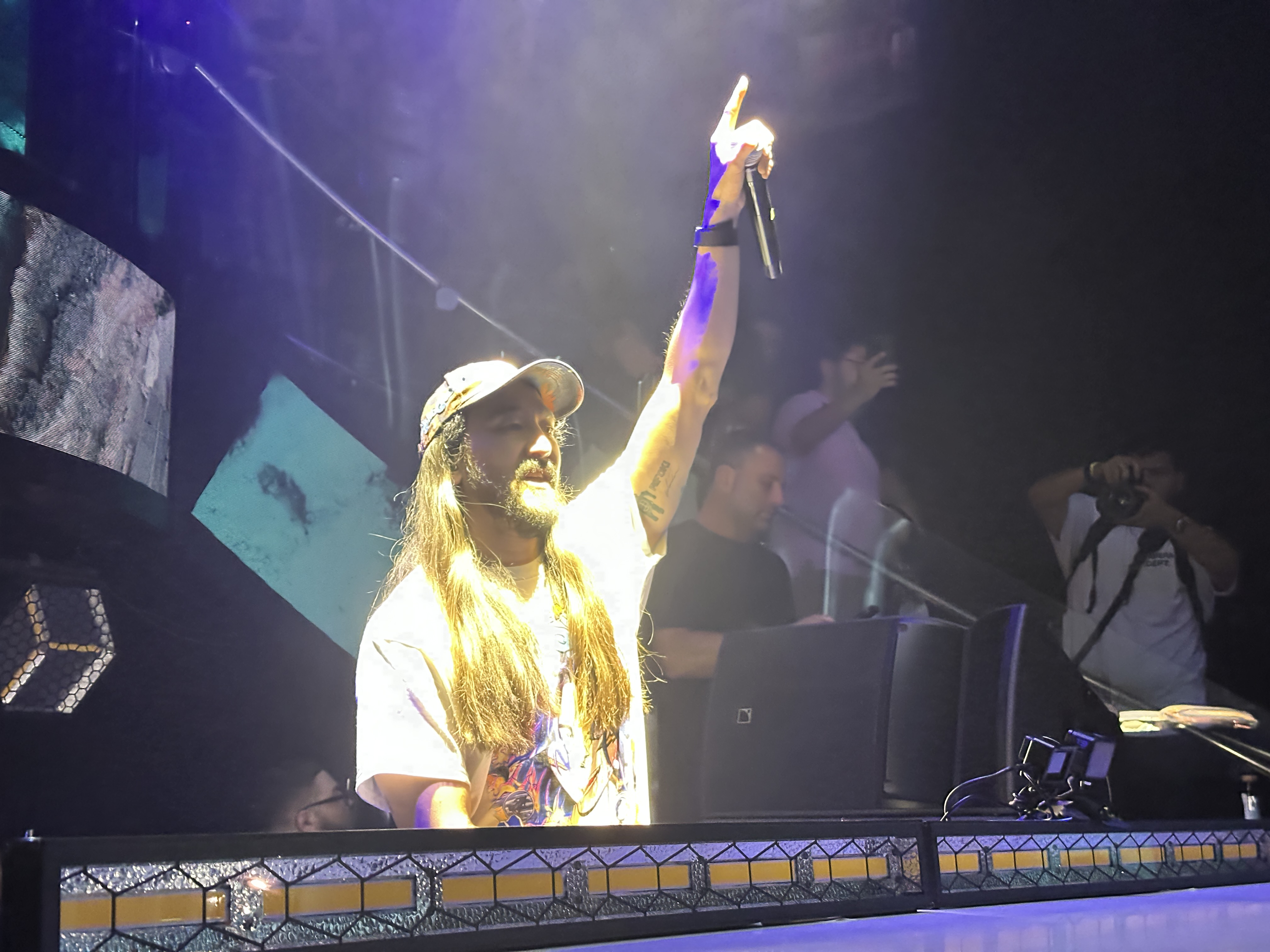
Steve Aoki performing at LIV Miami in July 2025

=== LIV Miami ===
- Alesso
- Meek Mill
- Jeezy
- John Summit
- Lil Wayne
- Rick Ross
- Sexyy Red
- Shakira
- Steve Aoki
- Winnie Harlow

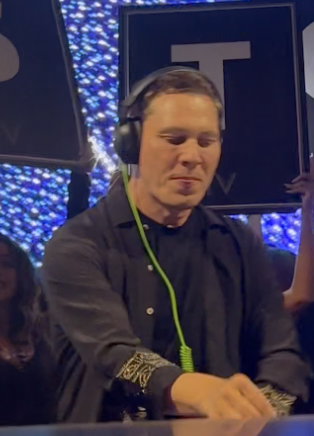
Tiësto performing at LIV Las Vegas in March 2026

=== LIV Las Vegas ===
- Crankdat
- David Guetta
- Dom Dolla
- John Summit
- Kettama
- Knock2
- Machine Gun Kelly
- Metro Boomin
- Sidepiece
- Tiësto
