= Charles Riva =

French art collector (born 1974)

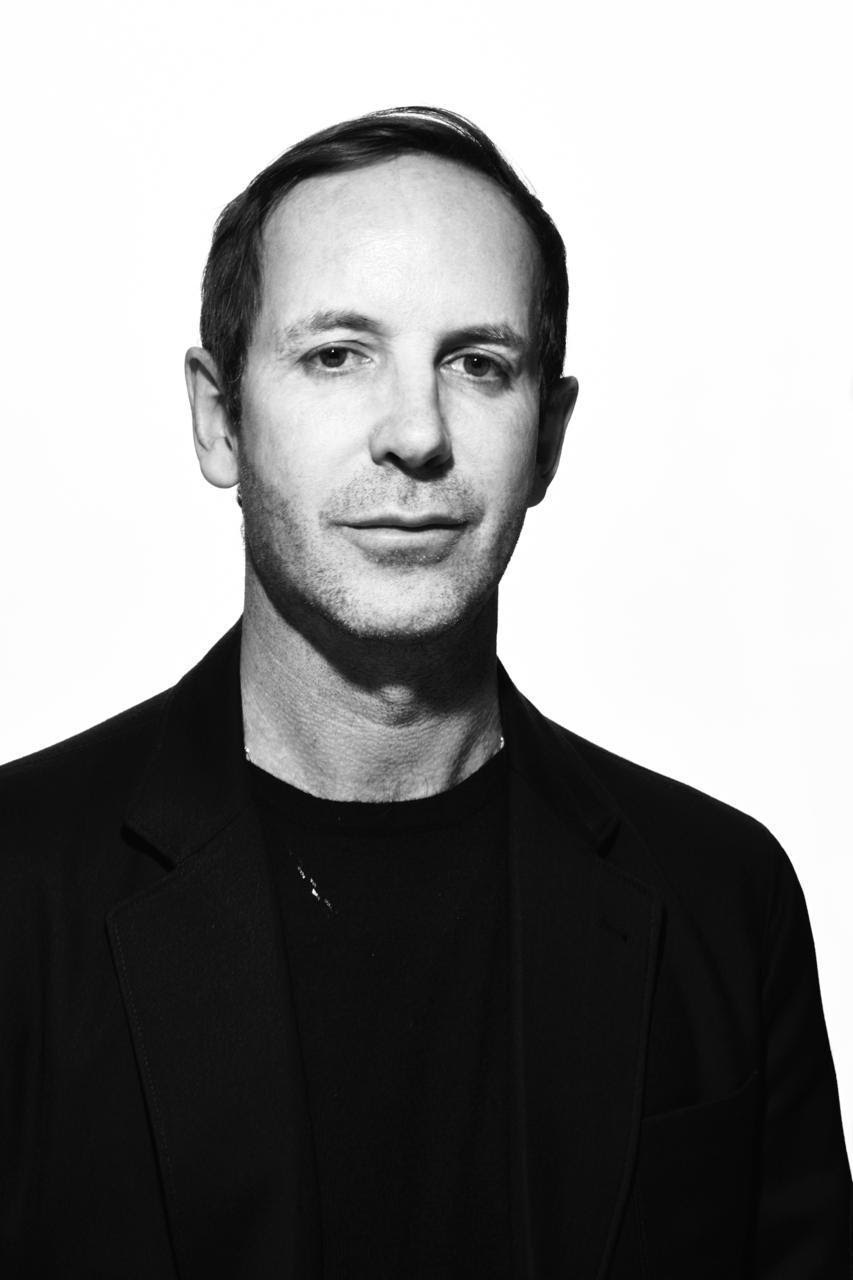
- Portrait of Charles Riva by Ian Tong. New York. November 2024
- Born: 1974 (age 51–52); Neuilly-sur-Seine, France
- Occupations: Art advisor Art collector
- Known for: Founder of Charles Riva Collection
- Children: 2

Charles Riva (born 1974) is a French-Italian post-war and contemporary art advisor, dealer, and collector. He is known for organizing international exhibitions in Brussels, Paris, Palm Beach and New York City.

The Charles Riva Collection includes over 300 works of art, spanning from sculpture, to video and painting. Artists included in the collection are George Condo, Philip Guston, Sherrie Levine, Roy Lichtenstein, Paul McCarthy, Daniel Richter, Sterling Ruby, Jenny Holzer, Frank Stella, Andy Warhol, and Christopher Wool to name just a few. He has been collecting art for over 20 years.

== Biography ==
Riva was born in Neuilly-sur-Seine, France, to a French mother and Italian father. He was raised in an artistic family; his mother is a painter, and his father was an architect. Riva's interest in art deepened during his teenage years, and by the age of 16, he was already involved in selling paintings from his mother's studio.

== Career ==
Riva began his career in art in the early 1990s, working in Paris for a dealer specializing in the secondary market. At that time Riva learned about the art business as he handled works by Marc Chagall, Andy Warhol, and Salvador Dalí. At 19, he first acquired a print, Brushstroke, by Roy Lichtenstein; it hangs in his New York apartment.

In 1998, he opened his first art gallery, the Riva Gallery in New York City, starting his professional career as an art dealer, advisor, and curator.

In 2002, He expanded his work by opening Sutton Lane galleries, with two locations in London and two in Paris. Operating until 2008, under his direction the gallery featured works by Roe Etheridge, Cheyney Thompson, Reena Spaulings, Mike Kelley, Franz West, and Michelangelo Pistoletto.

His collection began taking shape in 2002, when Riva included photographs by Helmut Newton and Thomas Ruff; he sold the works and the profits from selling were reinvested in drawings by artists, which were less appreciated at the time, it led to the creation of an art investment fund.

In 2009, he opened the Charles Riva Collection in Brussels, where he displayed a selection of artworks from his private collection to the public on a rotating basis. The Charles Riva Collection is primarily focused on American artists due to Riva's connection to the art scene in New York City, where he had lived since he was 19.

Over the years, he exhibited featuring works by artists such as Paul McCarthy, Richard Prince, and Christopher Wool.

In addition to the Charles Riva Collection, he established the Riva Project in Brussels, a space dedicated to contemporary sculpture.

Riva served as the executive producer for all albums by the French electronic music producer Guillaume Atlan, professionally known as The Supermen Lovers, including the single Starlight. He was also served an investor in Atlan's projects.; from 2000 until 2014, Riva was the cofounder of the Ring music publishing company with Guillaume Atlan .

== Gallery ==
In 2008, Riva decided to shift from the gallery model and he began to focus on his own Collection. His Collection is housed in Brussels in a large modern Townhouse designed by Marc Corbiau. Riva's collection have had 30 exhibitions with 96 artists, mostly in Brussels.

His Collection has an exhibition history, starting with its first verified exhibition titled Jim Lambie: Selected Works 1999-2006 in Brussels back in 2008. His most recent exhibition, Intersection, held in Brussels in 2023, showcased art by artists such as Georg Baselitz, Jonathan Meese, Daniel Richter, and Paul McCarthy.

== Exhibitions ==
Since 2009, four times a year, Riva has conducted exhibitions in his residence in Brussels to the public, which he opens to the public by invitation, and where he has showcased works from his collection.

His exhibitions often delve into tension-charged themes, exploring complex issues. His exhibition titled The Power and the Glory, held in 2016, tackled the political landscape of power in anticipation of the impending American presidency.

In 2019, his exhibition Sun Women, curated by Jérôme Neutres, showcases female artists like Louise Bourgeois and Lee Krasner, dealing with gender categorization of female artists. In 2022, Riva presented ENTRE CHIEN ET LOUP, a conversation with Paulin, Paulin, and Paulin, the exhibition combined works by Francis Bacon, Alexander Calder, George Condo, Philip Guston, Paul McCarthy, and Ed Ruscha alongside furniture designed by Pierre Paulin.

In April 2022, Riva partnered with Parisian gallerist François Laffanour to present the exhibition LEVEL; including modern and contemporary design alongside contemporary art.

Riva held two exhibitions in March and April in Paris and Brussels, featuring works by Jean Prouvé, Pierre Jeanneret, and modern American artists Paul McCarthy and Richard Prince.

In 2024, Riva collaborated with Steve Wynn's artistic enterprise Wynn Fine Art located in Palm Beach, Florida.

He organised a public exhibition at Aktion Art titled Sans Titre. Anchored by works from both the Wynn Fine Art Collection and the Charles Riva Collection, the show featured artists such as Andy Warhol, Keith Haring, Sherrie Levine, Ed Ruscha, Robert Motherwell, Richard Prince, and George Condo.

== Personal life ==
Riva has two children Amelia and Vladimir Riva .

== See also ==
- José María Cano
