= Centner Academy =

Private K–8 school in Miami, Florida

Centner Academy, incorporated in 2018 and taking students for the first time in 2019, is a private school for pre-Kindergarten to eighth grades with a total of about 300 students and about 75 employees in Miami, Florida. The main elementary school campus is in the Design District, while the preschool is in Buena Vista. The school is known for its anti-vaccination stance.

== History ==
It was co-founded by David and Leila Centner, who were unhappy with the other schools in the area. Leila Centner is the former Chief Financial Officer of the Highway Toll Administration. She has worked for Arthur Andersen and Deloitte & Touche.

In August 2019 it had acquired the former Aspira Arts Charter School, made up of two buildings west of Edgewater, which it intends to use as a high school facility. On January 1, 2020, it bought Metropolitan International School in Wynwood. The merger was effective that year. The elementary school is housed in the former Metropolitan International School. Centner Academy also bought Buena Vista area houses that are to be used as residences for instructors.

== Controversy ==
In 2021 the school hosted multiple presentations for students by anti-vax conspiracy theorists.

In April 2021, Centner banned teachers who received COVID-19 vaccines from contacting students, citing scientifically false claims about potential harm to nearby people who had not received the vaccine. Teachers who had previously received vaccines to protect themselves against COVID-19, or who got the vaccine later in the year, would be removed from the classroom and not allowed to have contact with students. Centner had criticized vaccinated employees during a Zoom call. She also stated that vaccinated teachers would not be hired for the following school year and that employees would have to disclose their vaccination status to the school if they had previously received or were planning to get vaccinated during the 2020–2021 school year. In October 2021, the administration stated that students taking COVID-19 vaccines would have to quarantine for 30 days after each dose, due to the unsubstantiated claim of “vaccine shedding” infecting unvaccinated students.

== See also ==
- COVID-19 pandemic in Florida
- COVID-19 misinformation
- List of topics characterized as pseudoscience
