= Luna (opera) =

1998 opera by José María Cano

Luna a 1998 opera by the pop musician José María Cano, a former member of the pop music group Mecano. It was performed in concert version in 1998 at the Palau de la Música de València in Valencia.

== Recording ==
- Luna – excerpts Canciones, Romanzas Y Danzas – María Pagés (dancer, castanets, singer), Ainhoa Arteta (soprano), Renée Fleming (soprano), Teresa Berganza (mezzo-soprano), Plácido Domingo (tenor), Joan Albert Amargós (conductor/piano), Skaila Kanga (harp), Anthony Pleth (cello), Gerardo Núñez (guitar), Don César Sánchez (conductor/piano). Reissue 2018, 41 minutes
