= Design Miami =

International design fair

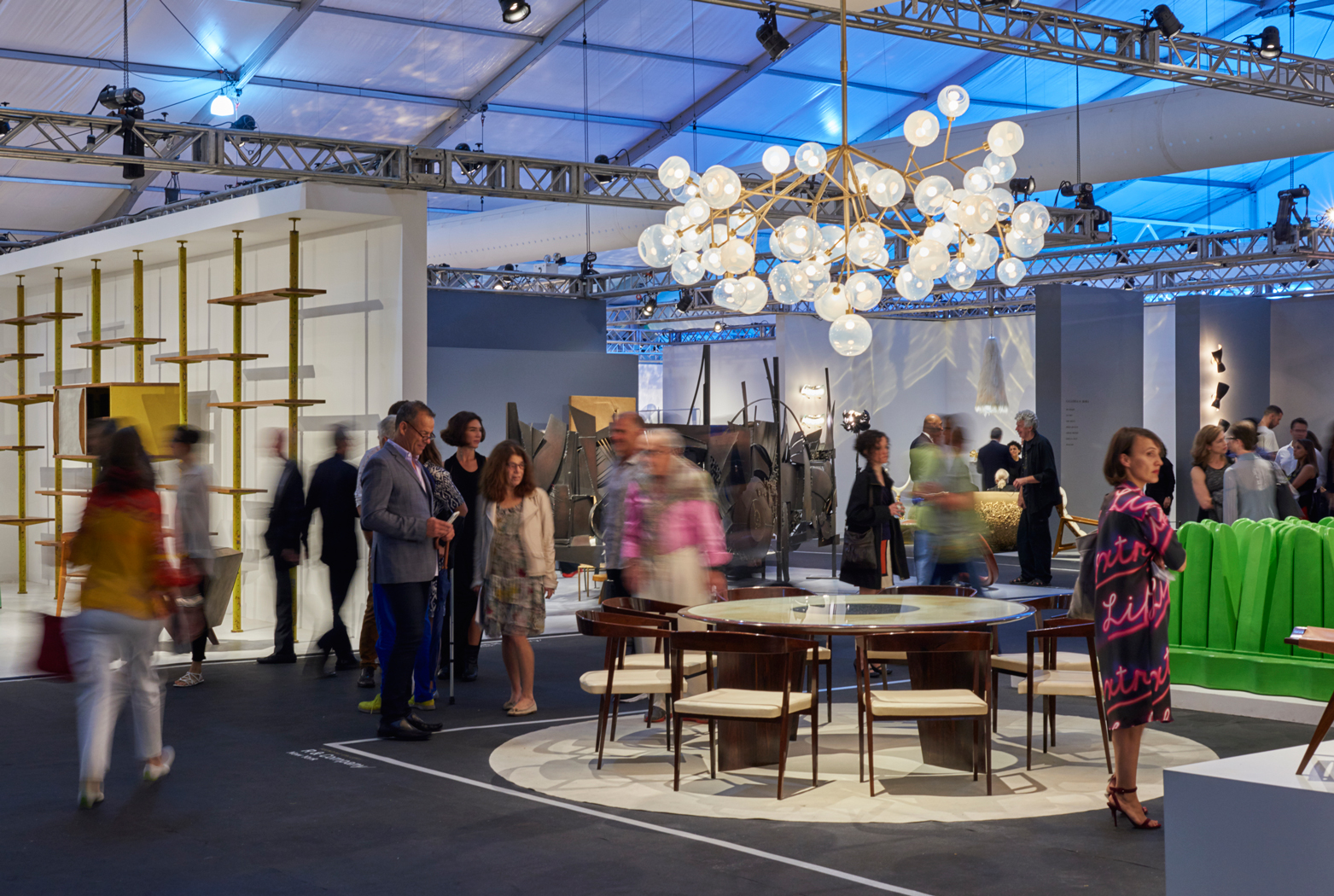
- Design Miami/ 2015 in Miami, Florida
- Genre: Design show : exhibitions and competitions
- Frequency: Annually
- Locations: Miami, United States; Paris, France
- Founder: Craig Robins, Ambra Medda
- Participants: International designers, gallerists, and collectors
- Attendance: 28,000
- Website: designmiami.com

Design Miami is an American design company that holds two annual flagship collectible design fairs in Miami, Florida each December and Paris, France each October. The fairs feature selling-exhibitions as well as speaker panels, gallery presentations, awards, and unique design commissions. Each edition offers museum-level furniture, lighting, and design objects from the 20th and 21st centuries, sourced from meticulously vetted galleries, and features immersive brand collaborations that highlight cutting-edge creative practice.

Design Miami/ fairs attract designers, gallerists, museum curators, critics, celebrities and collectors from all over the world. The landmark Design Miami/ 20th anniversary Miami Beach edition, which took place from Dec 2–7, 2025, featured over 80 exhibitors.

Alongside the fairs Design Miami/ operates an ecommerce platform that facilitates the promotion and sale of historic and contemporary design works in addition to major brand collaborations and product launches. The Design Miami/ website is also host to Forum Magazine, a digital design-centric editorial publication.

Design Miami/ was founded in 2005 by entrepreneur, real estate developer, and art and design collector Craig Robins. In 2000, Robins began working to transform the previously-abandoned Miami Design District into a center for innovative design, architecture, fashion, food and art. By 2005 the renewal of the Miami Design District inspired the creation of the Design Miami/ company and annual fair, shortly followed by Design Miami/ Basel, an annual design fair in Basel, Switzerland.

On October 18, 2023, Basic.Space acquired Design Miami/ in an all-stock transaction. Basic.Space's founder and CEO, Jesse Lee, became chairman of the Design Miami/ board, while the then-CEO, Jennifer Roberts, remained on as CEO. The aim of the acquisition was to combine Basic.Space's digital reach and curated-market experience with Design Miami/'s established global platform of galleries, designers, and luxury brands to expand the reach of collectible design and evolve the fair's format. The acquisition was announced in tandem with the first edition of Design Miami/Paris, indicating a pivot towards more international, globally expansive operations.

The inaugural Paris edition of Design Miami/ launched in 2023, followed by Design Miami.LA in May 2024, marking the first West Coast version of the fair. In 2025, Design Miami/ launched a new "In Situ" initiative — a series designed to offer regionalized experiences that celebrate and cultivate local design communities. The first "In Situ" activation was on July 31, 2025 in Aspen, Colorado, followed by Seoul, Korea in September 2025.
