= David Grutman =

American businessman (1974)

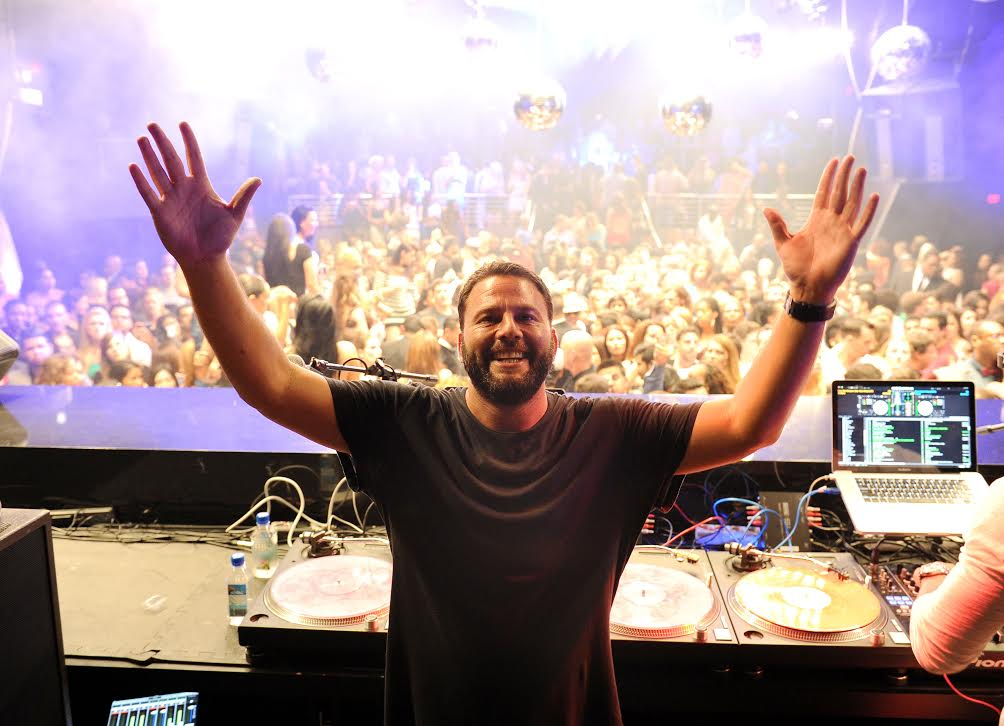
- Grutman at LIV Miami, 2012
- Born: July 3, 1974 (age 52); Naples, Florida, U.S.
- Occupation: Hospitality Entrepreneur
- Spouse: Isabela Rangel (m. 2016)
- Children: 2

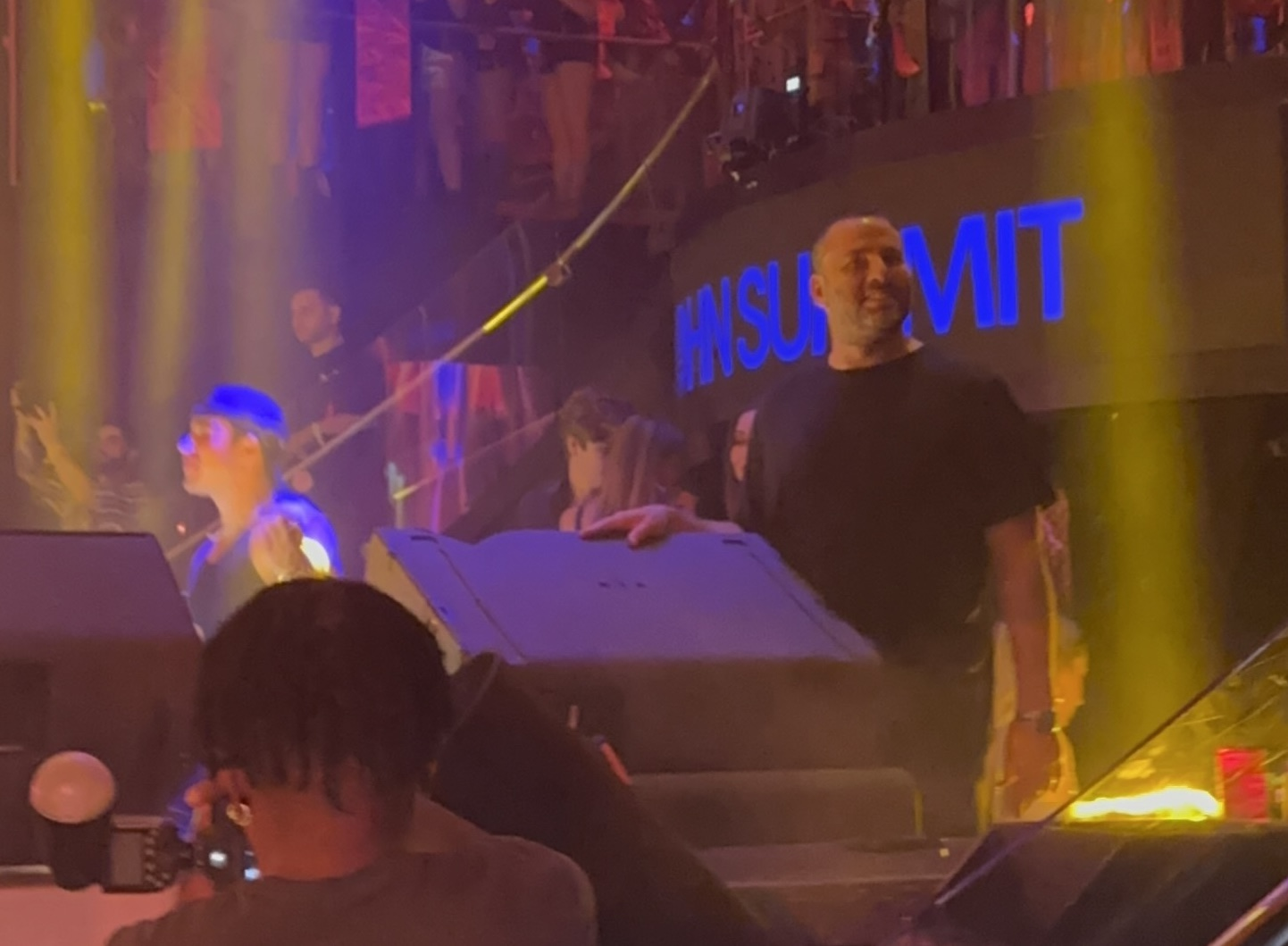
Grutman with John Summit at LIV Miami in 2025

David Grutman is an owner and partner in several Miami-based restaurants and night clubs. Rolling Stone magazine has listed Grutman as one of the 50 most important people in electronic dance music.

== Personal life ==
David was born and raised in Naples, Florida, to a Jewish family. He graduated from Barron G. Collier High School in 1993, and holds a degree in finance from the University of Florida. He married Isabela Rangel in 2016.

== Career ==
Grutman opened the nightclub LIV at the Fontainebleau Miami Beach hotel in 2008, and it was the fifth highest grossing nightclub in the United States in 2014. Grutman subsequently opened the club Story in 2013, followed by the restaurant Komodo, the café OTL, the restaurant Planta South Beach, and the Swan and Bar Bevy, in which Pharrell is also a partner.

In 2018, Grutman founded Groot Hospitality as a holding company for his ventures. In 2019, he sold a majority stake in the company to Live Nation Entertainment.

== Bibliography ==
- Grutman, David (2026). Take It Personal: how to succeed by building relationships, trusting your gut, and playing the long game. New York: Zando. ISBN 978-1-63893-349-6.
