= Wang Huangsheng =

Professor at China Central Academy of Fine Arts

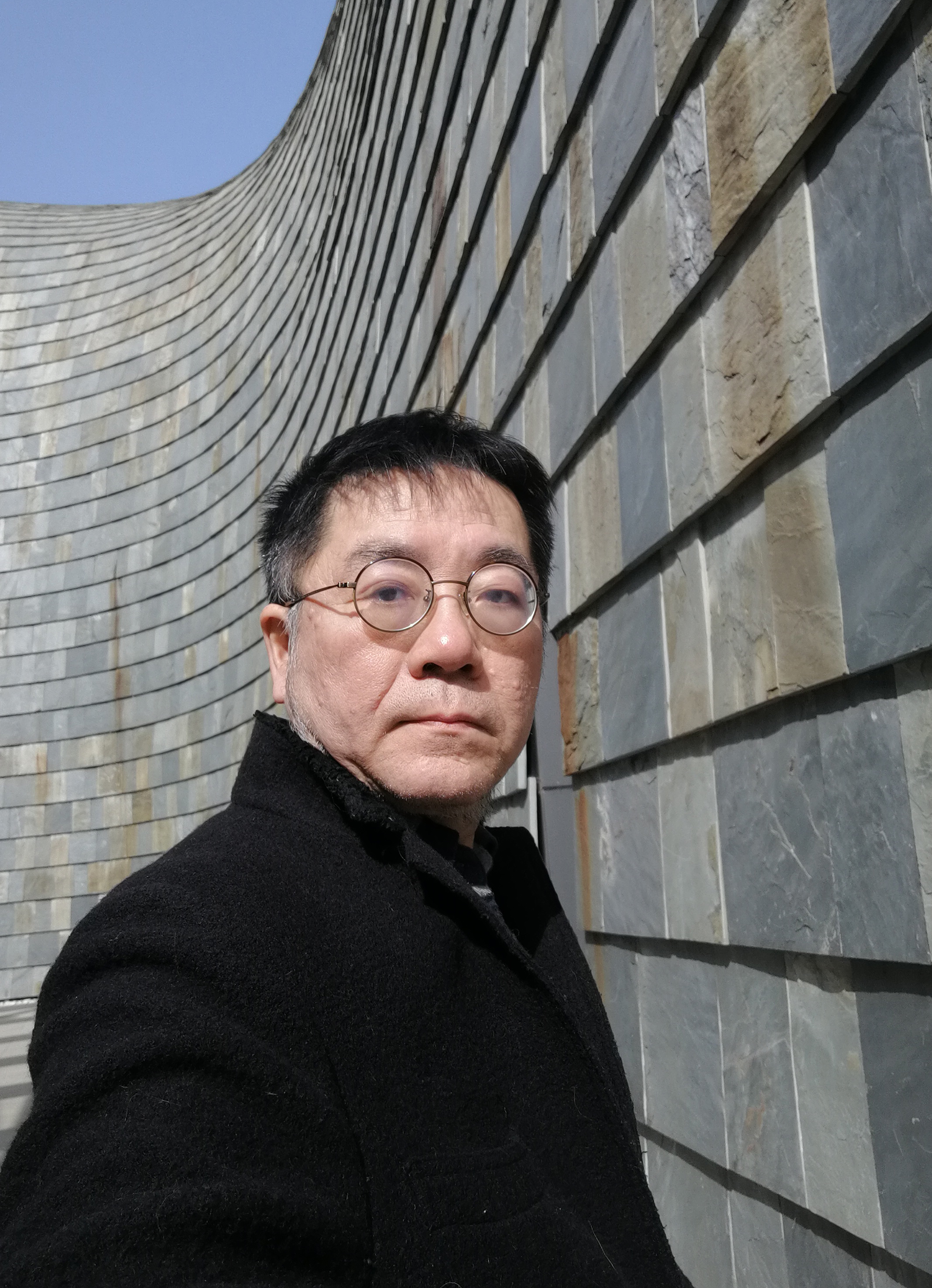
- Born: 1956 (age 69–70); Shantou, China
- Education: Art History
- Known for: Curator, Installation art
- Notable work: Guangzhou Triennial Art Exhibition

Wang Huangsheng (Chinese: 王璜生) is a Chinese-born curator, educator and artist who is currently residing in Beijing. He used to serve as the director of China Central Academy of Fine Arts Museum for eight years. As a curator, he is most known for events. He was previously director of Guangdong Museum of Art and is currently director of the art museum at the Central Academy of Fine Arts in Beijing.

== Biography ==
Wang Huangsheng was born in Shantou, Guangdong province, in 1956. Ph.D of art history, professor of China Central Academy of Fine Arts, doctoral adviser, deputy director of the Committee of Art Museums in China, Expert Committee member of National Contemporary Art Research Centre, Ministry of Culture. Wang is an art expert who enjoys special allowance of the State Council in China, also a specially-appointed professor in Heidelberg University, Guangzhou Academy of Fine Arts, Nanjing University of the Arts and South China Normal University. Wang Huangsheng obtained his master from the Nanjing University of the Arts in 1990 and his doctorate in 2006 respectively. He was the director of Guangdong Museum of Art from 2000 to 2009, the director of CAFA Art Museum from 2009 to 2017. He founded and organized the Guangzhou Triennial, Guangzhou Photo Biennale, "CAFAM Biennale", "CAFAM · Future" exhibition and Beijing Photo Biennale. Exhibitions curated include Documentary Exhibition of Art in Mao Zedong’s Era (1942–1976), The Humanism in China: A Contemporary Record of Photography, etc.

In 2004 he obtained the "Knight Medal of Art and Literature" awarded by the French government. In 2006 he obtained the "Knight Medal" awarded by the President of Italy. In 2013 he obtained the "Beijing Best Educator" award from the Beijing government.

== Paintings ==
=== Universe and Serene series ===
The Universe series combines elements of classical tradition with modern lyrical expression. The series reflects themes related to Chinese culture and the artist's interpretation of the relationship between tradition and contemporary artistic expression.

Wang Huangsheng's Serene belongs to his Flower series that is born of his pursuit of “freedom”. The “flowers” are given expression in different forms, like colors, details-adding techniques, water streaks, ink flavor, lines, taste, etc. In this sense, the form, tangible or concrete, becomes less important, and the artist's feeling and understanding about life and glory get highlighted.

=== Moving Visions series and Lines Visions series ===
After 2010, Wang shifted to more abstract practice. His Moving Visions series and Lines Visions series re-abstract the already abstract “line” and “stroke” and bring them into interaction with contemporary visual cognition in similar conditions. Moving Visions series stresses the concept of “cultivation” in traditional Chinese culture and aims to build a passage that connects contemporary culture with human being's ultimate goal. “cultivation” involves culture, moral character, artistic conception and skills, not excluding control and self-control; while “freedom” refers to non-interference, being unrestrained and uninhibited, and more importantly, accomplishment of spiritual freedom from any restraint. Between the two seemingly contradictory extremes there is probably the tension and significance of life, work and art.

The Lines Visions series is an attempt for Wang Huangsheng to think about the ink creation and social intervention. The series were drawn on newspaper media of Southern Weekly and Reference News to reflect on the current social situation.

=== Trace Vision, The Wall and Metaphor Vision series ===
In painting series Trace Vision, Metaphor Vision and The Wall, Wang experiments with gauze, bandages and rubbing. The residue left by the gauze and the ink, as well as the reality and cultural information between the newspaper and the rice paper, serves as a metaphor for harm and protection, restoration and sublimation. The detailed imprints form a contrast with the lines, shapes, and ink stains.

The Wall features a visible or invisible wall of gauze imprints of isolation and self-protection to imply injury, pain, separation, blood, care, and cure. The texture of gauze rubbing and the shades and humidity of ink echo the delicate and fine rubbing traces on a large-size tableau, also including the imprints of randomly scattered gauze bits, so as to give embodied expression on the visual and psychological levels.

Metaphor Vision, a new series in 2017, is a rubbing on gauze painted red. There are also biblical quotes about human self-reflection to express a complex feeling of harm and atonement.

== Installation ==
Wang's installations are derivative of his paintings. These installations often use barbed wires to imitate the movement of ink lines.

Overflowing Light builds an “overflowing” scene with glittering, transparent glass tube and shining barbed wires, as well as light and shadow. Sharp wires are pressed through the fragile glass tube, leaving shards scattered on the ground. The shards are beautiful but appear dangerous from close by, and are intended as a metaphor of the tension of life and reality.

Division of Space builds an enclosed space with curtains in which the barbed wires, glinting in the light, create a poetic atmosphere of ink painting, both imaginary and real.

The installation Haunts1 was made site specifically for the exhibition The Garden of Mystery: Wang Huangsheng Art Works in Suzhou Museum. The artist used barbed wire and gauze as media representing the healing of a wound, with gauze wrapping around the wire.

Haunts 2 continues to make use of barbed wires wrapped in gauze for a sense of trauma. The artists aims to lend more extensive social significance to the interaction between the property of material and human beings.

Talk About Shadows is a multi-screen video installation Talk About Shadows was completed in Palace of Prince Zhong in the museum of Suzhou in 2015. The work was created for the specified historical space of the Palace of Prince Zhong. The artist did not make a direct comment on the history of Li Xiucheng as Prince Zhong but turned the pages of fictitious text of the self-description of Li Xiucheng in the video of Talk About Shadows. The images of the multiple videos appeared across the wall ceilings in the space filled with old furniture, just like the history shadows overlapped with virtual souls, telling the heroic, complex and forgotten story. The conflict of human nature, the contradictions between ideals and survival desires, and the transformation between history and present living conditions all have been concentrated in the maze. In 2016, the work was selected for The Exhibition of Annual of Contemporary Art of China (2015). The work was then remade and displayed in Beijing Minsheng Art Museum. In the space, the artist applied tons of glass and mirror fragments to create an expression about the unique features of the history, such as blurred, broken, positive and negative, fiction and fact.

As is elaborated on by Wu Hong, an expert on art history and curator, "Boundaries are everywhere, both visible and invisible, between here and there, now and then, reality and aspirations, safety and adventure." In Wang Huangsheng's art, lines have been gradually transformed from a primary language for the two-dimensional world into part of the methodology in installation with 'spatial intensity', redefined space, and extended to be a metaphor of the historical memory and reality in universal experience. The border between the visual world and the perceptual world is thus blurred to give new room to artistic expression.

== Collection ==
Victoria and Albert Museum (U.K.), British Museum (U.K.), Ashmolean Museum (U.K.), Uffizi Gallery (Italy), Mantova Museum (Italy), Hoffmann Collection (Germany), National Art Museum of China (China), Art Museum of China Central Academy of Fine Arts (China), Art Museum of Nanjing University of the Arts (China), Guangdong Museum of Art (China), Zhejiang Art Museum (China), Hubei Museum of Art (China), Guangdong Provincial Museum (China), Anhui Provincial Museum (China), Suzhou Museum (China), Lingnan Museum of Fine Art (China).

== Exhibitions ==
=== Selected solo exhibitions ===
2022:Wang Huangsheng：Remoteness and River(He Xiangning Art Museum, Shenzhen, China); Wang Huangsheng：Tracing back to the Source of Zhujiang touring exhibition 1984/2020 Guangzhou Station(Guangzhou Library, Guangzhou, China);

2021:Wang Huangsheng：Tracing back to the Source of Zhujiang touring exhibition 1984/2020 Guizhou Station(Guizhou Art Museum, Guiyang, China);

2020:Wang Huangsheng: Breathe In/Out (Long Museum West Bund, Shanghai, China); Wang Huangsheng：Tracing back to the Source of Zhujiang touring exhibition 1984/2020 Guilin Station (Guangxi Normal University Press Art Museum, Guilin, China);

2018: Wang Huangsheng: Boungary/Space (Guangdong Museum of Art, Guangzhou, China);

2017:Wang Huangsheng: Boungary/Space (Minsheng Art Museum, Beijing, China);

2015:The Garden of Mystery: Wang Huangsheng Art Exhibition (Suzhou Museum, Suzhou, China); Wang Huangsheng: Roaming | Apparition (Lin & Lin Gallery, Taipei, China); Flux: Wang Huangsheng (Pearl Lam Galleries, Shanghai, China); Wang Huangsheng: Unbroken Line (October Gallery, London, Uk); Blade & Line: Wang Huangsheng New Ink Artworks (CAFA International Gallery, Beijing, China);

2014: On the Run: Wang Huangsheng Solo Exhibition (Redtory Museum of Contemporary Art, Guangzhou, China); Roming on the Edges: Wang Huangsheng Works (The Art Museum of Nanjing University of the Arts, Nanjing, China);

2013: The Lines to Freedom (Schiller Gallery, Heidelberg, Germany); Boundless: Wang Huangsheng’s Works (2009–2013) (Zhejiang Art Museum, Hangzhou/Hubei Museum of Art, Wuhan, China); Roaming | Apparition (WiE KULTUR, Berlin, Germany); Wang Huangsheng: Look into the Distance (Sunshine Space, Shantou, China);

2012: Post · Refined · Joy -- Art Exhibition of Wang Huangsheng (Baiyaxuan 798 Art Center, Beijing, China); 2007: Heaven and Earth · Carefree -- Wang Huangsheng Ink Painting Exhibition (Guangdong Museum of Art, Guangzhou, China);

2006: Heaven and Earth · Carefree -- Wang Huangsheng Ink Painting Exhibition (National Art Museum of China, Beijing, China); Growth in Spring/Stillness in Autumn -- Wang Huangsheng Art Works Exhibition (The University of New South Wales, Australia), etc.

=== Selected group exhibitions ===
2021:The Logic of Painting: China Central Academy of Fine Arts Faculty Works Exhibition(Xinjiang Art Museum, Wulumuqi, China); Round&Develop: Academic Invitation Exhibition of Comprehensive Material Painting(CAFA Art Museum, Beijing, China); Interspace (Block14 Level1 CAFA, Beijing, China)；

2020:Harmo-Power the First Jinan International Biennale (Shandong Art Museum, Jinan, China)；

2018:2018 Invitational Exhibition of Chinese Contemporary Artists (Aimer Museum, Beijing, China)；

2017: A Fine Line (ART100 New York, New York, U.S.); Annual Review of China Contemporary Ink Painting 2016–2017 (Ucity Art Museum of GAFA, Guangzhou, China)；

2016: The Exhibition of Annual of Contemporary Art of China, 2015 (Beijing Minsheng Art Museum, Beijing, China)；

2015: The Civil Power (Beijing Minsheng Art Museum, Beijing, China); CHINA 8: Chinese contemporary art in Rhine ruhr (Rhine ruhr, Germany); Calligraphic time and space: Abstract Art in China (Power Station of Art, Shanghai, China)；

2014: Rendering the Future -- Chinese Contemporary Ink Painting Exhibition (Asia Art Center, Beijing, China); DAJIA · Chinese Painting Biennial of Contemporary Lingnan · 2014 (Poly Art Museum, Beijing, China); Spiritual as Mountains (Pearl Lam Galleries, Hong Kong, China); Confronting Anitya -- Oriental Experience in Contemporary Art (Fred Villa Art Center, Bonn, Germany / Yuan art museum, Beijing, China)；

2013: Confronting Anitya -- Oriental Experience in Contemporary Art (Palazzo Michiel Palace, Venice/ MAGI’900 Museum, Bologna, Italy); The Taste of Ink (Amy Li Gallery, Beijing, China)；

2012: Original Forms of Chinese Water Ink Painting (Sanchuan Modern Art Museum, Nanjing/Tianjin Art Museum, China); Visionary: Contemporary Fine Art from China Central Academy of Fine Arts (Wimbledon College of Art, Art@GoldenSquare, London, England / CAFA Art Museum, Beijing, China); 4th Taipei International Modern Ink Painting Biennial (Taichung Cultural & Creative Industries Park International Exhibition Hall, CKS Memorial Hall Taipei, Taiwan, China); Not Only Paper· China -- Japan Paper Art Exhibition First Round (CAFA Art Museum, Beijing, China)；

2010: The Enduring Art of China (Montclair State University Gallery, Montclair, United States)；

From 1994 to 2009, Wang Huangsheng's paintings were selected for The 8th, 9th and 11th National Art Exhibition in China

== Curated exhibitions ==
=== Museum director and curator ===
Organized and Curated 2005 Guang Zhou Photo Biennial (Guangzhou, China), Humanism in China ----A Contemporary Record of Photography (Guangzhou, China); The first International Art Biennale(Beijing, China, 2003–2004), Fu Luofei Sketches about the People(Beijing, China); 2008 China: 20 Years of Ink Experiment(Guangzhou, China); Individual and Society in Art(Guangzhou, China); 1998 Southern context -The first invitational exhibition of the contemporary Chinese Artists(Mantua, Italy), Urban Impression A Collection of Contemporary Experimental Ink wash Drawings (Guangzhou, China), A Dialogue with Henry Moore Exhibition of Contemporary Chinese Sculpture; 1997 Concern To Reality and Transformation of Art Language ---The Specialized Collection of The China Fine Arts of the Early 20s’ ( Guangzhou, China) etc.

=== Director of China Central Academy of Fine Arts from 2009 to 2017 ===
In the eight years of working as a museum director, Wang Huangsheng planned many important exhibition, include: Social Sculpture: Beuys in China, The 3rd CAFAM Biennial Negotiating Space: I Never Thought You Were Like That, The Second CAFAM Biennale: Curating as Gesture, Super-Organism CAFAM Biennale, etc. Wang Huangsheng made great effort in aspects of art curatorial methodology, for example, the fieldwork-nominated curatorial method is applied in two future exhibitions of CAFAM, the innovative model used by the third & second CAFAM Biennial, etc. The museum also focus on the research of the relationship between the history of art and reality, for example, a series of academic activities and research on collections of “National Beiping Art School – CAFA”, the discovery, proof and research on Li Shutong's oil painting, research and exhibitions of the collections in the “young age of fine arts in new China”, etc., enriching and deepening the history and collections of CAFA, as well as research on the history of Chinese contemporary art.

== Publications ==
New Art Museum:Concept, Strategy & Practice (Guangxi Normal University Press, 2023）；

Wang Huangsheng:Tracing back to the Source of Zhujiang 1984（Guangxi Normal University Press, 2020）；

Wang Huangsheng: Boungary/Space (Hebei Education Press, 2018)；

Wang Huangsheng: The Garden of Mystery (Central Compilation & Translation Press, 2017)；

Boundless: Wang Huangsheng’s Works 2009–2013 (China Youth Publishing Group, 2013)；

Wang Huangsheng: New Experience on Art Museum, No.1 of the Art Museum as Knowledge Production series (Central Compilation & Translation Press, 2012)；

A History of Traditional Chinese Painting: Section of Landscape Painting (One of the Authors; Jiangxi Art Publishing House, 2008)；

Series of Research regarding Chinese Master painters in Ming and Qing Dynasties: Chen Hongshuo (Jilin Art Publishing House, 1995)；

los·ge·löst (WiE KULTUR, 2013)；

Post · Refined · Joy: Wang Huangsheng’s World of Art (Hebei Education Press, 2012)；

Heaven and Earth · Carefree: Paintings by Wang Huangsheng (Lingnan Art Publishing House, 2006)；

Wang Huangsheng: Heaven and Earth · Carefree (Liaoning Art Publishing House, 1996)

== Editor-in-chief ==
Museum (Tongji University Press)；

University and Art Museum (Tongji University Press)；

New Art Museum Studies Issue No.1 (Guangxi Normal University Press）
