= Craig Robins =

US businessman, investor, philanthropist

- Born: Craig Lewis Robins; February 15, 1963 (age 63); Miami Beach, Florida, U.S.
- Education: B.A. University of Michigan (1984); J.D. University of Miami School of Law (1987)
- Occupations: Founder and CEO of Dacra Development; Co-founder and co-owner of Design Miami
- Known for: Developer of South Beach in the '90s and '00s Developer of the Miami Design District; Founder and Owner of Design Miami
- Spouse: Jackie Soffer

Craig Lewis Robins (born February 15, 1963) is an American businessman, investor, and philanthropist. He is the founder and CEO of Dacra Development, the co-founder and co-owner of Design Miami and developer of the Miami Design District.

== Early life and education ==
Robins was born into a Jewish family in Miami Beach, Florida. His father, Gerald Robins, was a successful Miami Beach real estate developer who moved to Florida from New York City in the 1950s. He has a sister, named Gina. In 1972, his parents divorced and his father remarried to Joan Benjamin who had two children from a previous marriage: Scott (born 1963) and Stacy (born 1965). Robins was greatly influenced by his father who worked extensively in Miami Beach and raised Craig and his three siblings on Star Island.

Robins attended the University of Barcelona in 1982 and credits his time as a student in Spain for inspiring his passion for art, design and architecture. He went on to earn a Bachelor of Arts degree from the University of Michigan in 1984 and graduated from the University of Miami School of Law in 1987.

== Career ==
In 1986, he was approached by New York real estate developers Tony Goldman and Mark Soyka who wanted to renovate the storied but run-down Park Central Hotel on Ocean Drive in Miami Beach. Robins represented his father at the meeting which devolved into a discussion about renovating South Beach. (Robins states that Goldman was "the second big influence on my career, after my father.") In 1987, Robins branching out on his own, formed Dacra Development, Inc. and started to purchase and develop South Beach real estate. In 1988, he formed Dacra Construction and his brother Scott also got into real estate forming a separate company, Scott Robins Companies, Inc. which partnered with Craig's company. Robins brokered a compromise between developers and preservationists over expanding Miami Beach's Art Deco Historic District which helped establish his reputation as a preservationist. In the early years of his career, Robins was mentored by his then-business partner Chris Blackwell, founder of Island Records. Together, they renovated a number of properties on South Beach which were repositioned as Island Outpost hotels. Those properties included the Netherland, the Leslie, the Kent, the Cavalier and the Marlin, which was widely credited as igniting the renaissance of the area. In 1992, they purchased with their father for $8.5 million the Cavalier, the Cardozo, the Carlyle, the Leslie, and the Victor hotels from the creditors of developer Leonard Pelullo. Robins’ next important mentor was real estate developer Tony Goldman, who was largely credited for the revitalization of NYC’s Soho. In 1997, Robins bought Chalk's Airlines and renamed it Pan Am Air Bridge; he sold it in 1998. In 1999, Dacra acquired 8.5 acres on the southern tip of Allison Island and created AQUA, a New Urbanist community featuring modern architecture, design and site-specific public art. The private residential community of 46 homes on Allison Island designed by ten different architecture firms with a master plan by Duany Plater-Zyberk and public art projects including a 100-foot mural by Richard Tuttle. It is now an international model for development. Thereafter, Robins focused on reviving Miami’s Design District. In 2005, Robins launched the first Design Miami collectible design fair in the Design District alongside Art Basel. A global forum for design, each fair brings together influential collectors, gallerists, designers, curators and critics to celebrate design culture and commerce. Occurring alongside the Art Basel fairs in Miami, USA each December and Basel, Switzerland each June, Design Miami/ has become the premier venue for collecting, exhibiting, discussing and creating collectible design. The Miami Design District is now evolving into a luxury shopping center with offerings including Louis Vuitton, Hermès, and Cartier. In 2012, the District became the only project in Miami Dade county to receive LEED Gold Neighborhood Development certification.

== Art collection ==
Studying abroad in Barcelona prompted Robins first art acquisition, a piece by Salvador Dalí. Currently, he has built a collection of over 1,000 objects, a selection of artworks are on public display at the Dacra headquarters and are rotated annually. Exhibits at Dacra often feature works by artists John Baldessari, Richard Tuttle, Kai Althoff, Rirkrit Tiravanija and Nicole Eisenman.

An extension of the art collection can be found in Robins development projects. Artist Richard Tuttle received his first public art commission from Robins for the Aqua at Allison Island project. Additional public art pieces at Aqua include “Aquarelle” by Guillermo Kuitca and “Freebird” by Mark Handforth, both of whom have works in the collection. Robins also loaned a selection of two-dimensional works from his personal collection to various sites at Aqua. In the Miami Design District, John Baldessari was asked by Robins to create two murals for City View Garage and a mural by artist Gabriel Orozco covers two-walls at the entrance to the office suites at Dacra.

== Awards ==
Robins is frequently listed among the top collectors of contemporary art and design. He has received numerous awards for his leadership and philanthropy including:

- 2006 Design Patron Award from the Cooper Hewitt, Smithsonian Design Museum. Presented to Robins at the White House by the First Lady, the award recognizes an individual’s patronage of design within the business and civic sectors.
- 2011 Montblanc de la Culture Arts Patronage Award. Selected by an international jury, the award honors exemplary patrons of art, architecture, design and culture in civic, institutional, educational and commercial contexts. Robins was selected for being at the forefront of Miami’s cultural and architectural resurgence, through diverse projects instrumental in improving the lives of the city’s residents over more than 25 years.
- 2016 Creative Times Annual Gala Honoree for “bridging the division between public and private” through his patronage of the arts and leadership in developing the Miami Design District and Design Miami.

== Civic leadership and philanthropy ==
Robins serves on the board of trustees of the Perez Art Museum Miami (PAMM), where in 2013, Robins and wife Jackie Soffer donated more than 200 works of art from their private collection.

He is a co-founder and active patron of the Institute of Contemporary Art, Miami (ICA).

A long-time advocate of community development, design and architecture, Robins serves on the advisory board of the University of Miami School of Architecture Master in Real Estate Development and Urbanism.

Robins serves on the board of governors for the Sylvester Comprehensive Cancer Center at the University of Miami.

== Personal life ==
Robins is married to Jackie Soffer, co-owner of Turnberry Associates who oversees Aventura Mall and is the daughter of real estate developer Donald Soffer.
