= OCESA =

Mexican concert promoter (e. 1990)

- Formerly: Operadora De Centro De Espectaculos S.A.
- Company type: Private
- Industry: Entertainment; Nightlife; Music
- Founded: 1990; 36 years ago
- Founder: Alejandro Soberon Kuri
- Headquarters: Mexico City, Mexico
- Services: Event Promotion; Concert organization
- Parent: Live Nation Entertainment
- Subsidiaries: OCESA Colombia; OCESA Seitrack; OCESA Teatro
- Website: www.ocesa.com.mx

OCESA (formerly Operadora De Centro De Espectaculos S.A.) is a Mexican concert promoter founded in 1990 by Alejandro Soberon Kuri. The company organizes concerts, music festivals, and other live events. It is currently the largest music promoter in Mexico. It is headquartered in the Hipódromo de las Américas in Mexico City, Mexico. OCESA is a subsidiary of Live Nation Entertainment and Grupo CIE.

== History ==
In 1994, Bruce Moran, president of OCESA Presents, attempted to bring more foreign artists into Mexico. As part of this initiative, the company organized shows and concert tours with artists such as Pink Floyd, Paul McCartney, Madonna and Santana. During Moran's tenure, the company also began to expand into talent management when it took over part of the operations of Ogden Entertainment Services, its majority owner at the time, and hired its personnel.

In 2019 Live Nation planned to acquire a controlling stake in OCESA for $500 million, purchasing Mexican mass media company Televisa's 40% stake. Live Nation backed out in May 2020. Televisa stated that it was considering legal options after this. However, Live Nation Entertainment resumed its acquisition on September 13, 2021

== Subsidiaries ==
OCESA's theater division is Ocesa Teatro. OCESA also owns the record label and talent agency OCESA Seitrack.
