= 2023 Premios Juventud =

2023 award ceremony

20th Premios Juventud
- Date: July 20, 2023
- Location: José Miguel Agrelot Coliseum, San Juan, Puerto Rico
- Country: United States
- Hosted by: Ángela Aguilar; Alejandra Espinoza; Dayanara Torres; Marcus Ornellas

Highlights
- Most awards: Shakira (8)
- Most nominations: Bad Bunny, Grupo Frontera, Maluma, Peso Pluma, Rauw Alejandro, Rosalía, Shakira and Tini (9)
- Website: Official page

Television/radio coverage
- Network: Univision
- Viewership: 4.4 million

The 20th Premios Juventud was held on July 20, 2023, to recognize the best in pop culture of young Hispanic and Latino Americans in 2023. The ceremony took place at the José Miguel Agrelot Coliseum in San Juan, Puerto Rico, for the second year in a row. It was broadcast live on Univision. The ceremony was hosted by Mexican singer Ángela Aguilar, Mexican TV host Alejandra Espinoza, Puerto Rican actress Dayanara Torres, and Brazilian actor Marcus Ornellas.

The nominations were announced on June 13, 2023. Bad Bunny, Grupo Frontera, Maluma, Peso Pluma, Rauw Alejandro, Rosalía, Shakira and Tini led the nominations with nine each, Becky G, Camilo, Karol G, Manuel Turizo and María Becerra followed, all with eight nominations.

Fifteen new categories were introduced, including seven urban music categories (Best Urban Track, Best Urban Mix, Best Urban Album – Male, Best Urban Album – Female, Best Dembow Song, Best Dembow Collaboration and Best Trap Song) and six pop music categories (Best Pop Track, Best Pop Mix, Best Pop Album, Best Pop/Urban Song, Best Pop/Urban Collaboration and Best Pop/Urban Album).

== Performers ==
Artist(s)	Song(s)
Pre-show
Venesti	"Necesidad" "Umaye"
Luis Figueroa	"La Luz"
Main show
Luny Tunes; Angel & Khriz; R.K.M & Ken-Y; Alexis & Fido; Chesca; Zion & Lennox; Rainao; De La Ghetto; Khea; DJ Playero; Wisin; Omar Courtz; Chencho Corleone	"Ven Bailalo" "Down" "El Tiburón" "Yo Voy" "Noche De Travesuras" "Saoco"
Fuerza Regida	"Sabor Fresa"
Danna Paola	"1Trago" "Sugar Mami"
Snow Tha Product; Chiquis	"Ni Muerta"
Farruko	"Pasa_je_ro" "Esta Vida"
Pavel Nuñez; Fernando Villalona; La Materialista; Jandy Ventura; Ilegales	"El Guardia Del Arsenal" "Dominicano Soy" "Música Latina" "Merenguero Hasta La Tambora" "El Taqui Taqui"
Ha*Ash	"Supongo Que Lo Sabes"
Chencho Corleone	"Un Cigarrillo" "Hora De Salir"
Angela Aguilar	"Piensa En Mí"
Hoobastank; Moly	"The Reason"
Camilo; Carín León	"Ni Me Debes Ni Te Debo"
Jowell & Randy; Wisin	"Baja Sube Sube"
Camila	"Fugitivos" "Mientes" "Todo Cambió"
Los Hermanos Rosario; Toño Rosario	"El Palo" "Dale Vieja Dale" "La Dueña Del Swing" "Alegría" "Rompecintura" "Cumande"
Paulina Rubio	"Propiedad Privada"
Eslabón Armado	"Ella Baila Sola"
CNCO	"La Última Canción"
Chiquis; Jacquie Rivera; Jenicka López	"Pedacito De Mí"
Khea; Tiago PZK	"Para Amarte A Ti" "Asqueroso"
Sofía Reyes; Danna Paola	"Marte" "Tqum"

== Winners and nominees ==
The nominees were announced on June 13, 2023. The winners are listed in bold.

=== General ===
Artist of the Youth – Male

- **Peso Pluma**
- Bad Bunny
- Camilo
- Carín León
- Daddy Yankee
- Manuel Turizo
- Myke Towers
- Ozuna
- Rauw Alejandro
- Romeo Santos

Artist of the Youth – Female

- **Shakira**
- Ángela Aguilar
- Anitta
- Becky G
- Camila Cabello
- Chiquis
- Karol G
- María Becerra
- Rosalía
- Tini

Favorite Group or Duo of The Year

- **Ha*Ash**
- CNCO
- Eslabon Armado
- Fuerza Regida
- Gente de Zona
- Grupo Frontera
- Jesse & Joy
- Los Ángeles Azules
- Reik
- Wisin & Yandel

The New Generation – Female

- **Kenia Os**
- Bratty
- Gale
- Jenn Morel
- La Joaqui
- Ludmilla
- Pahua
- Paopao
- Snow Tha Product
- Young Miko

The New Generation – Male

- **Bizarrap**
- Brray
- Chris Lebron
- Lasso
- Quevedo
- Rels B
- Rusherking
- Trueno
- Yng Lvcas
- Yovngchimi

Male Artist – On The Rise

- **Eladio Carrión**
- Álvaro Díaz
- Blessd
- Boza
- Carín León
- Fuerza Regida
- Luis R. Conriquez
- Ryan Castro
- Santa Fe Klan
- Tiago PZK

Female Artist – On The Rise

- **Danna Paola**
- Aitana
- Bad Gyal
- Chesca
- Emilia
- Kim Loaiza
- La Gabi
- Lola Índigo
- Tokischa
- Villano Antillano

My Favorite Streaming Artist

- **Karol G**
- Bad Bunny
- Becky G
- Bizarrap
- Carín León
- Fuerza Regida
- Grupo Frontera
- J Balvin
- Peso Pluma
- Rauw Alejandro

The Best Beatmakers

- **Bizarrap**
- DJ Luian
- Edgar Barrera
- Foreign Teck
- Mambo Kingz
- Mr. Naisgai
- Ovy on the Drums
- Sky Rompiendo
- Subelo Neo
- Tainy

Best Song By a Couple

- **"Beso" – Rosalía & Rauw Alejandro**
- "Abajito" – Lele Pons & Guaynaa
- "Dicelo" – Jay Wheeler & Zhamira Zambrano
- "La Boda" – Jessi Uribe & Paola Jara
- "Luna" – JD Pantoja & Kim Loaiza

Best Song for My Ex

- **"Shakira: Bzrp Music Sessions, Vol. 53" – Bizarrap & Shakira**
- "Cupido" – Tini
- "Mi Exxx" – Wisin & Anuel AA
- "Que Vuelvas" – Carín León & Grupo Frontera
- "Un x100to" – Grupo Frontera & Bad Bunny

OMG Collaboration

- **"Despechá RMX" – Rosalía & Cardi B**
- "A Tú Manera" – Macaco, Pedro Capó, Alvaro Soler featuring Ky-Mani Marley
- "Bailar Contigo" – Black Eyed Peas & Daddy Yankee
- "El Merengue" – Marshmello & Manuel Turizo
- "Forever My Love" – J Balvin & Ed Sheeran
- "Let's Get Crazy! (Mambo Drop)" – Don Omar & Lil Jon
- "No Más" – Murda Beatz featuring Quavo, J Balvin, Anitta & Pharrell
- "Ojalá" – The RudeBoyz, Maluma & Adam Levine
- "Sin Fin" – Romeo Santos & Justin Timberlake
- "Si Salimos" – Eladio Carrión & 50 Cent

Girl Power

- **"TQG" – Karol G & Shakira**
- "Activa" – Chesca, Villano Antillano & Corina Smith
- "Brinca" – Cazzu & Young Miko
- "Despechá RMX" – Rosalía & Cardi B
- "Hung Up on Tokischa" – Madonna & Tokischa
- "Intoxicao" – Emilia & Nicki Nicole
- "La Loto" – Tini, Becky G & Anitta
- "Lokita" – Natti Natasha & María Becerra
- "Para No Verte Más" – Thalía & Kenia Os
- "Que Agonía" – Yuridia & Ángela Aguilar

The Hottest Choreography

- **"Mayor Que Usted" – Natti Natasha, Daddy Yankee & Wisin & Yandel**
- "El Teke Teke" – Carlos Vives, Black Eyed Peas & Play-N-Skillz
- "La Loto" – Tini, Becky G & Anitta
- "Let's Get Crazy! (Mambo Drop)" – Don Omar & Lil Jon
- "Suelta" – Dímelo Flow, Rauw Alejandro, María Becerra, Farruko, Mr. Vegas & Fatman Scoop

Video with the Most Powerful Message

- **"La Reina" – Maluma**
- "5:24 – Camilo
- "Algo Bonito" – ILe & Ivy Queen
- "Montaña Solitaria" – Carlos Vives & ChocQuibTown
- "No Es Que Te Extrañe" – Christina Aguilera
- "Tierra" – Bomba Estéreo

=== Urban ===
Best Urban Track

- **"TQG" – Karol G & Shakira**
- "Café con Leche" – Pitbull
- "Deprimida" – Ozuna
- "La Bebe Remix" – Yng Lvcas & Peso Pluma
- "Necesidad" – Venesti
- "Noche De Teteo" – Sech
- "Rumbatón" – Daddy Yankee
- "Sincero" – Don Omar
- "Tití Me Preguntó" – Bad Bunny
- "Yandel 150" – Yandel & Feid

Best Urban Mix

- **"Hey Mor" – Ozuna & Feid**
- "Ande Con Quien Ande" – Myke Towers & Jhayco
- "Besos Moja2" – Wisin & Yandel & Rosalía
- "Desesperados" – Rauw Alejandro & Chencho Corleone
- "Me Porto Bonito" – Bad Bunny & Chencho Corleone
- "Nivel De Perreo" – J Balvin & Ryan Castro
- "Nos Comemos" – Tiago PZK & Ozuna
- "Nos Comemos Vivos" – Maluma & Chencho Corleone
- "Nunca Y Pico" – Yandel, Maluma & Eladio Carrión
- "Ulala" – Myke Towers & Daddy Yankee

Best Urban Album – Male

- **Un Verano Sin Ti – Bad Bunny**
- 3men2 Kbrn – Eladio Carrión
- Feliz Cumpleaños Ferxxo Te Pirateamos el Álbum – Feid
- La Última Misión – Wisin & Yandel
- La Vida Es Una – Myke Towers
- LLNM2 – Anuel AA
- Microdosis – Mora
- Ozutochi – Ozuna
- Saturno – Rauw Alejandro
- Sr. Santos – Arcángel

Best Urban Album – Female

- **Mañana Será Bonito – Karol G**
- Esquemas – Becky G
- La Nena de Argentina – María Becerra
- Nena Trampa – Cazzu
- Trap Kitty – Young Miko

Best Dembow Song

- **"To' Esto Es Tuyo" – Natti Natasha**
- "Cuca" – Kiko El Crazy
- "Feliz" – Chimbala
- "Gogo Dance" – El Alfa & Chael Produciendo
- "Me La Wa Robar" – La Materialista & Ángel Dior

Best Dembow Collaboration

- **"Delincuente" – Tokischa, Anuel AA & Ñengo Flow**
- "Le Doy 20 Mil" – El Alfa & PRINCE ROYCE
- "Pichirry" – Kiko el Crazy & El Alfa
- "Soy Mamá Remix" – La Insuperable, Farina & Yailin La Más Viral
- "Subete A Mi Moto" – Chimbala & Angel Dior
- "Wapae" – 6ix9ine, Ángel Dior and Lenier featuring Bullin 47

Best Trap Song

- **"Coco Chanel" – Eladio Carrión & Bad Bunny**
- "Baby Father 2.0" – Yovngchimi featuring Myke Towers, Arcángel, Ñengo Flow & Yeruza
- "JS4E" – Arcángel
- "La 2Blea" – Anuel AA
- "Riri" – Young Miko

=== Pop ===
Best Pop Track

- **"Bailé Con Mi Ex" – Becky G**
- "Ambulancia" – Camilo & Camila Cabello
- "Junio" – Maluma
- "La Equivocada" – CNCO
- "La Fiesta" – Pedro Capó
- "No Sé Si Salga El Sol Remix" – Manuel Medrano & Rawayana
- "Respirar" – Jesse & Joy
- "Supongo Que Lo Sabes" – Ha*Ash
- "Te Amo Y Punto" – Chayanne
- "TV" – Sebastián Yatra

Best Pop Mix

- **"Contigo" – Sebastián Yatra & Pablo Alborán**
- "A Veces Bien Y A Veces Mal" – Ricky Martin & Reik
- "Muero" – Kany García & Alejandro Sanz
- "Si Pudiera" – Vanesa Martín & Jesse & Joy
- "Una Vez Más" – Pedro Capó & Lali

Best Pop Album

- **Haashtag – Ha*Ash**
- Clichés – Jesse & Joy
- De Adentro Pa Afuera – Camilo
- El Amor Que Merecemos – Kany García
- Familia – Camila Cabello
- La Cuarta Hoja – Pablo Alborán
- La Neta – Pedro Capó
- Play – Ricky Martin
- Sincerándome – Carlos Rivera
- XOXO – CNCO

Best Pop/Urban Song

- **"Shakira: Bzrp Music Sessions, Vol. 53" – Bizarrap & Shakira**
- "Cairo" – Karol G & Ovy On The Drums
- "Chao Bebe" – Ovy on the Drums & Ozuna
- "Cupido" – Tini
- "De 100 A 0" – Manuel Turizo
- "Despechá" – Rosalía
- "Fiesta" – Farina & Ryan Castro
- "Hot" – Daddy Yankee & Pitbull
- "No Hay Ley" – Kali Uchis
- "Tuturu" – Chesca

Best Pop/Urban Collaboration

- **"TQG" – Karol G & Shakira**
- "AEIOU" – Justin Quiles & Robin Schulz
- "Éxtasis" – Manuel Turizo & María Becerra
- "Mayor Que Usted" – Natti Natasha, Daddy Yankee & Wisin & Yandel
- "Muñecas" – Tini, La Joaqui & Steve Aoki
- "Quevedo: Bzrp Music Sessions, Vol. 52" – Bizarrap & Quevedo
- "Suelta" – Dímelo Flow, Rauw Alejandro, María Becerra, Farruko, Mr. Vegas & Fatman Scoop
- "Te Felicito" – Shakira & Rauw Alejandro
- "Te Recuerdo" – Wisin, Emilia & Lyanno
- "Vacaciones" – Luis Fonsi & Manuel Turizo

Best Pop/Urban Album

- **Motomami + – Rosalía**
- 777 – Piso 21
- 2000 – Manuel Turizo
- Cupido – Tini
- Donde Quiero Estar – Quevedo
- Emociones – Jay Wheeler
- Ley De Gravedad – Luis Fonsi
- The Love & Sex Tape (Deluxe Edition) – Maluma
- Tú Crees en Mí? – Emilia
- Versions of Me – Anitta

=== Regional Mexican ===
Best Regional Mexican Song

- **"Ella Baila Sola" – Eslabon Armado & Peso Pluma**
- "Calidad" – Grupo Firme & Luis Mexia
- "Fuera De Servicio" – El Fantasma
- "Gato de Madrugada" – Joss Favela
- "La Profecía" – Los Tucanes de Tijuana
- "Lo Mejor Que Hay en Mi Vida" – La Arrolladora Banda El Limón de René Camacho
- "No Es Por Acá" – Carín León
- "No Se Va (En Vivo)" – Grupo Frontera
- "Si Me Duele Que Duela" – Intocable
- "Vivo En El 6" – Christian Nodal

Best Regional Mexican Collaboration

- **"PRC" – Peso Pluma & Natanael Cano**
- "Bebe Dame" – Fuerza Regida & Grupo Frontera
- "Hay Que Hacer Dinero" – Banda MS de Sergio Lizárraga & Edén Muñoz
- "JGL" – La Addictiva & Luis R Conriquez
- "La Bailadora" – Grupo Firme & Joss Favela
- "No Me Hablen De Amor" – Pepe Aguilar & Intocable
- "Que Agonía" – Yuridia & Ángela Aguilar
- "Que Vuelvas" – Carín León & Grupo Frontera
- "Se Acabó (En Vivo)" – Lenin Ramírez, Fuerza Regida & Banda Renovación
- "Si Ya Hiciste El Mal" – Luis R Conriquez & Jessi Uribe

Best Regional Mexican Fusion

- **"Un x100to" – Grupo Frontera & Bad Bunny**
- "Alaska" – Camilo & Grupo Firme
- "Chanel" – Becky G & Peso Pluma
- "Como El Viento" – Luis R Conriquez & Nicky Jam
- "La Siguiente" – Kany García & Christian Nodal
- "Llorar y Llorar" – Mau y Ricky & Carín León
- "Más Muerto Que Vivo" – Matisse & Intocable
- "Por El Resto De Tú Vida" – Christian Nodal & Tini
- "Tú Y Tú" – Los Ángeles Azules, Cazzu & Santa Fe Klan
- "Un Chingo De Tequila" – Banda MS de Sergio Lizárraga & Mario Domm

Best Regional Mexican Album

- **Sembrando – Peso Pluma**
- Abeja Reina – Chiquis
- Aclarando La Mente – Joss Favela
- Con Los Pies En La Tierra – Lenin Ramírez
- Consejos Gratis – Edén Muñoz
- Contingente – Junior H
- Cumbia Del Corazón – Los Ángeles Azules
- Enfiestados Y Amanecidos – Grupo Firme
- Forajido – Christian Nodal
- Pa' Luego Es Tarde – Yuridia

New Generation – Regional Mexican

- **Peso Pluma**
- Conexión Divina
- Edén Muñoz
- Grupo Frontera
- Grupo Marca Registrada
- Kevin Kaarl
- Mario Bautista
- Paola Jara
- Sebastián Esquivel
- Victor Cibrián

=== Tropical ===
Best Tropical Hit

- **"La Bachata" – Manuel Turizo**
- "Decidí Tener Pantalones" – Víctor Manuelle
- "La Fórmula" – Maluma & Marc Anthony
- "Otra Vez" – Prince Royce
- "Pegao" – Camilo
- "Peligro" – Luis Vázquez
- "Quiero Quemar La Pista" – LIMI-T 21
- "Sin Ropa" – Sie7e
- "Solo Conmigo" – Romeo Santos
- "Todavía Te Espero" – Luis Figueroa

Best Tropical Mix

- **"Monotonía" – Shakira & Ozuna**
- "Cumbia Del Corazón" – Los Ángeles Azules & Carlos Vives
- "El Merengue" – Marshmello & Manuel Turizo
- "El Pañuelo" – Romeo Santos & Rosalía
- "La Fórmula" – Maluma & Marc Anthony
- "Pan para Yolanda" – Melendi & Aymée Nuviola
- "Pasa" – Fonseca & Matisse
- "Si Te Preguntan..." – Prince Royce, Nicky Jam & Jay Wheeler
- "Soy Yo" – Don Omar, Wisin & Gente de Zona
- "Te Olvidaste De Mi" – Frank Reyes Featuring Rafa Jiménez

Best Tropical Album

- **Formula, Vol. 3 – Romeo Santos**
- 24/7 – Gusi
- Canciones Del Corazón – Olga Tañón
- Cumbiana II – Carlos Vives
- Debut Y Segunda Tanda, Vol. 1 – Gilberto Santa Rosa
- Empezando Otra Vez – Daniela Darcourt
- Limi-T Para Siempre – LIMI-T 21
- Luis Figueroa – Luis Figueroa
- Mi Muchachita – Elvis Martínez
- Pa'llá Voy – Marc Anthony

=== Digital ===
I Want More

- **Kenia Os**
- Ángela Aguilar
- Belinda
- Danna Paola
- Karely Ruiz
- Kim Loaiza
- Manelyk
- Peso Pluma
- Tammy Parra
- Tini

Couples That Blow Up My Social

- **Rosalía & Rauw Alejandro**
- Camilo & Evaluna Montaner
- Christian Nodal & Cazzu
- Danna Paola & Alex Hoyer
- Lele Pons & Guaynaa
- Kim Loaiza & JD Pantoja

Best Fandom

- **Keninis – Kenia Os**
- Beli Lovers – Belinda
- Dreamers – Danna Paola
- Jukilop – Kim Loaiza & JD Pantoja
- La Tribu – Camilo

Social Dance Challenge

- **"TQG" – Karol G & Shakira**
- "Lokita" – Natti Natasha & María Becerra
- "Malas Decisiones" – Kenia Os
- "Ting Tang Tang Tang Dance Challence" ("See Tihn") – Hoàng Thùy Linh
- "Wednesday Dance Challence" ("Bloody Mary") – Jenna Ortega

My Favorite Trendsetter

- **Bad Bunny**
- Becky G
- Danna Paola
- Emilia
- Lali
- Maluma
- María Becerra
- Ricky Montaner
- Sebastián Yatra
- Valentina Ferrer

=== Television ===
My Favorite Actor

- **Gabriel Soto – Mi camino es amarte & Soltero con hijas**
- Andrés Palacios – La madrastra
- David Zepeda – Vencer la ausencia & Mi fortuna es amarte
- José Ron – La mujer del diablo
- Marcus Ornellas – Mujer de nadie
- Matías Novoa – La herencia & Cabo

My Favorite Actress

- **Michelle Renaud – La herencia**
- Carolina Miranda – La mujer del diablo
- Claudia Martín – Los ricos también lloran
- Sandra Echeverría – María Félix: La Doña
- Susana González – Mi camino es amarte & Mi fortuna es amarte
- Yalitza Aparicio – Mujeres asesinas

They Make Me Fall In Love

- **Aracely Arámbula & Andrés Palacios – La madrastra**
- Carolina Miranda & José Ron – La mujer del diablo
- Claudia Martín & Sebastián Rulli – Los ricos también lloran
- Kate del Castillo & Maxi Iglesias – Volver a caer
- Michelle Renaud & Matías Novoa – La herencia
- Susana González & David Zepeda – Mi fortuna es amarte
