= Por Amar a Ciegas =

2008 single by Arcángel

Single by Arcángel

from the album El Fenómeno
- Released: September 2008
- Recorded: 2008
- Genre: R&B
- Length: 3:54
- Label: Machete; Mas Flow
- Songwriter(s): Norgie Noriega
- Producer(s): Luny Tunes; Tainy; Noriega

Arcángel singles chronology
"Pa' Que la Pases Bien" (2008)	"Por Amar a Ciegas" (2008)	"Agresivo 3" (2008)

"Por Amar a Ciegas" ("For Loving Blind") is the first single by the reggaeton singer Arcángel from his first compilation album El Fenómeno, released in December 2008. It was produced by Luny Tunes, Tainy and Noriega.

== Versions and remixes ==
- "Por Amar a Ciegas" (Original) – 3:54
- "Por Amar a Ciegas" (Remix) – 4:05
- "Por Amar a Ciegas" (Bachata version) – 3:33
- "Por Amar a Ciegas" (Hip-Hop version) – 3:55

== Music video ==
In the music video, Luny from the production duo makes a cameo appearance.

== Charts ==
Chart (2008)	Peak position
U.S. Hot Latin Songs (Billboard)	35
U.S. Latin Rhythm Airplay (Billboard)	6
