= Sigues Con Él =

Single by Arcángel, Sech and Dímelo Flow

from the album Historias de un Capricornio
- Language: Spanish
- English title: "Are You Still With Him"
- Released: December 13, 2019
- Genre: Reggaeton
- Length: 3:46
- Label: Rimas
- Songwriters: Austin Agustín Santos; Carlos Isaías Morales Williams
- Producers: Dímelo Flow; Jvy Boy; Keytin

Arcángel singles chronology
"Memoria Rota" (2019)	"Sigues Con Él" (2019)	"Soltería" (2020)

Sech singles chronology
"La Isla" (2019)	"Sigues Con Él" (2019)	"Definitivamente" (2020)

Dímelo Flow singles chronology
"La Isla" (2019)	"Sigues Con Él" (2019)	"Bota Fuego" (remix) (2019)

Music video
- "Sigues Con Él" on YouTube

"Sigues Con Él" (transl. "Are You Still With Him") is a song by American singer Arcángel, Panamanian singer Sech and Panamanian record producer Dímelo Flow. It was released on December 13, 2019, as the fourth single from the former's fourth studio album Historias de un Capricornio (2019). A remix version with fellow American singer Romeo Santos was released on April 10, 2020, as one of the singles from the former's fifth studio album Los Favoritos 2 (2020).

With production being handled by Dímelo Flow alongside Jvy Boy and Keytin, "Sigues Con Él" is a reggaeton song where, thematically, a woman refuses to leave an unsatisfied relationship. "Sigues Con Él" was a global success, topping the US Latin Airplay and Latin Rhythm Airplay charts and peaking within the top 10 in eight countries. It also peaked at number 78 on the US Billboard Hot 100, making it Arcángel's first entry on the chart and Sech's third entry. In 2020, it received a Latin music octuple-platinum certification by the Recording Industry Association of America (RIAA).

== Background and composition ==
After Arcángel released his third studio album Ares, which contained Latin trap material, he would end his contract with Pina Records in 2019. He later began teasing his fourth album Historias de un Capricornio through interviews and by releasing a few singles. One of its singles, "Sigues Con Él", was released for digital download and streaming on December 13, 2019, through Rimas Entertainment.

"Sigues Con Él" is a reggaeton song, with the lyrics talking about a woman who refuses to leave a dissatisfied relationship. Alluding to the song title, the singers use the lyric "¿Por qué sigues con él?" ("Why are you still with him?"), in the chorus, as a way of asking the woman why she is still with her partner. A remix version of "Sigues Con Él", which adds a verse by American singer Romeo Santos, was released on April 10, 2020, through Rimas Entertainment. It serves as one of the singles from Arcángel's fifth studio album Los Favoritos 2 (2020). Further, it includes incorporations of tropical music.

== Reception and commercial performance ==
An author from Primera Hora said that the song "presents a sensual, romantic and at the same time nostalgic sense with reggaeton rhythms".

"Sigues Con Él" peaked at number 78 on the Billboard Hot 100 and, by 2020, sold over 480,000 units through sales and streams in the United States, later receiving a in the Latin field octuple-platinum certification by the Recording Industry Association of America (RIAA). The peak marked Arcángel's first appearance on the chart and Sech's third appearance. The song would peak at number three on the US Hot Latin Songs chart; it also topped the US Latin Airplay chart, in its fourteenth week, and the US Latin Rhythm Airplay chart.

The song also peaked within the top 10 in eight countries, including Colombia (7), Costa Rica (7), the Dominican Republic (10), Honduras (8), Panama (8), Paraguay (8), and Puerto Rico (6). By the end of 2020, it stood as the best performing track in the Dominican Republic, and also appeared within the top 10 of year-end charts in Colombia, Guatemala, and Paraguay.

== Charts ==
=== Weekly charts ===
Weekly chart performance for "Sigues Con Él"
Chart (2019–2020)	Peak position
Argentina Hot 100 (Billboard)	6
Colombia (Monitor Latino)	7
Costa Rica (Monitor Latino)	7
Dominican Republic (Monitor Latino)	10
Ecuador (Monitor Latino)	11
Global 200 (Billboard)	159
Guatemala (Monitor Latino)	19
Honduras (Monitor Latino)	8
Panama (Monitor Latino)	8
Paraguay (Monitor Latino)	8
Puerto Rico (Monitor Latino)	6
Spain (Promusicae)	16
Spain (Promusicae) Remix version	35
US Billboard Hot 100	78
US Hot Latin Songs (Billboard)	3
US Latin Airplay (Billboard)	1
US Latin Pop Airplay (Billboard)	3
US Latin Rhythm Airplay (Billboard)	1
Venezuela Urbano (Monitor Latino)	6

=== Year-end charts ===
2020 year-end chart performance for "Sigues Con Él"
Chart (2020)	Position
Colombia (Monitor Latino)	4
Costa Rica (Monitor Latino)	14
Dominican Republic (Monitor Latino)	1
Ecuador (Monitor Latino)	30
El Salvador (Monitor Latino)	27
Guatemala (Monitor Latino)	3
Honduras (Monitor Latino)	12
Latin America (Monitor Latino)	29
Nicaragua (Monitor Latino)	29
Panama (Monitor Latino)	12
Paraguay (Monitor Latino)	9
Peru (Monitor Latino)	24
Puerto Rico (Monitor Latino)	28
Spain (PROMUSICAE)	81
Uruguay (Monitor Latino)	90
US Hot Latin Songs (Billboard)	7
US Latin Airplay (Billboard)	9
US Latin Pop Airplay (Billboard)	9
US Latin Rhythm Airplay (Billboard)	9
Venezuela (Monitor Latino)	14

2021 year-end chart performance for "Sigues Con Él"
Chart (2021)	Position
Panama (Monitor Latino)	95

== Certifications ==
Certifications for "Sigues Con Él"
Region	Certification	Certified units/sales
Spain (Promusicae)	Platinum	40,000^{‡}
United States (RIAA)	8× Platinum (Latin)	480,000^{‡}
United States (RIAA) Remix version	3× Platinum (Latin)	180,000^{‡}
^{‡} Sales+streaming figures based on certification alone.
