= Grupo CIE =

Mexican entertainment company

- Company type: Private
- Industry: Media and Entertainment
- Founded: 1990; 36 years ago
- Headquarters: Mexico City, Mexico
- Key people: Alejandro Soberon Kuri (CEO)
- Products: Concert and movie tickets, theaters, CDs
- Subsidiaries: OCESA, OCESA Teatro, CIE Las Americas, CIE Comercial, CIE Parques de Diversiones, CIE Internacional, OCESA Seitrack, OCESA Colombia.
- Website: www.cie-mexico.com.mx

Grupo CIE (Corporacion Interamericana de Entretenimiento. Spanish for: Interamerican Entertainment Corporation) is a Mexican entertainment and media company. It is leader of Latin American entertainment sector, focusing especially on the markets of Hispanic and Portuguese language, including the Latin market of the United States. Grupo CIE is a Latin American amalgam of Live Nation. The company operates various venues, auditoriums and theme parks throughout Latin America; promotes a variety of live events, commercial fairs and exhibitions; operates ticketing sites including Ticketmaster Mexico and Ticketmaster Brazil); provides sponsorships, foods, promotional drinks and articles for events and entertainment; and participates in the film industry through the production and distribution of films.

== Divisions ==
Grupo CIE is divided into five divisions which controls different sectors of the market:

- CIE Entretenimiento: Which includes OCESA, the main concert and spectacle producer in Latin America, OCESA Colombia, OCESA Seitrack, OCESA Teatro and Ticketmaster Mexico.
- CIE Las Americas: Which includes the operation of Hipodromo de Las Americas horse race track, [Centro Banamex] (Mexico City's main convention center), and the Sports Yak and Yaks Entertainment Centers (which includes bingo and electronic sports bets, as gambling is forbidden in Mexico).
- CIE Comercial: Which includes commercial and media producers like Media Innovations.
- CIE Parques de Diversiones: Managing eight different theme parks in Mexico and Wannado City in Sunrise, Florida, USA.
- CIE Internacional: Controls all the foreign branches of Grupo CIE, including CIE Argentina and CIE Brazil.

== Venues ==
Grupo CIE operates some of the main venues in Mexico like:

- Palacio de los Deportes
- Estadio GNP Seguros
- Auditorio Citibanamex
- Arena VFG
- Teatro Telcel
- Teatro de los Insurgentes
