= Holidays (musical) =

2023 musical

- Official poster for the original Paris production.
- Music: Various
- Lyrics: Various
- Book: Gaétan Borg
- Basis: Madonna discography
- Productions: 2023 Balma (previews); 2023 Paris; 2024 France tour

Holidays (billed as Holidays le Musical) is a jukebox musical, with a book in French by Gaétan Borg, based on the songs recorded by American singer Madonna in the 1980s and 1990s. The title of the musical is taken from the singer's 1983 song "Holiday". The story focuses on a group of four childhood friends who reunite as adults when invited by one of them for a special night before her upcoming wedding.

The original French production, directed by Nathan Guichet (who also conceived the musical and selected the Madonna songs) with choreography by Cécile Chaduteau and musical arrangements by Éric Melville, premiered on 22 September 2023 at L'Odyssée in Balma for three preview performances, and played at the Alhambra in Paris from September 2023 to January 2024 at the Alhambra. It then toured in France in 2024.

== Synopsis ==
Louise, 30, is a French-American heiress to a wine producer who lives in Malibu, California; she is about to get married. She calls three childhood friends with whom she grew up in a French village; they have not seen each other for fourteen years. Nikki is a travel blogger and Instagram influencer; Véronica, a ruthless fashion designer in New York; and Suzanne, a plain girl still stuck in their village. All four were superfans of the popstar as tweens and teenagers, and every year, on Madonna’s birthday, they would gather in Louise's pink bedroom suite, decorated as a Madonna shrine, to mark that special holiday. Louise gives them only three days to join her in the same bedroom.

During a wild evening performing Madonna hits for each other, Louise tells them that it is their last night together, before making a special announcement. Her friends realize that Louise and her fiancé disagree on many issues, and they suggest that she might wish to rethink the marriage. A lesbian romance blossoms between two of the friends.

== Musical Numbers ==
- "La Isla Bonita"
- "Open Your Heart"
- "Express Yourself"
- "Papa Don’t Preach"
- "Secret"
- "Like a Prayer"

== Productions ==
The show premiered on 22 September 2023 at L'Odyssée in Balma in southwestern France for three preview performances. It transferred to the Alhambra in Paris and officially opened on 29 September 2023, closing in January 2024.

After the Parisian run, the musical was expected to tour in France, beginning at the Théâtre Galli in Sanary-sur-Mer on 5 April 2024.

== Critical reception ==
Laura Capelle, writing in The New York Times, called the musical "plucky", despite "somewhat contrived" shoehorning of the Madonna songs into the story. She wrote that the four leading women "all have moments of brilliance, and work hard to make the often dubious script shine". Stephany Kong of MusicalAvenue, said the musical "is a cocktail of good humor served by high quality stage design and performances: a must-see", though she missed a live orchestra.

== Cast and characters ==
| Character | Balma | Paris | France tour |
| Character | 2023 | 2023 | 2024 |
|---|---|---|---|
| Louise | Juliette Behar | Juliette Behar | Juliette Behar |
| Véronica | Fanny Delaigue | Fanny Delaigue | Fanny Delaigue |
| Nikki | Nevedya | Nevedya | Nevedya |
| Suzanne | Ana Ka | Ana Ka | Ana Ka |
| 16-year-old Louise | Naïmy Guichet | Naïmy Guichet | Naïmy Guichet |
| 16-year-old Veronica | Joséphine Auzat | Joséphine Auzat | Joséphine Auzat |
| 16-year-old Nikki | Ilona Samassi | Ilona Samassi | Ilona Samassi |
| 16-year-old Suzanne | Sarah Vinum Baudrand | Sarah Vinum Baudrand | Sarah Vinum Baudrand |
| 10-year-old Louise | Lejla Kurtic | Lejla Kurtic | Lejla Kurtic |
| 10-year-old Veronica | Lila Watson | Lila Watson | Lila Watson |
| 10-year-old Nikki | Melina Masungi | Melina Masungi | Melina Masungi |
| 10-year-old Suzanne | Marylou Alexis | Marylou Alexis | Marylou Alexis |
