= La Jumpa =

2022 single by Arcángel and Bad Bunny

Single by Arcángel and Bad Bunny

from the album Sr. Santos
- Language: Spanish
- Released: November 30, 2022
- Genre: Hip house; drill
- Length: 4:15
- Label: Rimas
- Songwriters: Austin Santos; Benito Martínez; MAG; Julia Lewis; Kamil Jacob Assad
- Producers: MAG; Julia Lewis

Arcángel singles chronology
"JS4E" (2022)	"La Jumpa" (2022)	"Kame Hame" (2023)

Bad Bunny singles chronology
"El Apagón" (2022)	"La Jumpa" (2022)	"Gato de Noche" (2022)

Music video
- "La Jumpa" on YouTube

"La Jumpa" (English: "The Jump" or "The Jumpshot") is a song by American rapper Arcángel and Puerto Rican rapper Bad Bunny, from the former's fifth studio album Sr. Santos (2022). It was originally released on November 30, 2022, by Rimas Entertainment. The song was written by both rappers, among others, and its production was done by Mag and Julia Lewis.

== Chart performance ==
"La Jumpa" debuted and peaked at number 68 on the US Billboard Hot 100 dated December 17, 2022. Additionally, it peaked at number 3 on the US Hot Latin Songs chart as well as peaking at number 8 on the Billboard Global 200.

== Audio visualizer ==
A visualizer for the song was uploaded to YouTube on November 30, 2022.

== Music video ==
The music video for "La Jumpa" was released on YouTube on February 2, 2023.

== Charts ==
=== Weekly charts ===
Weekly chart performance for "La Jumpa"
Chart (2022–2023)	Peak position
Argentina Hot 100 (Billboard)	27
Bolivia (Billboard)	4
Chile (Billboard)	2
Colombia (Billboard)	3
Costa Rica Streaming Songs (Fonotica)	2
Dominican Republic (SODINPRO)	1
Ecuador (Billboard)	2
Global 200 (Billboard)	15
Mexico (Billboard)	2
Peru (Billboard)	3
Portugal (AFP)	107
Spain (Promusicae)	1
US Billboard Hot 100	68
US Hot Latin Songs (Billboard)	3
US Latin Rhythm Airplay (Billboard)	20

=== Year-end charts ===
Year-end chart performance for "La Jumpa"
Chart (2023)	Position
Global 200 (Billboard)	86
US Hot Latin Songs (Billboard)	28

== Certifications ==
Certifications and sales for "La Jumpa"
Region	Certification	Certified units/sales
Spain (Promusicae)	6× Platinum	360,000^{‡}
^{‡} Sales+streaming figures based on certification alone.
