= El Fenómeno =

2008 studio album by Arcángel

Studio album by Arcángel
- Released: December 9, 2008
- Recorded: 2007–2008
- Genre: Urban pop, R&B, reggaeton, hip hop
- Label: Machete; Flow Factory Inc; Mas Flow Inc.
- Producer: Luny Tunes, Diesel, Mambo Kingz, Nely "El Arma Secreta", Tainy, Predikador, DJ Nelson, Noriega, Urba & Monserrate

Arcángel chronology
El Fenómeno (2008)	Sentimiento, Elegancia & Maldad (2013)

Singles from El Fenómeno
- 1. "Por Amar a Ciegas" Released: December 3, 2008; 2. "Pa' Que la Pases Bien" Released: 2008

El Fenómeno (English: The Phenomenon) is the major-label debut studio album by singer-songwriter Arcángel, released on December 9, 2008, through Machete Music. The album contains appearances by J-King, Don Omar and Tempo.

El Fenómeno was released due to the unsuccessful attempt to release his previous album, La Maravilla. Originally intended to be released on November 25, 2008, it was suddenly pushed back to December 9, 2008. The album contains six tracks from his previous unreleased album La Maravilla, and also includes his first commercially successful single "Chica Virtual", previously released on the DJ Nelson compilation album Flow La Discoteka 2. The lead single from the album, "Por Amar a Ciegas", was released on December 3, 2008.

== Track listing ==
#	Title	Production credits	Time
01	"Ahí Eh (Intro)"	Diesel	3:31
02	"Por Amar a Ciegas"	Luny Tunes, Tainy & Noriega	3:54
03	"Él No Se Va a Enterar"	Luny Tunes, Tainy & Noriega	3:01
04	"Pienso en Ti"	Mambo Kingz	3:13
05	"Demente Bailando"	Luny Tunes, Tainy	2:58
06	"Agresivo 3" (featuring J-King)	Luny Tunes	4:41
07	"Ta' Bueno el Ambiente"	Noltom, Noriega	3:36
08	"I Got Flow"	Urba & Monserrate	3:55
09	"Fuiste Tú Quien Perdió"	DJ Nelson	2:57
10	"Yo Te Enseño"	Tainy	3:31
11	"Nada Malo"	Musicólogo & Menes	2:54
12	"Aprovecha el Tiempo"	Keko Music, Ingeniero	3:42
13	"Enamorado de Ti"	Mambo Kingz	3:53
14	"Química Sustancia" (featuring Don Omar)	Nely "El Arma Secreta"	4:38
15	"Pa' Que la Pases Bien"	Tainy	3:34
16	"Vamos En Un Viaje (Si, Si)"	Mambo Kingz	3:45
17	"Ganas de Ti"	Nely El Arma Secreta	2:54
18	"Mi Primera Canción" (featuring Tempo)	Dj Black, Paralax	4:28
19	"Chica Virtual"	DJ Nelson	4:24
20	"Ahí Eh (Predi Club Version)"	Predikador	4:02
21	Por Amar A Ciegas Hip Hop Version	Luny Tunes & Noriega	3:55

== Chart performance ==
Chart (2008)	Peak position
U.S. Billboard Top Heatseekers	10
U.S. Billboard Top Latin Albums	14
U.S. Billboard Latin Rhythm Albums	3
