= Historias de un Capricornio =

Studio album by Arcángel
- Released: December 20, 2019
- Genre: Reggaeton
- Length: 51:54
- Language: Spanish
- Label: Rimas

Arcángel chronology
Ares (2018)	Historias de un Capricornio (2019)	Los Favoritos 2 (2020)

Singles from Historias de un Capricornio
- 1. "Te Esperaré" Released: August 16, 2019; 2. "Invicto" Released: October 11, 2019; 3. "Memoria Rota" Released: October 25, 2019; 4. "Sigues Con Él" Released: December 13, 2019

Historias de un Capricornio (English: Stories of a Capricorn) is the fourth studio album by American reggaeton singer Arcángel. The album was released on December 20, 2019, through Rimas Entertainment and contains collaborations with Ozuna, Bad Bunny, Manuel Turizo, Dímelo Flow, Sech, and Myke Towers.

This album marks the singer's first album release under the Rimas label, following his final album under the Pina Records label, Ares.

== Background ==
Following the release of his third studio album Ares, Arcángel would end his longtime contract with Pina Records in 2019. Through interviews with the singer relating to his then-upcoming album, he mentioned that the album would be dedicated to his mother, and the album would contain appearances by Ozuna, Bad Bunny, and Manuel Turizo, whom Arcángel did not specify at the time.

That same year, the singer would also be involved in various controversies, a court case for domestic violence in April 2019, having a heart attack in September 2019, and an incident that led to the death of Latin trap singer Kevin Fret, whom Arcángel mentioned that they were friends.

== Promotion ==
=== Singles ===
"Te Esperaré" was released on August 16, 2019, as the lead single for Historias de un Capricornio. Arcángel told Billboard that the song was originally recorded in 2015 and that it was supposed to be a slow song. He had also told them that he was selective with the music he gave to Pina Records.

"Invicto" with was released as the second single for Historias de un Capricornio on October 11, 2019, and "Memoria Rota" with Myke Towers was released as the third single on October 25, 2019. The singer told Remezcla that it was his favorite song.

"Sigues Con Él" with Sech and Dímelo Flow was released on December 13, 2019. The song topped the Billboard Latin Airplay and Latin Rhythm Airplay charts on May 23, 2020, as well as peaking at number 3 on the Hot Latin Songs chart. A remix version with Romeo Santos was released on April 10, 2020, and would be included in the singer's compilation album Los Favoritos 2.

== Track listing ==
Historias de un Capricornio track listing
No.	Title	Writer(s)	Producer(s)	Length
1.	"Mi Testimonio"	Austin Agustín Santos	Josias de la Cruz; Tainy	4:45
2.	"Al Volante"	A. Santos	DJ Luian; Mambo Kings	3:20
3.	"Rehén" (with Ozuna)	A. Santos; Jean Carlos Ozuna	DJ Luian; Jowny Boom Boom; Mambo Kings	2:55
4.	"Ponte Bonita"	A. Santos; Rayvan	Justbeat; Mambo Kings; Revol	3:13
5.	"Infeliz" (with Bad Bunny)	A. Santos; Benito Antonio Martínez Ocasio	Chris Jedi; Dulce Como Candy; Luis E. Ortiz; Santo Niño	3:41
6.	"Video Llamada"	A. Santos; Chris Jedi; Joan A. Gonzalez	C. Jeday; Dulce Como Candy; Gaby Music; Luis E. Ortiz; Santo Niño	3:35
7.	"Doble Cara"	A. Santos; Kevyn Cruz; Manuel Lorente	El Genio; Keytin; Kevin ADG; Lexuz; Shakal	3:05
8.	"Hábitos" (with Manuel Turizo)	A. Santos; K. Cruz; René Cano	Jowan; Noise-up	3:01
9.	"Lléname de Luz"	A. Santos	DJ Luian; Hydro; Jowny Boom Boom; Mambo Kings; Santo Niño	3:02
10.	"No Salgo de Casa"	A. Santos	Young Class	2:57
11.	"Sigues Con Él" (with Sech and Dímelo Flow)	A. Santos; Carlos Isaías Morales Williams	Dímelo Flow; Jvy Boy; Keytin	3:46
12.	"Capricornio"	A. Santos	DJ Luian; Hydro; Jowny Boom Boom; Mambo Kings; Santo Niño	3:48
13.	"Memoria Rota" (with Myke Towers)	A. Santos; Michael Torres	Dale Play	3:25
14.	"Te Esperaré"	A. Santos	O'Neill; Bory	3:16
15.	"Invicto"	A. Santos	Magnifico	4:01
Total length:				51:54

== Charts ==
=== Weekly charts ===
Weekly chart performance for Historias de un Capricornio
Chart (2020)	Peak position
Spanish Albums (PROMUSICAE)	3
US Latin Rhythm Albums (Billboard)	2
US Top Latin Albums (Billboard)	2

=== Year-end charts ===
Year-end chart performance for Historias de un Capricornio
Chart (2020)	Position
US Latin Rhythm Albums (Billboard)	13
US Top Latin Albums (Billboard)	15

== Certifications ==
Certifications for Historias de un Capricornio
Region	Certification	Certified units/sales
United States (RIAA)	Platinum (Latin)	60,000^{‡}
^{‡} Sales+streaming figures based on certification alone.
