= JS4E =

Single by Arcángel

from the album Sr. Santos
- Language: Spanish
- Released: November 21, 2022
- Genre: Latin trap
- Length: 3:58
- Label: Rimas
- Songwriter: Austin Agustín Santos
- Producer: D-Note the Beatllionarie

Arcángel singles chronology
"Loco" (2022)	"JS4E" (2022)	"La Jumpa" (2022)

Music video
- "JS4E" on YouTube

"JS4E" (short for "Justin Santos Forever") is a song by American rapper and singer Arcángel. It was released on November 21, 2022, through Rimas Entertainment, as the first single from his fifth studio album, Sr. Santos (2022). The song is a tribute to Arcángel's brother, Justin Santos, who died some time ago in a vehicle accident.

== Background and release ==
"JS4E" is released as the first single from his fifth studio album Sr. Santos, released a month after the song. The song is a tribute to Justin Santos, Arcángel's younger brother, who died in a traffic accident while driving on the Teodoro Moscoso Bridge in Puerto Rico. "JS4E" is released exactly one year after his death, which occurred on November 21, 2021.

== Music video ==
The music video for "JS4E" was released simultaneously with the song on November 21, 2021, via Arcángel's YouTube channel. The video shows excerpts of the process in which Arcángel tattooed his brother's image on his chest, which required five tattoo artists and four hours of anesthesia one day and another four hours the next day.

== Awards and nominations ==
List of awards and nominations for "JS4E"
Award	Year	Category	Result	Ref.
Juventud Awards	2023	Best Trap Song	Nominated	
Tu Música Urbano Awards	2023	Top Song – Trap	Nominated	
Tu Música Urbano Awards	2023	Video of the Year	Won	

== Charts ==
Weekly chart performance for "JS4E"
Chart (2022)	Peak position
Colombia (Billboard)	14
Spain (PROMUSICAE)	46
US Hot Latin Songs (Billboard)	23

== Certifications ==
Certifications and sales for "JS4E"
Region	Certification	Certified units/sales
Spain (PROMUSICAE)	Gold	30,000^{‡}
^{‡} Sales+streaming figures based on certification alone.
