= Hace Mucho Tiempo =

2013 single by Arcángel

Promotional single by Arcángel

from the album Sentimiento, Elegancia & Maldad
- Language: Spanish
- English title: "A Long Time Ago"
- Released: June 21, 2013
- Genre: Urban pop
- Label: Pina; Flow Factory
- Songwriters: Austin Santos Rosas; Rafael Pina Nieves; Marcos Masís Fernández
- Producers: Tainy; Raphy Pina

Arcángel singles chronology
"Mi Vida No Va a Cambiar" (2013)	"Hace Mucho Tiempo" (2013)	"Alza la Mano" (2013)

Music video
- "Hace Mucho Tiempo" on YouTube

"Hace Mucho Tiempo" is a song by American singer Arcángel. It was released on June 21, 2013, through Pina Records and Flow Factory, as the first promotional single from his second studio album Sentimiento, Elegancia & Maldad (2013).

== Composition ==
The song was written by Austin "Arcángel" Santos Rosas, Rafael "Raphy" Pina Nieves and Marcos "Tainy" Masís Fernández, while the production was carried out by the latter two and the mixing was carried out by Tainy and DJ Luian.

== Critical reception ==
The American publication MundoNow mentioned "Haga Mucho Tiempo" as "some of Arcángel's songs that have marked milestones in the Latin trap genre" and called it "a retrospective and a declaration of intent" and highlighted that the melody feels nostalgic, but with a vision of the future, capturing the very essence of an evolving genre".

== Audio visualizers ==
The first audio visualizer for "Hace Mucho Tiempo" was published on Pina Records' YouTube channel on June 21, 2013, at the same time as the release of the single. The second audio visualizer was published on Arcángel's YouTube channel on August 20, 2013, a day after the release of the album Sentimiento, Elegancia & Maldad.

== Music video ==
The music video for "Haga Mucho Tiempo" was also published on August 20, 2013, through Arcángel's YouTube channel. Under the direction of Colombian director Gustavo Camacho, filming lasted about 2 weeks and toured tourist destinations in Paris, Venice, Greece and Norway. The video became the third with the most views on his channel until March 2023.

== Charts ==
=== Weekly charts ===
Weekly chart performance for "Hace Mucho Tiempo"
Chart (2013)	Peak position
US Hot Latin Songs (Billboard)	34
US Latin Digital Song Sales (Billboard)	33
US Latin Rhythm Airplay (Billboard)	19
US Tropical Airplay (Billboard)	12

=== Year-end charts ===
2013 year-end chart performance for "Hace Mucho Tiempo"
Chart (2013)	Position
US Latin Rhythm Airplay (Billboard)	33

== Certifications ==
Certifications and sales for "Hace Mucho Tiempo"
Region	Certification	Certified units/sales
United States (RIAA)	Platinum (Latin)	60,000^{‡}
^{‡} Sales+streaming figures based on certification alone.
