= La Chamba (song) =

Single by Arcángel and Peso Pluma

from the album Sentimiento, Elegancia y Más Maldad
- Language: Spanish
- Released: 30 October 2023
- Genre: Reggaeton; Latin trap
- Length: 2:53
- Label: Rimas
- Songwriters: Austin Agustín Santos; Hassan Emilio Kabande Laija; Nicole Denise Cucco
- Producer: Tainy

Arcángel singles chronology
| "Mi Condena" (2023) | "La Chamba" (2023) | "Plutón" (2023) |

Peso Pluma singles chronology
| "Bipolar" (2023) | "La Chamba" (2023) | "Peligro" (2023) |

Music video
- "La Chamba" on YouTube

"La Chamba" is a song performed and written by American rapper and singer Arcángel and Mexican singer and rapper Peso Pluma. It was released on October 30, 2023, through Rimas as the first single of the former's eighth studio album Sentimiento, Elegancia y Más Maldad (2023). The song was produced by Puerto Rican producer Tainy and was also written by Nicki Nicole.

== Composition ==
A reggaeton song, the song lyrically talks about the pride of working hard and being taught to work for what they have, in lyrics such as "Soy un muchacho que viene de abajo / No le temo al trabajo, es que me gusta la chamba."

== Promotion ==
=== Preview ===
A trailer for the song was uploaded on Arcángel's YouTube channel on October 29, 2023. It was directed by Omar Rivera and produced by Mayte Avina, and features Mexican-American actor Danny Trejo. The trailer starts with Trejo getting his boots shined by two young boys, telling them both how a person is willing to sacrifice everything, originally coming "from the bottom," and telling them "ever since [he] was a kid, he likes the job.".

=== Music video ===
A music video was released a day later, as a continuation from the trailer. After Trejo receives a shoeshine, he is seen sitting at a table, thinking about a gunfire that occurred. Arcángel and Peso Pluma can be seen as employees at a restaurant and are also seen as accomplices to Trejo. Throughout the video, both artists help Trejo in avoiding his rivals.

=== Visualizer ===
A visualizer for the song was uploaded on the day of the release of Sentimiento, Elegancia y Más Maldad, simultaneously with the other visualizers for the other songs on the album.

== Charts ==
Chart performance for "La Chamba"
| Chart (2023) | Peak position |
|---|---|
| US Hot Latin Songs (Billboard) | 50 |

== Release history ==
Release dates and formats for "La Chamba"
| Region | Date | Format(s) | Label(s) | Ref. |
|---|---|---|---|---|
| Various | October 30, 2023 | Digital download; streaming | Rimas | |
