= Arcángel =

American rapper and singer (born 1985)

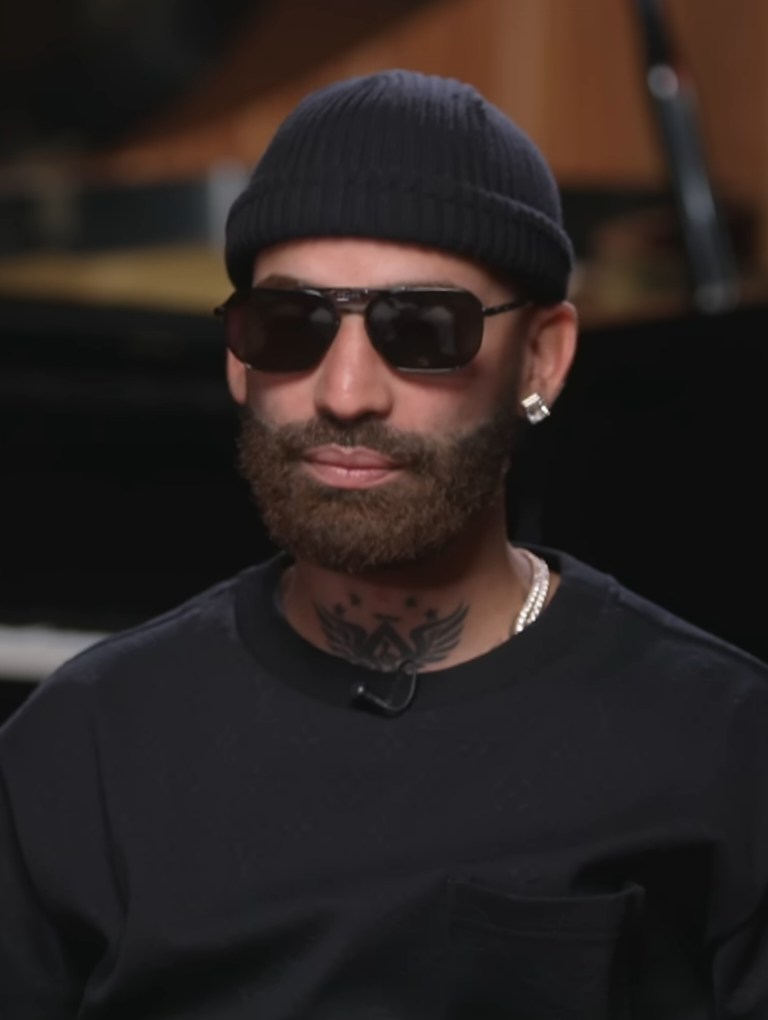
- Arcángel in 2023
- Born: Austin Agustín Santos; December 23, 1985 (age 40); New York City, New York, U.S.
- Other names: La Maravilla; Arca; La Marash; Mr. Cash and Carry
- Occupations: Rapper; singer; songwriter
- Years active: 2004–present
- Works: Discography
- Spouses: Alejandra Pascual (m. 2006; div. 2020) Janexsy Figueroa (m. 2021)
- Children: 2
- Musical career
- Genres: Reggaeton; Latin trap; hip-hop; R&B
- Labels: Flow Factory; Mas Flow; Machete; Universal Latino; Pina; Sony Latin; Rimas
- Formerly of: Arcángel & De la Ghetto

Austin Agustín Santos (born December 23, 1985), better known by his stage name Arcángel, is an American rapper and singer. He is often described as one of the most influential artists in the Latin urban genre, as well in Latin music overall, and one of the pioneers of Latin trap music. Around 2002, he became interested in becoming a performer of reggaeton. He met fellow singer De la Ghetto while living in Puerto Rico, where they eventually formed a popular then-underground reggaeton duo, Arcángel & De la Ghetto.

While releasing music with De la Ghetto during the mid-2000s, he released songs that eventually became popular in both the United States and Puerto Rico, including "Aparentemente", "Agresivo", "Sorpresa", and "Mi Fanática". The duo went on to pursue solo careers following their separation in 2007; Arcángel also started a record label of his own. Since the start of his solo career in 2008, he has released hit singles such as "Pa' Que la Pases Bien", "Por Amar a Ciegas", "Hace Mucho Tiempo", "Me Prefieres a Mí", "Me Acostumbré", "Tú No Vive' Así", "Sigues Con Él", "La Jumpa", and "ALV". Arcángel's second major-label album, Sentimiento, Elegancia & Maldad (2013), peaked at number one on the US Top Latin Albums chart, with his later solo studio albums—Ares (2018), Historias de un Capricornio (2019), and Los Favoritos 2 (2020)—appearing on the chart's top five.

== Early life ==
Austin Agustín Santos Rosas was born on December 23, 1985, in New York City to Dominican parents. He and his family moved to Puerto Rico when he was 3 months old, and eventually they began moving back and forth between New York City and Puerto Rico, starting when he was 12. His mother, Carmen Rosa, was a former member of the all-women merengue group, Las Chicas del Can, who were popular from the mid-1980s to the early 1990s. Santos grew up listening to various types of music and has been a fan of rock music, particularly Draco Rosa, a Puerto Rican pop rock artist and a former member of Menudo. Santos was not always a fan of reggaeton; he claims that it is not his favorite type of music, but it is easy to sing to. During the early 2000s, Santos grew fond of the new kind of music.

== Music career ==
=== 2004–2007: Career beginnings with De la Ghetto ===
After returning to Puerto Rico in 2002, Santos had decided to follow in the footsteps of the upbringing of reggaeton music. He went on to form part of an underground reggaeton act with De la Ghetto, Arcángel & De la Ghetto. The duo was signed to reggaeton artist Zion's record label, Baby Records, a subsidiary of Universal Music Group. The duo were also involved with Machete Music in 2004 during the time that they were recording for reggaeton compilation albums. Arcángel & De la Ghetto rose to fame in 2006 on the reggaeton compilation album hosted by Héctor el Father, Sangre Nueva, with their hit song, "Ven Pégate". They were also featured on the Luny Tunes-hosted compilation Mas Flow: Los Benjamins in 2006.

Though an active musical duo, Arcángel & De la Ghetto have never released a studio album since the formation of the duo. Any production they had been involved with only resulted in tracks and recordings being included on compilation albums or leaked onto the Internet. This was due to a conflict with Baby Records, because the company was not releasing any material by Arcángel & De la Ghetto onto an album of their own. Arcángel claimed to have even spent $150,000 on producing the album K-Libre (2006), which resulted in the label not releasing it to market. The tracks produced were said to have been leaked onto the Internet instead. Arcángel then filed a lawsuit with Baby Records in 2007 for $1,000,000 and eventually left the record company in December 2006, when he announced that he was embarking on a solo career and founding a label of his own.

=== 2008–2013: Solo career, El Fenómeno, and Sentimiento, Elegancia & Maldad ===
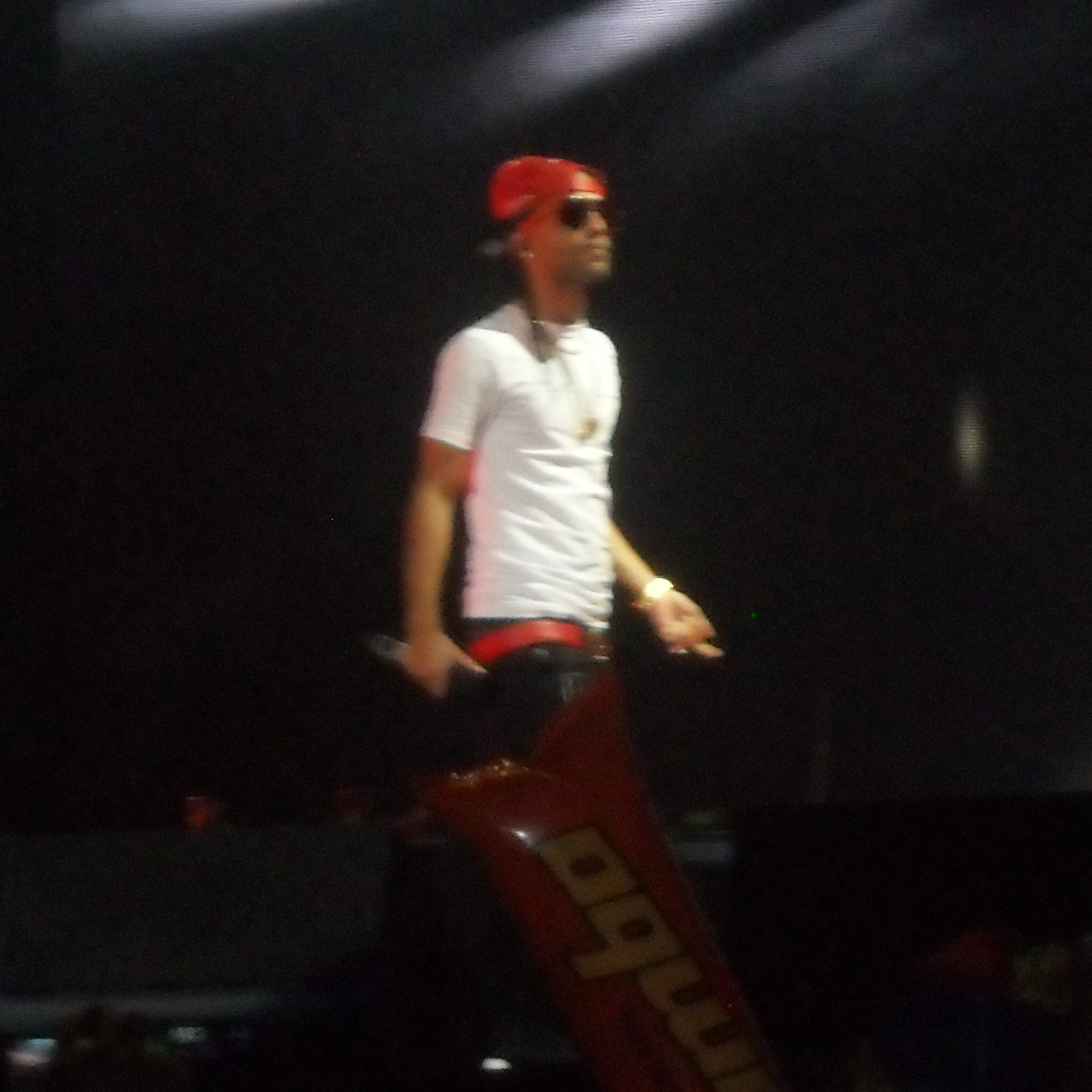
Arcángel on stage in 2013

After the separation of the duo in early 2007, Arcángel began his solo career, working with various reggaeton producers and performers on compilation albums. Most notable of them was a compilation album produced in 2007, Flow la Discoteka 2, which was produced by songwriter and record producer DJ Nelson. The album was an upbringing of different artists trying to rise to fame, one of those including Arcángel, who made a track titled "Chica Virtual", which went on to be one of his most recognizable songs, as well as being a popular airplay single on American Latin Urban radio stations, charting at number 9 on the Billboard Latin Rhythm Airplay chart. It also charted at number 22 on the Billboard Hot Latin Tracks chart.

In July 2008, Arcángel told Billboard that he was working on his debut album La Maravilla, which was set to be a Latin urban album and was set to release in September or October 2008. The album was eventually cancelled due to tracks of the album being leaked onto the internet that same year. One of the internet leaks, a song titled "Pa' Que la Pases Bien", went on to be a popular airplay track on American Latin Urban radio stations across the United States. The unreleased album being leaked onto the internet resulted in making Arcángel more popular among reggaeton fans in the United States, as well as Puerto Rico.

Arcángel founded Flow Factory Inc. in 2006, and his mother became his manager afterward. He claimed that it was easier having his mother be his manager so that he would not have to pay 20 percent of money received from record sales to his record label and manager. He went on to release his debut album, El Fenómeno, in late 2008. The album included songs that were produced in the last quarter of 2007 and the first quarter of 2008, including the DJ Nelson produced "Chica Virtual". Half of the album was tracks that he originally produced for an album that was to be released in the first quarter of 2008. The other half of the album also included newly produced tracks, ones including "Por Amar a Ciegas", which went on to become a successful airplay single on Latin urban radio stations across the United States.

In mid-January 2009, Arcángel announced plans for a European tour sometime during 2009, in promotion of his debut album, El Fenómeno, and to receive more exposure across the world from reggaeton fans. To comment on the tour, he claimed that in order for it to be successful, good equipment would be highly important, and by going on the tour, he would be able to learn more about a continental tour experience. Arcángel confirmed that he would be touring in several countries, including Germany, France, Portugal, Spain, England, the Netherlands and Denmark. His mixtape The Problem Child was released in April 2010, with his following mixtape Optimus A.R.C.A. released in October 2010.

In February 2012, Arcángel signed with Pina Records, which is based in San Juan, Puerto Rico and operates offices in Colombia and Venezuela. Through the label, Arcángel released "Hace Mucho Tiempo", the lead single from his 2013 album Sentimiento, Elegancia & Maldad, which both performed successfully. The album debuted at number one on the US Top Latin Albums chart, making it his first number-one, and first top-10, studio album.

=== 2015–2019: Ares and Historias de un Capricornio ===
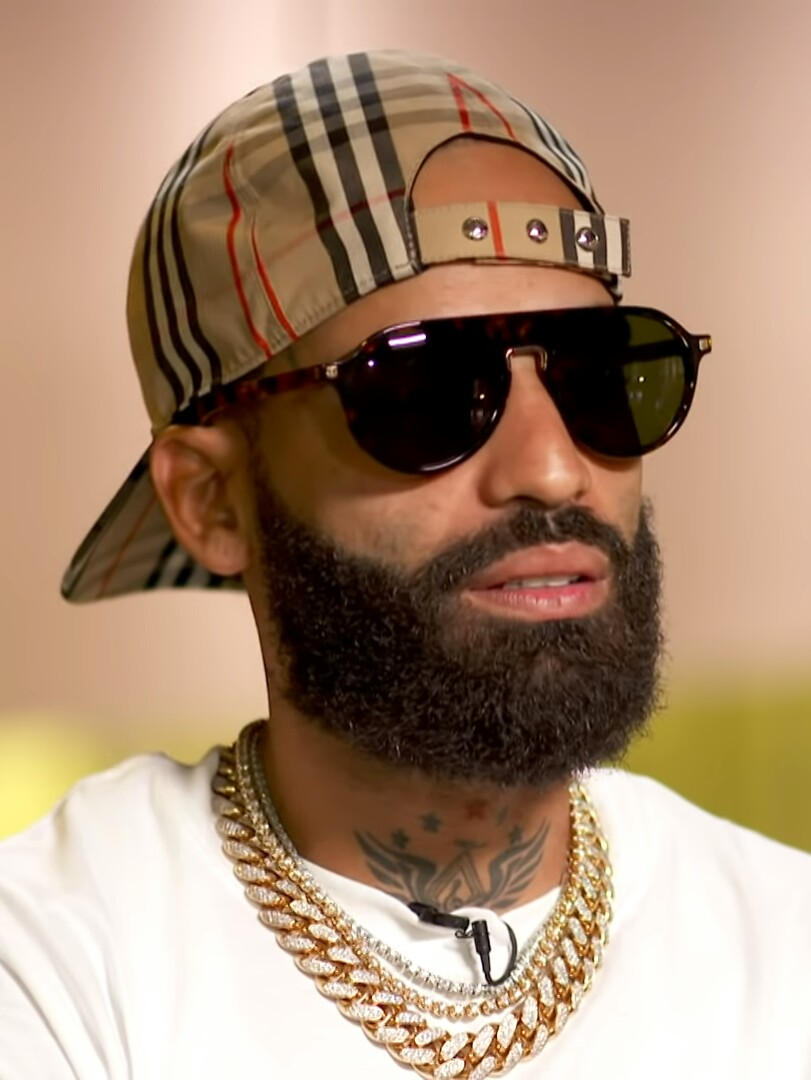
Arcángel during an interview in 2019

In 2015, Arcángel and fellow producer DJ Luian released their collaborative album Los Favoritos, which features Nicky Jam, fellow Puerto Rican artist Farruko, and Colombian singer Maluma. The album was successful, debuting atop the US Latin Rhythm Albums chart and at number two on the US Top Latin Albums chart. In 2016, he signed with Hear This Music and released "La Ocasión" along with Ozuna, De la Ghetto, and Anuel AA, which was a big hit. In 2017, he collaborated with Ozuna and J Balvin on the Chris Jedi-produced track "Ahora Dice", and also collaborated with Snow Tha Product on "Nuestra Canción Pt. 2".

In 2018, he released his third studio album, Ares, which was composed mostly of Latin trap, something much different from his past albums, which were mostly reggaeton. The album featured Puerto Rican artist Bad Bunny and Colombian artist J Balvin.

In 2019, he collaborated with Myke Towers, Farruko, Sech and Zion on the remix for "Si Se Da". That same year, he ended his contract with Pina Records and signed with Rimas Entertainment, where he released singles to promote his fourth studio album, Historias de un Capricornio, which included collaborations with Ozuna, Bad Bunny, Myke Towers, among others. He released "Te Esperaré" on August 16, 2019, as the album's lead single; "Memoria Rota" with Towers was released on October 25, 2019, as its second single. The album's fourth single, "Sigues Con Él" featuring Sech, marked a major breakthrough for Arcángel, as it peaked at number 78 on the Billboard Hot 100, marking his first appearance on the chart.

=== 2020–2021: Los Favoritos 2 and 2.5 ===
In April 2020, Arcángel and Sech released a remix version of "Sigues Con Él" with Romeo Santos. Later, the rapper released a few more singles to promote his fifth studio album Los Favoritos 2, which is a sequel to his 2015 album with DJ Luian, Los Favoritos; the singles "Tussi" and "Amantes y Amigos" were released in September and October 2020. The album, which was originally planned to be released in 2017, contains a sequel to "Aparentemente" with Yaga & Mackie and De la Ghetto titled "Aparentemente 2," as well as collaborations with Cosculluela, Ozuna, Wisin & Yandel, Romeo Santos, among others.

In April 2021, Arcángel and Colombian rapper Farina released their collaborative EP FloWres, which was supported by their single "La Boca". In September of the same year, he released his sixth studio album, Los Favoritos 2.5, which was supported by the single "Insegura" and contains collaborations with Zion & Lennox, Nicky Jam, Tempo, among others. In November 2021, Arcángel's younger brother, Justin Santos, died in a car accident while visiting Puerto Rico.

=== 2022–present: Sr. Santos and Sentimiento, Elegancia y Más Maldad ===
In November 2022, a year after the death of Justin Santos, Arcángel released the single "JS4E" and announced his seventh studio album, Sr. Santos, to be a tribute to his brother. A week later, he released the album's second single, "La Jumpa" with Bad Bunny, which became another hit single for Arcángel, peaking at number 68 on the US Billboard Hot 100. Sr. Santos was released on December 1, 2022, containing collaborations with Myke Towers, Young Miko, Eladio Carrión, Bizarrap, among others. The album peaked at number three on the US Top Latin Albums chart, achieving his sixth top 10 on the chart.

In March 2023, Arcángel joined Bizarrap to release his 54th "Music Sessions", which was originally teased on social media before release. After the release of several singles, the singer announced his eighth studio album, Sentimiento, Elegancia y Más Maldad, which is a sequel to his second album, Sentimiento, Elegancia & Maldad. Following the announcement, Arcángel released the album's lead single, "La Chamba" with Peso Pluma, which was announced with a trailer featuring American actor Danny Trejo, released on October 30, 2023. The album was released on November 17, 2023, with most of the album's production done by Dímelo Flow. On this album, "ALV" with Grupo Frontera became a hit in other countries.

== Controversy ==
Since 2007, Arcángel has released a series of tiraderas (diss tracks) under the title "Feliz Navidad", with most of them being produced by DJ Luian. Farruko, Wisin, Tito El Bambino, among others, have been mentioned by Arcángel in at least one of his diss tracks. In December 2023, Arcángel released "Feliz Navidad 8", which is a diss track against Anuel AA, Rochy RD and Ozuna. The release of the track started a feud between the singer and Anuel; the reason for its release was Anuel ending his business relationship with his longtime manager, Frabián Eli, who is Arcángel's brother-in-law. Anuel responded with the release of "Glock, Glock, Glock", where he mentions that without Bad Bunny, Arcángel could not make a hit single. Named after the substance of the same name, Arcángel responded with "El Narcan." Its lyrics claim that Anuel has substance abuse issues. Anuel responded again with a second diss track "Arcángel Es Chota", a song where he mentions Karol G and Cosculluela, as well as Arcángel's arrest in 2019 for domestic battery. Responding to the singer again through an Instagram post, Anuel claims that nobody noticed that he released his album, Sentimiento, Elegancia y Más Maldad, adding that "[he's] waiting for Bad Bunny to collaborate with him to revive his career." Arcángel released a third diss track titled "3 a 0", where he mentions Anuel's ex-partner Yailin La Más Viral and defends Karol G and Feid.

== Personal life ==
=== Family ===
Arcángel has two children. The first was born while in a relationship with Alejandra Pascual, while the second was born during Arcángel's relationship with Janexsy Figueroa. He is also stepfather to the son of Figueroa and Nicky Jam. Justin Santos, who was Arcángel's brother, died at the age of 21 on November 21, 2021, in a car accident on the Teodoro Moscoso Bridge in Puerto Rico.

=== Legal issues ===
In July 2010, Arcángel was arrested in San Juan, Puerto Rico, for driving under the influence of alcohol and speeding. In February 2012, he was arrested again for something similar, despite refusing to take a field sobriety test. In 2019, Arcángel got into legal trouble for domestic battery and was set to appear in court in June 2020.

== Discography ==
=== Studio albums ===
- El Fenómeno (2008)
- Sentimiento, Elegancia & Maldad (2013)
- Ares (2018)
- Historias de un Capricornio (2019)
- Los Favoritos 2 (2020)
- Los Favoritos 2.5 (2021)
- Sr. Santos (2022)
- Sentimiento, Elegancia y Más Maldad (2023)
- Papi Arca (2024)
- Sr. Santos II Sueños de Grandeza (2025)
- La 8va Maravilla (2026)

== Awards and nominations ==
Award	Year	Nominated work	Category	Result	Ref.
ASCAP Latin Awards	2019	"Zum Zum" (with Daddy Yankee and R.K.M & Ken-Y)	Winning Songs	Won	
ASCAP Latin Awards	2021	"Sigues Con Él" (Remix) (with Sech and Romeo Santos)	Winning Songs	Won	
ASCAP Latin Awards	2024	"La Jumpa" (with Bad Bunny)	Winning Songs	Won	
ASCAP Latin Awards	2025	"ALV" (with Grupo Frontera)	Winning Songs	Won	
Billboard Latin Music Awards	2014	Himself	Latin Rhythm Albums Artist of the Year, Solo	Nominated	
BMI Latin Awards	2022	"Sigues Con Él" (with Sech)	Winning Songs	Won	
BMI Latin Awards	2024	"La Jumpa" (with Bad Bunny)	Winning Songs	Won	
Heat Latin Music Awards	2020	Himself	Best Urban Artist	Nominated	
Heat Latin Music Awards	2020	"Si Se Da" (Remix) (with Myke Towers, Farruko, Sech and Zion)	Best Urban Artist	Nominated	
Heat Latin Music Awards	2021	Himself	Best Urban Artist	Nominated	
Heat Latin Music Awards	2021	Himself	Lifetime Achievement Award	Won	
Heat Latin Music Awards	2021	"La Boca" (with Farina)	Best Collaboration	Nominated	
Heat Latin Music Awards	2022	Himself	Best Urban Artist	Nominated	
Heat Latin Music Awards	2023	Himself	Best Urban Artist	Nominated	
Heat Latin Music Awards	2023	"La Jumpa" (with Bad Bunny)	Best Collaboration	Won	
Heat Latin Music Awards	2024	Himself	Best Male Artist	Nominated	
Heat Latin Music Awards	2024	Himself	Best Urban Artist	Nominated	
Heat Latin Music Awards	2024	"ALV" (with Grupo Frontera)	Best Collaboration	Nominated	
Heat Latin Music Awards	2025	Himself	Best Urban Artist	Nominated	
Heat Latin Music Awards	2026	Himself	Best Urban Artist	Pending	
Heat Latin Music Awards	2026	La 8va Maravilla	Album of the Year	Pending	
Juventud Awards	2009	Himself	Favorite Urban Artist	Nominated	
Juventud Awards	2009	"Por Amar a Ciegas"	My Favorite Video	Nominated	
Juventud Awards	2009	El Fenómeno	CD To Die For	Nominated	
Juventud Awards	2015	"Como Tiene Que Ser"	My Favorite Video	Nominated	
Juventud Awards	2016	Los Favoritos	Lo Tocó Todo	Nominated	
Juventud Awards	2023	Sr. Santos	Best Urban Album – Male	Nominated	
Juventud Awards	2023	"JS4E"	Best Trap Song	Nominated	
Juventud Awards	2023	"Baby Father 2.0" (with Yovngchimi, Myke Towers, Ñengo Flow and Yeruza)	Best Trap Song	Nominated	
Juventud Awards	2024	"ALV" (with Grupo Frontera)	The Perfect Mix	Nominated	
Juventud Awards	2026	La 8va Maravilla	Best Urban Album	Nominated	
Juventud Awards	2026	"Qué Sensación (Remix)" (with Jezzy)	Best Trap Song	Won	
Latin Grammy Awards	2010	"Sentimiento" (with Vico C)	Best Urban Song	Nominated	
Latin Grammy Awards	2022	Los Favoritos 2.5	Best Urban Music Album	Nominated	
Latin Grammy Awards	2023	"La Jumpa" (with Bad Bunny)	Best Urban Fusion/Performance	Nominated	
Latin Grammy Awards	2023	"La Jumpa" (with Bad Bunny)	Best Urban Song	Nominated	
Latin Grammy Awards	2025	"THC"	Best Rap/Hip Hop Song	Nominated	
Latin Grammy Awards	2026	"Gohan y Goku"	Best Rap/Hip Hop Song	Pending	
Lo Nuestro Awards	2010	Himself	Urban Revelation of the Year	Nominated	
Lo Nuestro Awards	2021	"Sigues Con Él" (with Sech)	Urban Song of the Year	Nominated	
Lo Nuestro Awards	2021	"Sigues Con Él" (with Sech)	Urban Collaboration of the Year	Nominated	
Lo Nuestro Awards	2022	Los Favoritos 2.5	Urban Album of the Year	Nominated	
Lo Nuestro Awards	2024	Himself	Male Urban Artist of the Year	Nominated	
Lo Nuestro Awards	2024	"La Jumpa" (with Bad Bunny)	Urban Collaboration of the Year	Nominated	
Lo Nuestro Awards	2026	Himself	Premio Lo Nuestro Urban Icon Award	Honoree	
Lo Nuestro Awards	2026	Himself	Male Urban Artist of the Year	Nominated	
Lo Nuestro Awards	2026	“Flash Foto” (with Neutro Shorty)	Best Urban Trap/Hip-Hop Song of the Year	Nominated	
Lo Nuestro Awards	2026	“Wells Fargo” (with Yandel, Ñengo Flow & De La Ghetto)	Urban Collaboration of the Year	Nominated	
Lo Nuestro Awards	2026	Sr. Santos II Sueños De Grandeza	Urban Album of the Year	Nominated	
MTV Millennial Awards	2023	"La Jumpa" (with Bad Bunny)	Reggaeton Hit	Nominated	
Rolling Stone en Español Awards	2023	"La Jumpa" (with Bad Bunny)	Song of the Year	Nominated	
Soberano Awards	2024	"Mi Condena" (with Chimbala, Wisin and Chris Lebrón)	Collaboration of the Year	Nominated	
Tu Música Urbano Awards	2019	"Zum Zum" (Remix) (with Daddy Yankee, R.K.M & Ken-Y, Natti Natasha and Plan B)	Remix of the Year	Nominated	
Tu Música Urbano Awards	2019	Ares	Album of the Year	Nominated	
Tu Música Urbano Awards	2020	Himself	Lifetime Achievement Award	Won	
Tu Música Urbano Awards	2020	"Si Se Da" (Remix) (with Myke Towers, Farruko, Sech and Zion)	Remix of the Year - New Generation	Nominated	
Tu Música Urbano Awards	2020	"105F" (Remix) (with Kevvo, Farruko, Myke Towers, Ñengo Flow, Brytiago and Chencho Corleone)	Remix of the Year - New Generation	Nominated	
Tu Música Urbano Awards	2023	Himself	Top Artist - Male	Nominated	
Tu Música Urbano Awards	2023	Himself	Dedication Award	Won	
Tu Música Urbano Awards	2023	"La Jumpa" (with Bad Bunny)	Collaboration of the Year	Nominated	
Tu Música Urbano Awards	2023	"JS4E"	Top Song - Trap	Nominated	
Tu Música Urbano Awards	2023	"JS4E"	Video of the Year	Won	
Tu Música Urbano Awards	2023	Sr. Santos	Album of the Year – Male Artist	Nominated	
