= Jukebox musical =

Musical compiled from existing songs

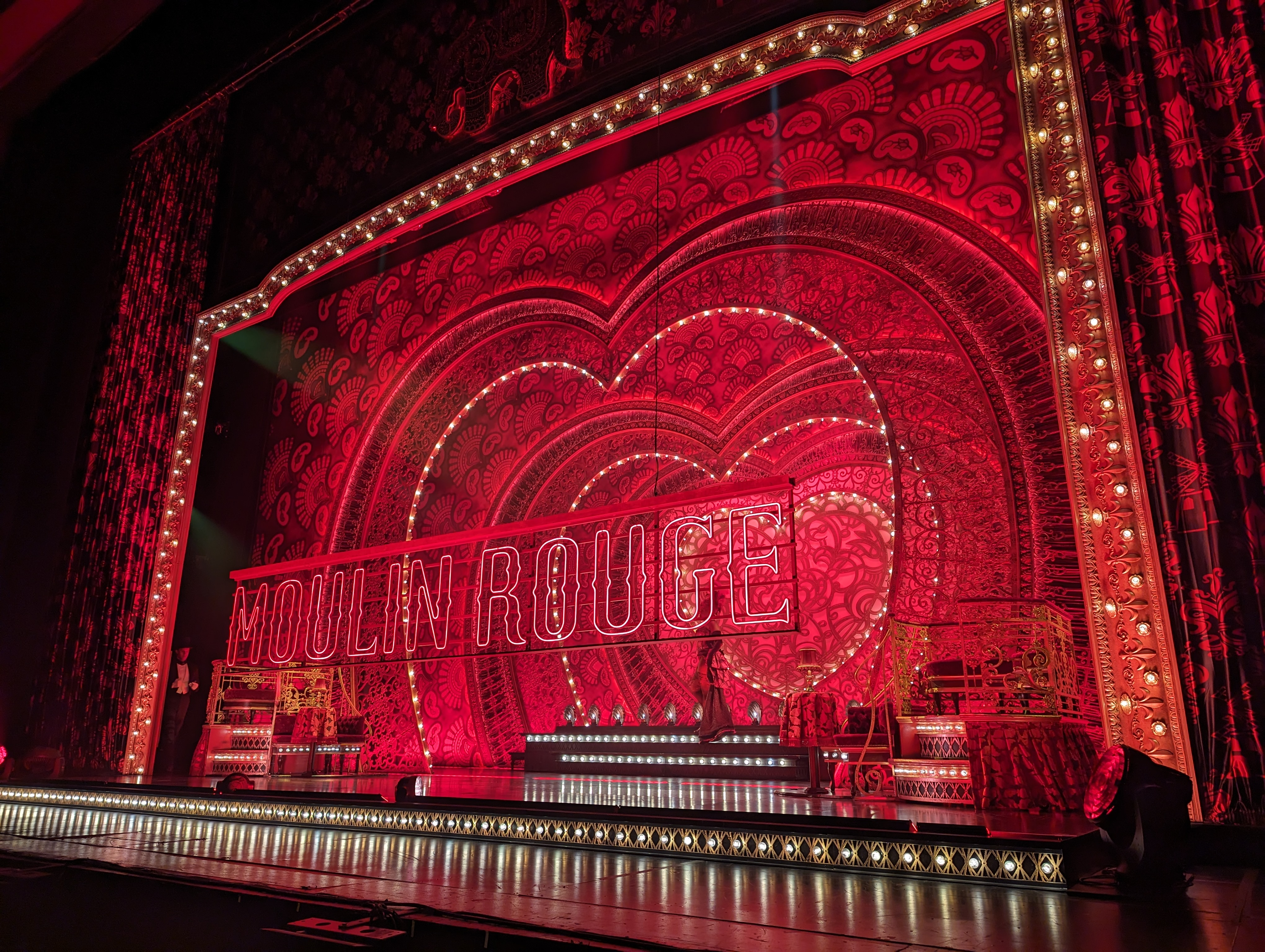
Moulin Rouge!, a jukebox musical, at the Kennedy Center in Washington, D.C.

A jukebox musical is a stage musical or musical film wherein most of its featured songs are already well known in popular music, rather than part of an original score.

Some jukebox musicals use a wide variety of songs, while others confine themselves to songs previously performed by one singer or band, or written by one songwriter. In the latter cases, the plot is often a biography of the artist or artists, fictionalized to some degree. In other jukebox musicals, the plot is purely fictional. For musicals about a musician or musical act, some of the songs can be diegetic, meaning that they are performed within the world of the play or film. Works in which all of the music is diegetic, however, such as a biographical film about a singer who is at times shown performing their songs, are generally not considered jukebox musicals.

Revues that lack a plot are also usually not described as jukebox musicals, although plotless shows that include a dance element sometimes are.

== History ==
In Europe in the 17th and 18th century, many comic operas were produced that parodied popular songs of the time by performing them with modified lyrics. Comédie en vaudevilles and ballad operas are two genres that made heavy use of well-known melodies. The Beggar's Opera (1728), the first ballad opera and the most famous, has been called "the original jukebox musical".

Films considered early examples of jukebox musicals include An American in Paris (1951), Singin' in the Rain (1952), Rock, Rock, Rock (1956) and Rock Around the Clock (1956).

The songwriting team of Robert Wright and George Forrest pioneered the concept of musicals whose songs are derived from one composer's instrumental works, with newly-written lyrics. Some of these musicals also told the life story of that composer. Musicals and operettas that they produced in this fashion include Song of Norway (1944, using the music of Edvard Grieg), Magdalena: a Musical Adventure (1948, music of Heitor Villa-Lobos), a 1949 reworking of the 1934 musical The Great Waltz (music of Johann Strauss I and Johann Strauss II), Kismet (1953, music of Alexander Borodin), and Anya (1965, music of Sergei Rachmaninoff).

The origin of the phrase "jukebox musical" in its current meaning is unclear. The word "jukebox" dates to around 1939. The first documented use of "jukebox musical" in print may have been in a 1962 description of the musical Do Re Mi, but that was a musical (with original music) about a man who sells jukeboxes. In a 1964 review of the Beatles film A Hard Day's Night, critic Andrew Sarris described that film as "the Citizen Kane of jukebox musicals", but he too may have had a meaning in mind other than the contemporary one, since most of that film's songs were original.

Although jukebox musicals had achieved success for years (for example, the 1989 musical Buddy: The Buddy Holly Story), a surge in popularity was led by the success of Mamma Mia! (1999), built around the music of ABBA. The biographical musical, a subset of the jukebox musical in which an artist's or band's own songs form the basis of a musical based on their life story, received a surge in popularity in the early 2000s with All Shook Up (about Elvis Presley) and Jersey Boys (commissioned by and about The Four Seasons), as well as The Boy from Oz (about Peter Allen).

== Types of jukebox musicals ==
The most common format for jukebox musicals is a show that tells the life story of a famous musician or musical group, while incorporating songs from throughout their career. Artists whose life and songs have served as the basis for a jukebox musical include Elvis Presley, Michael Jackson, John Lennon, Freddie Mercury, Susan Boyle, (twice) Shlomo Carlebach, Ritchie Valens, Johnny Cash, Cher, Patsy Cline, Bobby Darin (twice), The Drifters, Emilio and Gloria Estefan, Buddy Holly, Janis Joplin, Carole King, The Kinks, Fela Kuti, Udo Lindenberg, Bob Marley (twice), Johnny O'Keefe, The Seekers, Dusty Springfield (twice), Donna Summer, The Temptations, Robbie Williams, Tina Turner (twice), Frankie Valli and The Four Seasons, Peter Allen, Hank Williams, Neil Diamond, and ABBA. Others who have gotten similar treatment include songwriter/producers Bert Berns, Berry Gordy and Ellie Greenwich, record producer Florence Greenberg, and composer/songwriter Norbert Glanzberg.

For jukebox musicals with a fictional plot, one common approach is to center the plot around one or more (fictional) singers or musicians, thus letting some of the songs be performed as songs within the show. Examples of such musicals include Boogie Nights (1998), Mamma Mia! (1999), We Will Rock You (2002), Hoy no me puedo levantar (2005), Bésame mucho, el musical (2005), Rock of Ages (2005), Daddy Cool (2006), Never Forget (2007), Viva Forever! (2012), All Out of Love (2018), and Jukebox Hero (2018).

Some jukebox musicals are adaptations of a film, in which songs from the film's soundtrack are now sung by the characters; examples include Saturday Night Fever (1998), Priscilla, Queen of the Desert (2006), Cruel Intentions: The '90s Musical (2015) and My Best Friend's Wedding (2024).

Some shows and films combine original and previously released songs; it may be a matter of opinion whether these qualify as jukebox musicals. For example, the stage musicals 42nd Street (1980), Five Guys Named Moe (1990), Crazy for You (1992), and Xanadu (2007) are all adaptations of earlier source material that added to the original score other well-known songs written by the original songwriters. The stage musicals The Last Ship (2014) and Standing at the Sky's Edge (2019) and film musicals Yellow Submarine (1968) and Idlewild (2006) are all musicals that combine original and previously recorded songs by a single artist or group. Other films that combine old and original songs include Singin' in the Rain (1952), Trolls (2016), and Cinderella (2021).

== List of stage jukebox musicals ==
=== 1970s ===
Year	Title	Based on the music of
1976	Bubbling Brown Sugar	Duke Ellington, Count Basie, Cab Calloway, et al.
1977	Beatlemania	The Beatles
1977	Elvis	Elvis Presley
1978	Ain't Misbehavin'	Fats Waller
1978	Eubie!	Eubie Blake

=== 1980s ===
Year	Title	Based on the music of
1980	42nd Street	Al Dubin, Johnny Mercer, and Harry Warren
1983	Abbacadabra	ABBA
1984	Leader of the Pack	Ellie Greenwich, Jeff Barry, and Phil Spector
1986	Big Deal	Popular songs from the 1920s and 30s
1987	Hank Williams: Lost Highway	Hank Williams
1989	Buddy: The Buddy Holly Story	Buddy Holly, including many early rock "standards"
1989	Forever Plaid	Popular songs from the 1950s
1989	Return to the Forbidden Planet	1960s rock and roll

=== 1990s ===
Year	Title	Based on the music of
1990	Five Guys Named Moe	Louis Jordan
1992	Crazy for you	George Gershwin & Ira Gershwin
1992	Jelly's Last Jam	Jelly Roll Morton
1993	The Who's Tommy	The Who
1996	Summer Holiday	Cliff Richard & The Shadows
1997	Boogie Nights	The 1970s
1998	Saturday Night Fever	Bee Gees and others
1999	Disco Inferno	1970s disco
1999	Mamma Mia!	ABBA
1999	The Marvelous Wonderettes	Female vocal harmony groups of the 1950s and 1960s

=== 2000s ===
Year	Title	Based on the music of
2001	Love, Janis	Janis Joplin
2001	Shout! The Legend of The Wild One	Johnny O'Keefe
2002	We Will Rock You	Queen
2002	Our House	Madness
2002	Movin' Out	Billy Joel
2003	The Boy from Oz	Peter Allen
2003	Tonight's the Night	Rod Stewart
2003	Belles belles belles	Claude François
2004	On the Record	The Walt Disney Company
2005	Back to the 80's!	Various 80s pop artists
2005	Lennon	John Lennon
2005	Good Vibrations	The Beach Boys
2005	All Shook Up	Elvis Presley
2005	Jersey Boys	Frankie Valli and Four Seasons
2005	Hoy no me puedo levantar	Spanish group Mecano
2005	Bésame mucho, el musical	Mexican and Cuban bolero songs
2006	Dusty – The Original Pop Diva	Dusty Springfield
2006	Hot Feet	Earth, Wind & Fire
2006	Priscilla, Queen of the Desert	Various artists, based on the movie The Adventures of Priscilla, Queen of the Desert
2006	Daddy Cool	Frank Farian
2006	Ring of Fire	Johnny Cash
2006	Rock of Ages	Glam metal of the 1980s
2006	The Times They Are a-Changin'	Bob Dylan
2006	The Onion Cellar	The Dresden Dolls
2007	Desperately Seeking Susan	Blondie
2007	Never Forget	Take That
2007	Ich war noch niemals in New York	Udo Jürgens
2007	Xanadu	Electric Light Orchestra and Olivia Newton-John
2007	Sunshine on Leith	The Proclaimers
2007	The Slide	The Beautiful South
2008	All the Fun of the Fair	David Essex
2008	Je m'voyais déjà : Le musical	Charles Aznavour
2009	Dreamboats and Petticoats	Compilation album of songs from the 1950s and early 1960s
2009	Mentiras, el musical	Mexican songs from the 1980s
2009	Fela!	Fela Kuti
2009	Life Could Be a Dream	Doo-wop music circa 1960
2009	American Idiot	Green Day, based on the album of the same name

=== 2010s ===
Year	Title	Based on the music of
2010	Perfect Harmony	Various artists (ranging from The Jackson 5, to Pat Benatar)
2010	Everyday Rapture	Various artists (ranging from Judy Garland and The Supremes, to Mr. Rogers)
2010	Rain: A Tribute to the Beatles	The Beatles
2010	Come Fly Away	Frank Sinatra
2010	Million Dollar Quartet	Elvis Presley, Jerry Lee Lewis, Carl Perkins, and Johnny Cash
2010	Padam Padam : Le spectacle musical	Norbert Glanzberg
2011	Baby It's You!	Popular songs from the 1960s produced by Florence Greenberg
2011	Si nos dejan	Mexican songs from the 1930s to 1950s
2011	Hinterm Horizont	Udo Lindenberg
2012	The Bodyguard	Whitney Houston
2012	I Dreamed a Dream	Susan Boyle
2012	Raiding the Rock Vault	Various classic rock songs
2012	Viva Forever!	Spice Girls
2012	Soul Sister	Tina Turner
2012	Let it Be	The Beatles
2012	Disaster!	Popular songs from the 1970s
2012	Yoshimi Battles the Pink Robots	The Flaming Lips
2013	A Night with Janis Joplin	Janis Joplin
2013	Beautiful: The Carole King Musical	Carole King
2013	Soul Doctor	Shlomo Carlebach and Nina Simone
2013	Motown: The Musical	Motown
2014	Bullets Over Broadway	Popular songs from the 1910s and 20s, based on the film Bullets Over Broadway
2014	Holler If Ya Hear Me	Tupac Shakur
2014	Cyrano de BurgerShack	Various artists including Carly Rae Jepsen and Smash Mouth
2014	Sunny Afternoon	The Kinks
2014	Lady Day at Emerson's Bar and Grill	Billie Holiday
2014	Piece of My Heart: The Bert Berns Story	Bert Berns
2015	On Your Feet!	Emilio Estefan and Gloria Estefan
2015	One Love: The Bob Marley Musical	Bob Marley
2015	Résiste	France Gall
2015	Cruel Intentions: The '90s Musical	Popular songs from the 1990s, based on the movie Cruel Intentions
2015	Georgy Girl	The Seekers and other popular songs of the 1960s
2016	Lazarus	David Bowie
2016	Dream Lover: The Bobby Darin Musical	Bobby Darin
2017	The Band	Take That
2017	Noites de Verão	Britney Spears, based on the play A Midsummer Night's Dream
2017	Part of the Plan	Dan Fogelberg
2017	Girl from the North Country	Bob Dylan
2017	Summer: The Donna Summer Musical	Donna Summer
2017	I Am from Austria	Rainhard Fendrich
2017	Bat Out of Hell: The Musical	Jim Steinman
2017	The Choir of Man	Various artists
2018	Dusty – The Dusty Springfield Musical	Dusty Springfield
2018	Jukebox Hero	Foreigner
2018	Escape to Margaritaville	Jimmy Buffett
2018	Ang Huling El Bimbo	Eraserheads
2018	Tina	Tina Turner
2018	Jagged Little Pill	Alanis Morissette
2018	The Heart of Rock and Roll	Huey Lewis and the News
2018	Head over Heels	The Go-Go's
2018	The Cher Show	Cher
2018	Clueless	Popular songs from the 1990s, based on the movie Clueless
2018	All Out of Love	Air Supply
2018	Ain't Too Proud	The Temptations
2018	Moulin Rouge!	Various artists
2019	Club Tropicana	Various artists from the 1980s
2019	Standing at the Sky's Edge	Richard Hawley
2019	Madea's Farewell	Various artists
2019	& Juliet	Max Martin

=== 2020s ===
Year	Title	Based on the music of
2020	POP- Uma Volta no Tempo	Popular songs from girl groups and boy bands
2021	The Drifters Girl	The Drifters
2021	Once Upon a One More Time	Britney Spears
2021	Get Up, Stand Up! The Bob Marley Musical	Bob Marley
2021	What's New Pussycat?	Tom Jones
2021	Je vais t'aimer	Michel Sardou
2021	A Wonderful World	Louis Armstrong
2021	MJ the Musical	Michael Jackson
2022	A Beautiful Noise	Neil Diamond
2022	The Osmonds	The Osmonds
2022	Slanted! Enchanted! A Pavement Musical	Pavement
2023	In Dreams	Roy Orbison
2023	Holidays	Madonna
2023	Hell's Kitchen	Alicia Keys
2023	Buena Vista Social Club	Buena Vista Social Club
2024	Just for One Day	Live Aid
2024	Joyride The Musical	Roxette
2024	Here & Now	Steps
2024	Swept Away	The Avett Brothers
2024	My Best Friend's Wedding	Burt Bacharach and Hal David, based on the film My Best Friend's Wedding
2025	A Knight's Tale	Popular songs from rock and pop artists, based on the film A Knight's Tale
2025	Just In Time	Bobby Darin
2025	The Diana Mixtape	Pop songs from various artists
2025	Dolly: A True Original Musical	Dolly Parton
2026	Titanique	Celine Dion
2026	A History of Public Relations Dilemmae	The Blasting Company

== List of jukebox musical films ==
- Yankee Doodle Dandy (1942), a picture dealing with the life of playwright and composer George M. Cohan, and featuring many of his songs, which were among the most popular songs of their day (late 19th century – early 20th century).
- Meet Me in St. Louis (1945), featuring mostly popular songs from the earlier 20th century and three new songs written for Judy Garland.
- Till the Clouds Roll By (1946), a biopic of composer Jerome Kern, featuring his songs.
- Words and Music (1948), a biopic of composer Richard Rodgers and lyricist Lorenz Hart, featuring their songs.
- Easter Parade (1948), featuring a collection of songs by Irving Berlin.
- One Sunday Afternoon (1948), featuring popular songs from the earlier 20th century.
- Three Little Words (1950), a biopic of composer Harry Ruby and lyricist Bert Kalmar, featuring their songs.
- Painting the Clouds with Sunshine (1951), featuring popular songs from the 1910s to 1930s.
- An American in Paris (1951), a fictionalized story based around George Gershwin's "An American in Paris" suite. The score consists entirely of George and Ira Gershwin pieces, with "American in Paris" being a recurring theme.
- Singin' in the Rain (1952), featuring popular songs from the 1920s and '30s and songs by Arthur Freed, with the exception of two numbers ("Make 'Em Laugh" and "Moses Supposes")
- The Band Wagon (1953) shared a title with the 1931 Broadway musical revue, but used only three songs from the show. It featured an entirely new book by Betty Comden and Adolph Green, written to showcase the Howard Dietz–Arthur Schwartz songbook, including songs from Between the Devil, Flying Colors, and others. The duo wrote the song "That's Entertainment!" specifically for the film.
- Deep in My Heart (1954), a biopic of operetta composer Sigmund Romberg, featuring his songs.
- Love Me or Leave Me (1955), featuring popular songs from the 1930s by Ruth Etting.
- Rock Around the Clock (1956), the first rock-and-roll movie musical, featuring the commercial recordings of Bill Haley and His Comets and The Platters.
- Don't Knock the Rock (1957), another Bill Haley jukebox musical, with the commercial recordings of Haley, Little Richard, and The Treniers.
- Hootenanny Hoot (1963), a low-budget MGM picture intended to capitalize on the folk music craze then sweeping America, featuring on-screen performances by Johnny Cash, Judy Henske, and several other folk music artists.
- Yellow Submarine (1968), based on the songs of The Beatles.
- Son of Dracula (1974), featuring songs from Harry Nilsson's albums Nilsson Schmilsson and Son of Schmilsson.
- At Long Last Love (1975), based on the songs of Cole Porter.
- All That Jazz (1979), featuring popular music from the earlier 20th century.
- Rock 'n' Roll High School (1979), featuring music from the punk rock group Ramones.
- Can't Stop the Music (1980), featuring contemporary disco songs.
- The Blues Brothers (1980), featuring various popular rhythm & blues songs.
- American Pop (1981), featuring American popular music ranging from the 1900s to the present (at the time of the film's release).
- Everyone Says I Love You (1996), featuring popular music from the earlier 20th century.
- Blues Brothers 2000 (1998), featuring various popular rhythm & blues songs.
- Love's Labour's Lost (2000), featuring classic Broadway songs of the 1930s.
- Shrek (2001), featuring pop songs as well as oldies, and ending with the characters performing the Smash Mouth cover of "I'm a Believer" by the Monkees.
- Moulin Rouge! (2001), featuring a variety of pop songs from various decades.
- Interstella 5555: The 5tory of the 5ecret 5tar 5ystem (2003), featuring songs by Daft Punk
- 20 centímetros (2005), various artists, featuring a variety of pop songs from various decades.
- Happy Feet (2006), featuring a variety of pop songs from various decades.
- Idlewild (2006), featuring the songs of OutKast.
- Romance & Cigarettes (2006), featuring mostly love themed pop-songs from the 1950s through '70s.
- Across the Universe (2007), featuring the songs of The Beatles.
- Stilyagi (2008), featuring Soviet rock songs from the 1970s and '80s.
- Mamma Mia! (2008), based on the musical Mamma Mia!, which is based on the songs of ABBA.
- Happy Feet Two (2011), featuring a variety of pop songs from various decades.
- Toi, moi, les autres (2011), featuring a variety of French songs.
- Rock of Ages (2012), featuring hard rock and metal songs of the 1980s, and is based on the stage musical of the same name.
- Lovestruck: The Musical (2013), featuring various pop and dance songs of the 1980s through present.
- Sunshine on Leith (2013), based on the musical Sunshine on Leith, which is based on the songs of The Proclaimers.
- Jersey Boys (2014), based on the musical Jersey Boys, which is based on the music of The Four Seasons.
- The Book of Life (2014), featuring various pop songs.
- Walking on Sunshine (2014), featuring pop songs from the 1980s.
- Strange Magic (2015), featuring various genres and various artists.
- Trolls (2016), featuring various genres and various artists.
- Sing (2016), featuring various genres and various artists.
- Bohemian Rhapsody (2018),
- Mamma Mia! Here We Go Again (2018), sequel to the first film based on the musical Mamma Mia!, which is based on the songs of ABBA.
- A Piece of My Heart (2019), based on the songs of Tomas Ledin.
- Yesterday (2019), featuring songs of The Beatles.
- Valley Girl (2020), featuring pop-songs from the 1980s.
- My Heart Goes Boom! (2020), based on the songs of Raffaella Carrà.
- Trolls World Tour (2020), featuring various genres and various artists.
- Cinderella (2021), featuring various genres and various artists.
- Sing 2 (2021), featuring various genres and various artists.
- Voy a pasármelo bien (2022), featuring songs of Hombres G.
- Greatest Days (2023), based on the stage musical The Band, which is based on the songs of Take That.
- Trolls Band Together (2023), featuring various genres and various artists.
- Joker: Folie à Deux (2024), featuring mostly pre-existing songs and one original song by Lady Gaga
- A Complete Unknown (2024), featuring the songs of Bob Dylan.
- Pavements (2024), a documentary film incorporating moments from Slanted! Enchanted! A Pavement Musical, a jukebox musical using Pavement's music.
- Better Man (2024), featuring the songs of Robbie Williams.
- Piece by Piece (2024), featuring songs produced and composed by Pharrell Williams. Also features songs from various genres and artists.
- Leave One Day (2025), featuring various genres and various artists.
- Springsteen: Deliver Me from Nowhere (2025), biopic featuring songs by American musician Bruce Springsteen.

== List of jukebox musical TV shows ==
- Kids Incorporated (1984–1994), featuring various genres and various artists.
- Kidd Video (1984–1985), featuring various genres and various artists.
- Lipstick on Your Collar (1993), featuring various artists from 1920 to 1960.
- Blackpool (2004), featuring various genres and various artists.
- Elvis (2005), based on the life and music of Elvis Presley.
- Viva Laughlin (2007), featuring various genres and various artists.
- Glee (2009–2015), featuring various genres and various artists.
- The Kitchen Musical (2011), featuring various pop songs.
- Smash (2012–2013), which alternates between previously recorded material and original songs.
- Beat Bugs (2016–2018), which uses different Beatles songs.
- Motown Magic (2018–2019), which uses different Motown songs.
- Soundtrack (2019–2020), featuring various genres and various artists.
- Zoey's Extraordinary Playlist (2020–21), featuring various pop songs.

== Works based on concept albums ==
In a different category are films or stage musicals based around a concept album, in which the story being told is not original but rather a fleshed-out version of the narrative already contained in the album. Examples include:

- The 1974 musical Sgt. Pepper's Lonely Hearts Club Band on the Road, based on the 1967 album Sgt. Pepper's Lonely Hearts Club Band by The Beatles
- The 1975 film Tommy, based on the 1969 album Tommy by The Who
- The 1978 film Sgt. Pepper's Lonely Hearts Club Band, loosely based on Sgt. Pepper's Lonely Hearts Club Band on the Road, although it incorporates songs from some of the Beatles' other albums as well
- The 1982 film Pink Floyd – The Wall, based on the 1979 album The Wall by Pink Floyd
- The 1992 musical The Who's Tommy, also based on the album Tommy
- The 2010 musical American Idiot, based on the 2004 album American Idiot by Green Day
- The 2023 musical Illinoise, based on Illinois by Sufjan Stevens

== See also ==
- List of highest-grossing musical films
- List of highest-grossing musical theatre productions
