= Bésame mucho, el musical =

- Music: Various
- Lyrics: Various
- Book: Consuelo Garrido; Lorena Maza; Victor Weinstock
- Basis: Bolero songs from the 20s to 70's

Bésame mucho, el musical is a jukebox musical with a book written by Consuelo Garrido, Lorena Maza, and Victor Weinstock. The music, arranged by José María Vitier, features Bolero hit songs from the 1920s to the 1980s. It was the first original musical created by OCESA Teatro, Mexican leader in musical theatre.

== History ==
After successfully presenting ten different Broadway shows in Mexico, OCESA decided to produce their first original musical. A jukebox musical seemed to be the answer, since they were becoming increasingly popular and successful. Timbiriche (a very famous 1980s band in Mexico) was a first choice, but the idea was not appealing enough for older audiences. Another idea was to use Bolero songs from the early 20th century, which are still very popular in Mexico, but again this idea was not good to bring to young audiences, so Federico Gonzalez Compeán decided to work with Consuelo Garrido, Lorena Maza and Victor Weinstock to create a musical with two stories, one of two lovers in the 21st century and one with a young couple in the early 1920s.

== Synopsis ==
The musical is set in two different times and places: Mexico City in 2005, and Cuba in the 1920s.

In 2005 a pianist named Hugo falls in love with Elena, the granddaughter of his neighbor Caridad. Caridad is teaching Elena to sing Boleros for an annual Bolero competition and we learn that when she was younger she was a great singer herself.

We go back in time to Cuba, when Caridad leaves with her father for Yucatán, where she meets Felipe, a young musician. They fall madly in love and decide to run away together, but Caridad's father stops her and they go back to Cuba.

Back in 2005 Caridad warns Elena to stay away from Hugo, who reminds her of Felipe.

Back in the past Caridad is now a great singer at a nightclub in Mexico City, and one night Felipe, now a very famous musician, goes to the club and finds Caridad. The two are reunited but soon Caridad finds out he is married and runs away heartbroken.

Meanwhile, Hugo is trapped in a love triangle between an office colleague and Elena. He decides to break up with his colleague and starts going out with Elena. One day Elena finds Hugo's colleague at his house and is enraged by this. She wins the bolero contest and leaves to Cuba for the finals, leaving Hugo behind.

In the 1950s Caridad is back in Cuba at a concert where she finds Felipe who is now divorced. They are together again but suddenly a fight is started at the club and Felipe dies in Caridad's arms.

Hugo decides to go to Cuba to find Elena and, in a fight recalling that of Felipe, is almost killed. The two return to Mexico City with Caridad, who gives them her blessing.

== Song list ==
Act One

- Quiereme Mucho
- Presentimiento
- Lagrimas Negras
- Son de la Loma
- Nunca
- Impossible
- Capullito de Alheli
- Vereda Tropical
- Aquellos Ojos Verdes
- Negra Consentida
- Amar y Vivir
- Frenesi

Act Two

- Besame Mucho
- Nosotros
- Cuando Vuelava a Tu Lado
- No Me Platiques Mas
- Como Fue
- Obsession
- Contigo en La Distancia
- La Puerta
- La Mentira
- Esta Tarde Vi Llover
- Piel Canela
