= OCESA Seitrack =

Mexican record label

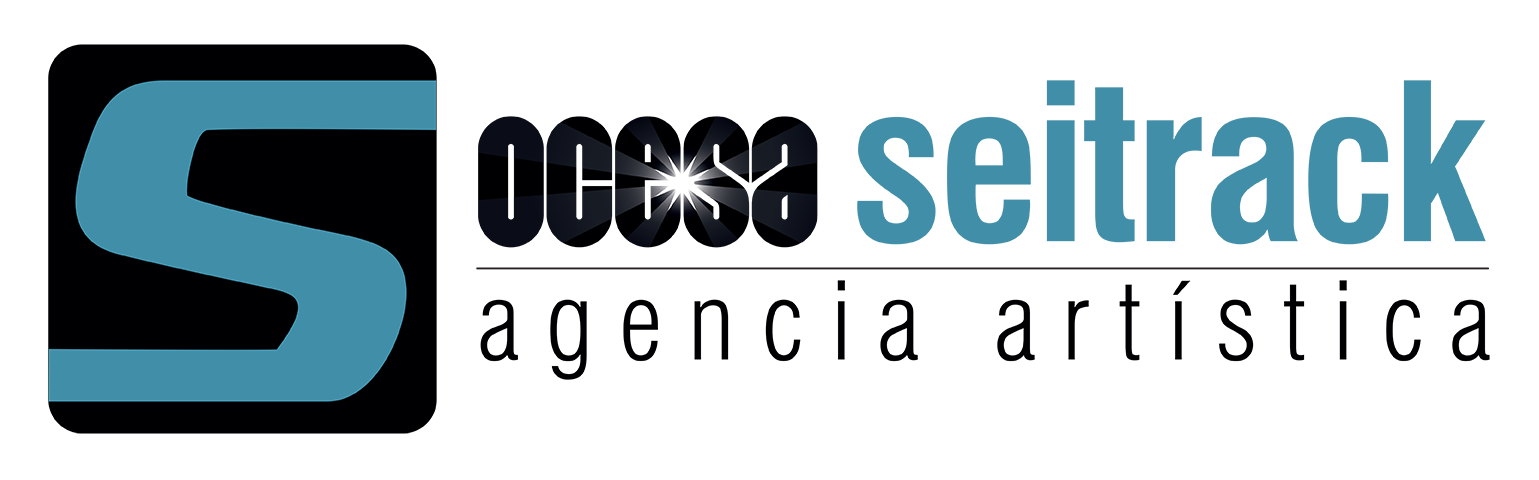
- Parent company: Grupo CIE (OCESA Entertainment)
- Founded: 2002 (as Seitrack Management)
- Genre: Latin pop; rock; regional Mexican
- Country of origin: Mexico
- Location: Mexico City
- Official website: www.seitrack.mx

OCESA Seitrack (formerly Seitrack Management and Seitrack Música) is a Mexican entertainment company established in 2002, owned by Grupo CIE through its OCESA subsidiary. The company operates as a record label, music publisher and talent agency.

== History ==
Seitrack Management was an independent private talent agency founded in 2002, originally as just a talent agency. OCESA Entertainment, a division of Grupo CIE, joined forces with Seitrack, formally changing the latter's name to OCESA-Seitrack.

== Officials ==
- Alex Mizrahi (CEO)
- Octavio Padilla (General Director)
- Roberto Rodríguez, Yolo Aguilar, Teresa González de la Concha (Marketing Subdirectors)
- Javier Montemayor (Sales Subdirector)
- Miguel Angel Ruiz (Sales Subdirector)
- Mariana Gonzalez (Commercial Alliances Subdirector)
- Enrique García-Salgado (Digital Strategies Subdirector)
- Carlos Moreno, Francisco Sierra, Renato Francis, Layla Del Razo, Fernando de la Garza (Marketing Managers)
- Marisol Márquez (Administrative Manager)
- Gisa Montalvo (Sales Manager)

== Artists ==
Personal:

=== Recording ===
- Ana Torroja
- María José
- Ximena Sariñana

=== Management ===
- Alejandro Fernández
- Ana Torroja
- Bronco
- Christian Nodal
- Edith Márquez
- Ha*Ash
- Horacio Palencia
- Karla Vallín
- Karol Sevilla
- Kinky
- Los Ángeles Azules
- María Jose
- María Leon
- Miguel Bosé
- Moenia
- Morat
- Paty Cantú
- Río Roma
- Sandra Echeverría
- Trapical Minds
- Ximena Sariñana
- Yahir
- Yuridia
- Zoé

== See also ==
- Grupo CIE
- List of record labels
