= Sr. Santos =

2022 studio album by Arcángel

Studio album by Arcángel
- Released: December 1, 2022
- Genre: Latin trap; Latin R&B; drill; hip house
- Length: 58:01
- Language: Spanish
- Label: Rimas

Arcángel chronology
Los Favoritos 2.5 (2021)	Sr. Santos (2022)	Sentimiento, Elegancia y Más Maldad (2023)

Singles from Sr. Santos
- 1. "JS4E" Released: November 21, 2022; 2. "La Jumpa" Released: November 30, 2022; 3. "La Ruta" Released: December 2, 2022; 4. "No Te Vayas" Released: December 24, 2022; 5. "Kame Hame" Released: January 27, 2023; 6. "PortoBello" Released: March 2, 2023

Sr. Santos is the seventh studio album by American rapper and singer Arcángel. It was released on December 1, 2022, through Rimas Entertainment. It contains collaborations with Bad Bunny, Duki, Bizarrap, Myke Towers, Bryant Myers, Eladio Carrión, Young Miko, De la Ghetto and Almighty, among others. A Latin trap album, it is dedicated to the rapper's brother, Justin Santos, who died in 2021, with its lead single "JS4E" being its main tribute track. It was also supported by its second single "La Jumpa", with the album debuting at number 37 on the US Billboard 200.

== Background and singles ==
Arcángel told Billboard Español that he had plans release an EP in November 2021, but would eventually be scrapped after hearing about the death of his brother, Justin Santos, who died in a car accident at the Teodoro Moscoso Bridge. A year after his death, Arcángel and his mother, Carmen Rosas, visited the bridge and designated it a new name, the Justin Santos Bridge. He released "JS4E" as a tribute, on November 21, 2022, along with its accompanying music video. He announced Sr. Santos in late November 2022, with the addition of the single "La Jumpa" with fellow collaborator Bad Bunny; the former was stated to be dedicated to his brother.

== Release and promotion ==
In the United States, Sr. Santos debuted at number 37 on the Billboard 200 with 19,000 album-equivalent units. In addition, it also debuted at number three on the Top Latin Albums and number two on the Latin Rhythm Albums chart. It was also named as one of the best Latin music albums of 2022 by Billboard. He also embarked the Just in Time Tour to support the album, which began on August 26, 2023, in Chicago, and ended on October 1, 2023, in Orlando, Florida.

== Track listing ==
Sr. Santos track listing
No.	Title	Length
1.	"JS4E"	3:58
2.	"PortoBello"	3:46
3.	"La Jumpa" (with Bad Bunny)	4:16
4.	"La Roca"	2:56
5.	"Bottas" (with Duki and Bizarrap)	3:29
6.	"Subimos de Precio"	2:23
7.	"Digitos" (with Myke Towers)	3:17
8.	"No Te Vayas"	1:40
9.	"La Ruta" (with Yovngchimi)	3:04
10.	"Spicy Crab" (with Bryant Myers)	3:17
11.	"Papa Noel" (with Eladio Carrión)	3:35
12.	"Kilimanjaro" (with Young Miko)	3:38
13.	"Sprinter"	3:10
14.	"De Negro" (with Diem BB)	3:00
15.	"Entonces" (with De la Ghetto)	3:09
16.	"Fendace" (with Almighty)	2:57
17.	"Sin Scotti" (with Chucky73, Jim Jones, Dowba Montana and Young Flow)	4:58
18.	"MMB's"	1:28
Total length:		58:01

== Charts ==
=== Weekly charts ===
Weekly chart performance for Sr. Santos
Chart (2022)	Peak position
Spanish Albums (Promusicae)	10
US Billboard 200	37
US Independent Albums (Billboard)	4
US Latin Rhythm Albums (Billboard)	2
US Top Latin Albums (Billboard)	3

=== Year-end charts ===
Year-end chart performance for Sr. Santos
Chart (2023)	Position
US Latin Rhythm Albums (Billboard)	18
US Top Latin Albums (Billboard)	31
