= Pa' Que la Pases Bien =

2008 single by Arcángel

Single by Arcángel

from the album El Fenómeno
- Released: February 2008
- Recorded: 2007
- Genre: Reggaeton; EDM; R&B
- Length: 3:36
- Label: Universal; Baby; Flow Factory
- Songwriter: Austin Santos
- Producers: Tainy; Hyde "El Verdadero Quimico"

Arcángel singles chronology
"Aparentemente" (2007)	"Pa' Que la Pases Bien" (2008)	"Historia de Amor" (2008)

"Pa' Que la Pases Bien" (English: "So That You Have a Good Time") is a single by American reggaeton artist Arcángel released in February 2008, from his first compilation album El Fenomeno, released on December 9, 2008.

When the album was almost completed, some of the tracks from the album were leaked onto the internet. It was at that point that Arcángel decided to distribute the album free of charge, via download. "Pa' Que la Pases Bien" was included.

Although the single was distributed for free, the song was still able to peak at number 32 on the Billboard Latin Rhythm Airplay chart, primarily owing to heavy radio play.

== Charts ==
Chart	Peak position
U.S. Billboard Latin Rhythm Airplay	32
U.S. Billboard Latin Tropical Airplay	30
U.S. Billboard Hot Latin Songs	43
