= Sentimiento, Elegancia y Más Maldad =

Studio album by Arcángel
- Released: November 17, 2023
- Genre: Reggaeton; Latin house; Latin trap; Latin R&B; Mexican cumbia
- Length: 54:25
- Language: Spanish
- Label: Rimas
- Producer: Albert Hype; BK; Botlok; Dímelo Flow; D-Note; Edge; Hake; John El Diver; J Melodiez; Jota Rosa; Light GM; Manny Flow Factory; PM Beatz; Predicator; Sir Boss; Taiko; Tainy; Yarzy; Zetto

Arcángel chronology
Sr. Santos (2022)	Sentimiento, Elegancia y Más Maldad (2023)

Singles from Sentimiento, Elegancia y Más Maldad
- 1. "La Chamba" Released: October 30, 2023; 2. "Plutón" Released: November 9, 2023; 3. "Me Gusta Tu Flow" Released: November 16, 2023; 4. "ALV" Released: November 17, 2023

Sentimiento, Elegancia y Más Maldad is the eighth studio album by American singer Arcángel. It was released on November 17, 2023, through Rimas, as a sequel to the singer's second studio album Sentimiento, Elegancia & Maldad (2013).

The album contains collaborations with Grupo Frontera, Quevedo, Rauw Alejandro, De la Ghetto, Jowell & Randy, Peso Pluma, and Feid. Most of the album's production is done by Dímelo Flow, along with Tainy and several co-producers.

== Critical reception ==
Rolling Stone placed Sentimiento, Elegancia y Más Maldad as the 17th best Spanish-language album of 2023, adding that "Arcángel tackles different genres and fusions, often better than the young guns who idolize him."

== Track listing ==
All tracks are written by Austin Santos with additional writers as noted in each track.

Sentimiento, Elegancia y Más Maldad track listing
No.	Title	Writer(s)	Producer(s)	Length
1.	"Glory"	Austin Santos	Flow; BK; Predicador	1:05
2.	"El Palo"	A. Santos	D-Note	3:34
3.	"Me Gusta Tu Flow"	A. Santos; Andrés Jael Correa; Edgar Barrera; Kevyn Mauricio Cruz; Nicolás Jaña Galleguillo	Barrera; Keityn; Taiko	2:57
4.	"Plutón"	A. Santos; Jeremy Santos	BK; Dímelo Flow; Jhon El Diver; Sir Boss	2:25
5.	"ALV" (with Grupo Frontera)	A. Santos; Andy; BK; Dímelo Flow; Barrera; Jhon El Diver; Kemzo	Dímelo Flow; Barrera	3:44
6.	"Antonio Banderas"	A. Santos	D-Note	3:02
7.	"Rosita"	A. Santos; Correa	Dímelo Flow; Bot Lok	2:40
8.	"Los Roques" (with Quevedo)	A. Santos; Pedro Luis Domínguez Quevedo; Ramses Ivan Herrera	Dímelo Flow; Jhon El Diver; BK	2:51
9.	"Psicópata"	A. Santos	D-Note	2:48
10.	"FP" (with Rauw Alejandro)	A. Santos; Raúl Alejandro Ocasio Ruiz; Jeremy Ruiz; Herrera	BK; Dímelo Flow; Sir Boss	2:51
11.	"Qué Tengo Que Hacer"	A. Santos	Dímelo Flow; J Melodiez; Manny Flow; Predicador	2:52
12.	"Condado"	A. Santos; Issac Ortiz	Dímelo Flow; BK	2:31
13.	"Yoshi" (with De la Ghetto and Jowell & Randy)	A. Santos; Joel Muñoz; Randy Ortiz; Rafael Castillo	Dímelo Flow; Yarzy; PM	3:22
14.	"Bali"	A. Santos; J. Santos	Dímelo Flow; Hake; PM	2:48
15.	"La Chamba" (with Peso Pluma)	A. Santos; Hassan Emilio Kabande Laija; Nicole Denise Cucco	Tainy	2:53
16.	"Rápido"	A. Santos	Dímelo Flow; Jhon El Diver; Sir Boss; BK	2:35
17.	"No Tiene Nombre Esta Canción"	A. Santos; Carlos Torrejon; J. Ruiz	Dímelo Flow; Sir Boss; BK	2:54
18.	"Arca 10mil" (with Feid)	A. Santos; Salomón Villada Hoyos; Andres D. Restrepo Echavarria	Jota Rosa; Albert Hype	3:00
19.	"Los Tiempos Cambian"	A. Santos	Light GM	3:25
Total length:				54:25

== Charts ==
Weekly chart performance for Sentimiento, Elegancia y Más Maldad
Chart (2023)	Peak position
Spanish Albums (PROMUSICAE)	13
US Billboard 200	195
US Latin Rhythm Albums (Billboard)	6
US Top Latin Albums (Billboard)	10
