= Ocesa Teatro =

OCESA Teatro is a division of Grupo CIE. It is dedicated to produce and promote theater, especially in Mexico City, being the largest producer in Mexico and Latin America.

== History ==
The theater division of OCESA, part of Grupo CIE (Corporación Interamericana de Entretenimiento), was created in 1997 for the production of stage plays and musicals. The first play produced was Confesiones de Mujeres de 30 and later Disney's Beauty and the Beast. Both plays became a great success and so did OCESA's Theater division. Moving from the Orfeon Theater where Beauty and the Beast was playing, the company was seeking to build or buy their own theaters for large format musicals. In 1999 RENT and The Phantom Of The Opera were simultaneously played at the newly rebuilt Alameda Theaters. In 2000, Telmex bought both theaters to become part of the Centro Cultural Telmex (Telmex Cultural Center) which consists of two theaters, with capacity of 2,254 for Theatre 1 and 1,200 seats for Theatre 2, an art gallery and a small shopping center. An agreement was signed between Telmex and OCESA to let OCESA operate the theaters and present exclusively OCESA productions. OCESA Teatro is nowadays, the biggest producer of dramatic and musical theater in Latin America; producing each year at least two Broadway-style shows and two or three plays. It is associated with companies in Buenos Aires, São Paulo, Madrid, Barcelona and Portugal to help them reduce costs and risks linked with big budget productions and to share them copyrights, music, adaptations, sets or even cast members among the associates. Most productions include well known actors from other media but specially those popularized by television. Their shows are characterized for having very high standards of quality and competition is almost nonexistent.

== Productions ==
=== Musicals ===
Musical	Opening Date	Closing Date	Performances	Spectators	Theater	Notes
Beauty and the Beast	May 1997	June 1998	420	650,000	Orfeon Theatre	
RENT	June 1999	January 2000	220	120,000	Alameda Theatre 2	
The Phantom of the Opera	December 1999	January 2001	400	550,000	Alameda Theatre 1	The most expensive of all productions to date.
Man of la Mancha	April 2000	August 2001	443	220,000	Centro Cultural Telmex Theatre 2	The scenery was completely different from that on Broadway.
Jesus Christ Superstar	March 2001	December 2001	230	130,000	Centro Cultural Telmex Theatre 1	
Chicago	October 2001	September 2002	329	250,000	Centro Cultural Telmex Theatre 2	Bianca Marroquin (Roxie) was invited to do her crossover from Mexico to Broadway in the same leading role for three different seasons, last one with Rap-singer Usher and toured USA and Canada for about three years with Chicago in the same leading role, Roxie Hart.
The Full Monty	March 2002	June 2002	130	70,000	Centro Cultural Telmex Theatre 1	
Les Misérables	November 2002	August 2004	711	850,000	Centro Cultural Telmex Theatre 1	Second longest running musical in this decade in Mexico (Recently surpassed by 'Mentiras, el musical, which opened in 2009).
Joseph and the Amazing Technicolor Dreamcoat	April 2004	May 2005	440	300,000	Centro Cultural Telmex Theatre 2	The translation and scenery were completely different from a previous Mexican production due to a struggle to get the rights from the play. The only production in which Joseph flies.
Fiddler on the Roof	November 2004	March 2006	503	600,000	Centro Cultural Telmex Theatre 1	
Bésame mucho	July 2005	October 2006	512	350,000	Centro Cultural Telmex Theatre 2	OCESA's First Original Production, based on popular Mexican and Cuban boleros.
Selena el Musical	May 2006	August 2006	100	80,000	Blanquita Theatre	OCESA's Second Original Production.
Hoy No Me Puedo Levantar	May 2006	July 2007	425	500,000	Centro Cultural Telmex Theatre 1	Produced in association with DRIVE. Based on Mecano songs and the 80's decade.
The Producers	December 2006	October 2007	360	139,500	Centro Cultural Telmex Theatre 2	Produced in association with Music Theater International (MTI).
Beauty and the Beast (revival)	September 2007	September 2008	414	600,000	Centro Cultural Telmex Theatre 1	This musical revival is the celebration of OCESA Teatro's 10th Anniversary.
Sweet Charity	November 2008	May 2009	198	200,000	Centro Cultural Telmex Theatre 1	The translation and scenery are complete different from other productions to be more fittable to Mexican audience.
Mentiras el musical	February 2009				México Theatre	OCESA's Third Original Production. Based on popular 80's Mexican pop songs.
Mamma Mia!	July 2009	August 2010	400	400,000	Centro Cultural Telmex Theatre 1	
A Chorus Line	November 2010	May 2011	234	192,723	Centro Cultural Telmex Theatre 1	
Peter Pan	July 2011	April 2012	260		Centro Cultural Telmex Theatre 1	
Si Nos Dejan	August 2011	February 2013	550	250,000	Centro Cultural Telmex Theatre 2	OCESA's Fourth Original Production. Based on popular Mexican regional songs.
Mary Poppins	November 2012	August 2013	300	300,000	Centro Cultural Telmex Theatre 1	
Wicked	October 2013	January 18, 2015	464		Telcel Theatre	Starring Mexican teen actress and singer, Danna Paola as Elphaba
Anastasia	August 3, 2023	May 12, 2024	282	210,000	Telcel Theatre	

=== Plays ===
- Confesiones de Mujeres de 30.
- Master Class
- Nosotras Que Nos Queremos Tanto
- The Vagina Monologues
- Las Obras Completas de William Shakespeare Abreviadas
- Defending the Caveman
- Las Viejas Vienen Marchando
- Todos Tenemos Problemas (Sexuales)
- Proof
- No Más Sexo
- Three Tall Women
- La Obra del Bebe
- Black Comedy
- Generacion Atari
- El Método Grönholm
- Orgasmos, la Comedia
- Des-Madres
- Doubt
- Visiting Mr. Green
- Emociones Encontradas
- Chicas Católicas
- Legends!.
- The Diary of Anne Frank
- The Blonde, the Brunette and the Vengeful Redhead
- Same Time, Next Year
- Fat Pig
- August: Osage County
- Almost, Maine
- Sexy Laundry

== Criticism ==
OCESA Teatro has received complains for not offering an equal opportunity casting selection process in many of their productions. Several shows were criticized for casting famous figures in main roles, mostly actors made popular by television, only for their attraction power, even if their appearance notably miscast those roles. Also they have been criticized for creating a pool of main actors that continuously reappear in their shows, closing the doors to upcoming actors and becoming a tightly closed group. OCESA Teatro however considers itself the biggest promoter of new talent in Latin America.

Also OCESA Teatro has received complains about how the company strives to recreate exactly the Broadway experience in most of their shows, leaving little freedom of expression to local directors. OCESA Teatro has responded that this is due to copyright restrictions established in the contracts of the original plays; however, despite those directors' complains, the company's most successful shows are those who have been kept faithful to their original Broadway counterparts.
