= Ares (Arcángel album) =

Studio album by Arcángel
- Released: July 13, 2018
- Genres: Latin trap; Latin hip hop
- Length: 64:23
- Language: Spanish
- Labels: Pina; Sony Latin
- Producers: Light GM; EZ "Made the Beat"; Santo Niño; Sansary; Linkon

Arcángel chronology
Los Favoritos (2015)	Ares (2018)	Historias de un Capricornio (2019)

Singles from Ares
- 1. "El Granjero" Released: January 5, 2018; 2. "Original" Released: June 28, 2018

Ares is the third studio album by American rapper Arcángel, released on July 13, 2018, through Pina Records and Sony Music Latin. A Latin trap album, it contains collaborations with La Exce, Tory Lanez, J Balvin and Bad Bunny.

== Background ==
Arcángel announced that he would transition from reggaeton to Latin trap music, with release of his third album Ares, which contains no reggaeton songs. In January 2018, he released the single "El Granjero", along with its music video which features Marlon Moreno. "Original", with Bad Bunny, was released in late June 2018 as the second single from Ares.

== Track listing ==
Ares track listing
No.	Title	Writer(s)	Length
1.	"Atmósfera"	Austin Agustín Santos; Felipe R. Marticotte; Luis A. Silfides	4:14
2.	"Se Supone"	A. Santos; F. Marticotte	3:28
3.	"Original" (with Bad Bunny)	A. Santos; Benito Martinez; Ezequiel Rivera; Henry De La Prida	4:06
4.	"Date Cuenta"	A. Santos; F. Marticotte	3:24
5.	"Mi Primer Kilo"	A. Santos; F. Marticotte	3:36
6.	"Corte, Porte y Elegancia" (with J Balvin)	A. Santos; José Á. Balvín; Lincoln N. Castaneda	3:23
7.	"Los 3"	A. Santos; Cristhian A. Fermín; Michael F. Quezada	2:57
8.	"Me Gusta"	A. Santos; F. Marticotte	3:29
9.	"Victoria" (with Tory Lanez)	A. Santos; Daystar S. Peterson; E. Rivera	4:07
10.	"En Su Boca"	A. Santos; F. Marticotte	3:09
11.	"Pa Morir Se Nace" (with La Exce)	A. Santos; Cristhian A. Fermíin; Jean C. Ferreira; Luis A. Silfides	3:14
12.	"De la Renta"	A. Santos; C. Fermíin; L. Silfides; Ángel del Jesus Pérez	3:32
13.	"Lo Que Sea"	A. Santos; F. Marticotte	3:24
14.	"Piernas en el Aire"	A. Santos; F. Marticotte; Michael F. Quezada	3:40
15.	"Un Vacilon (Young Maelo)"	A. Santos; Henry D. Williams; Jimmy Valerio; Wander M. Mendez	3:41
16.	"Caribbean Blue"	A. Santos; F. Marticotte; C. Fermíin; L. Silfides	3:22
17.	"Balanceate"	A. Santos	3:48
18.	"El Granjero"	A. Santos; F. Marticotte	3:44
Total length:			51:54

== Personnel ==
Credits adapted from the album's liner notes.

- Arcángel – vocals, producer, songwriting, art direction
- Rafael Pina – executive producer
- Gaby Music – mixing
- Esteban Piñeiro – mastering

== Charts ==
Chart performance for Ares
Chart (2018)	Peak position
Spanish Albums (Promusicae)	74
US Latin Rhythm Albums (Billboard)	5
US Top Latin Albums (Billboard)	5
