= Hipódromo de las Américas =

Racecourse in Mexico City, Mexico

Coordinates: 19°26′19″N 99°13′22″W

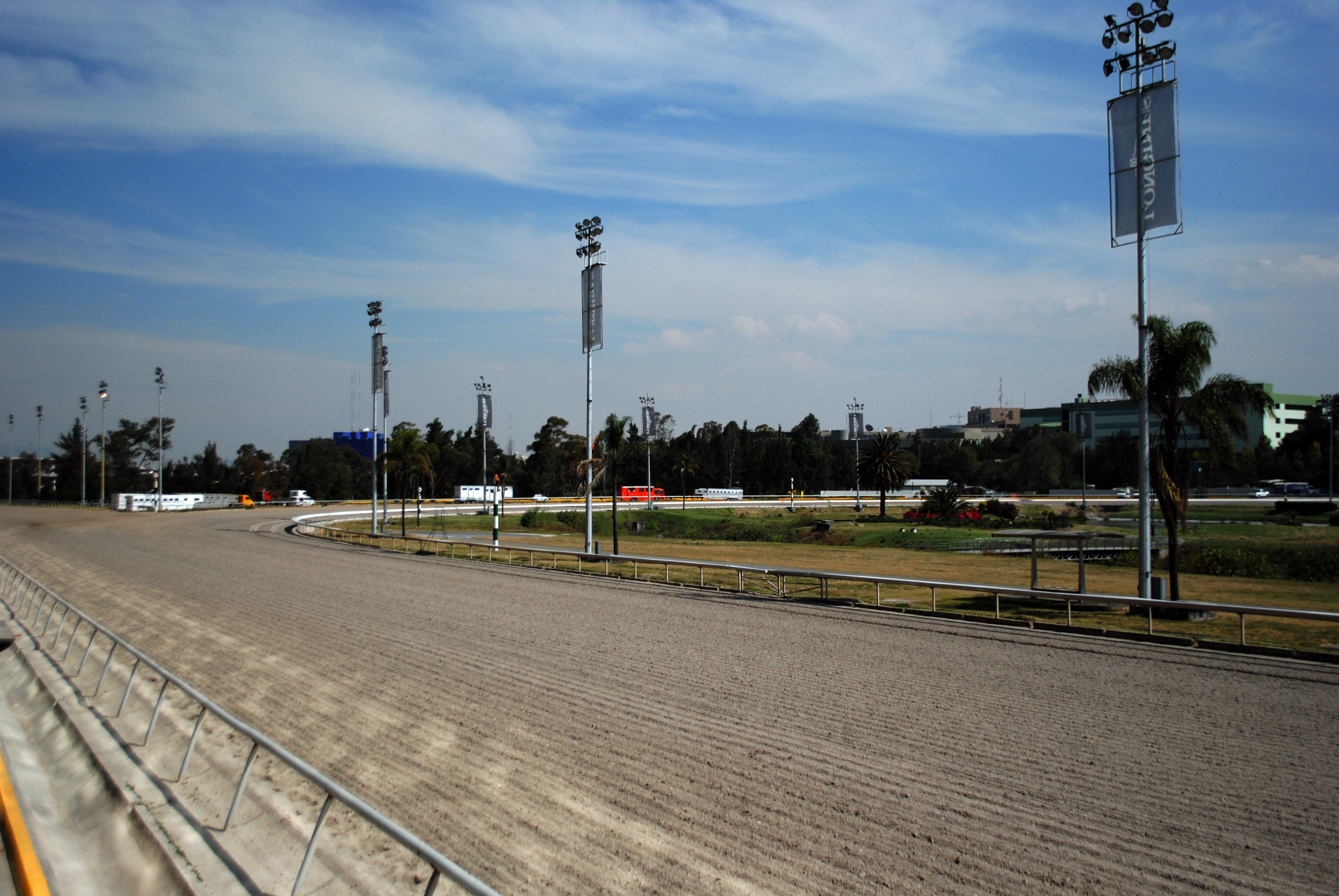
- Main access to the track
- Location: Mexico City
- Owned by: Grupo CIE
- Date opened: 6 March 1943

Hipódromo de las Américas is a thoroughbred and quarter-horse race track in Mexico City, Mexico that had its inaugural meeting on March 6, 1943. It is located approximately four and one-half miles from the downtown district, on Lomas de Sotelo, Mexico City. It is operated by Grupo CIE.

Facilities include the original club-house and grandstand, with seating for 20,000 persons, as well a stable area which can accommodate 1700 horses. It is the home of the Mexican Derby, and many prominent jockeys have ridden there over the years.

- Track: oval; Two Chutes: Seven furlongs and one and one-quarter miles.
- Record Attendance: 43,371 on Feb. 5, 1981; Record Pari-Mutuel Handle: $1,428,858 on May 30, 1981.
