= Los Ángeles Azules =

Mexican musical group

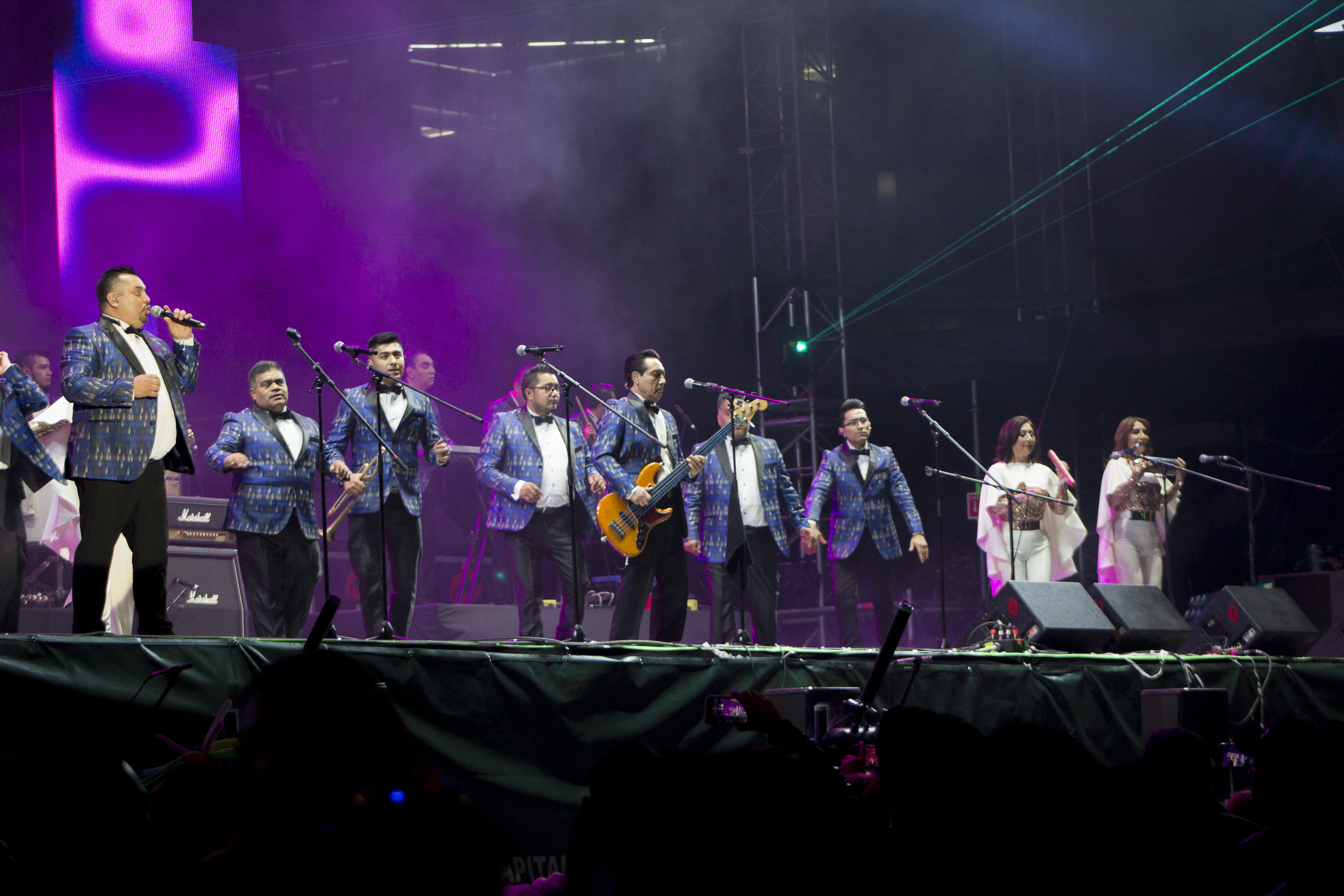

Background information
- Origin: Iztapalapa, Mexico City, Mexico
- Genres: Mexican cumbia, Cumbia Sinfónica
- Years active: 1976–present
- Website: losangelesazules.com.mx

Los Ángeles Azules (lit. 'The Blue Angels') are a Mexican musical group that plays the Mexican Cumbia genre, which is the style of cumbia adopted in various Mexican regions.

== History ==
The group got together in 1976, but started officially in 1980. It was formed by the siblings of the Mejía Avante family: Elías, Alfredo, José Hilario, Jorge, Cristina, and Guadalupe.

The group went through various periods of popularity and various styles. In 1997, they had a huge hit with Cómo Te Voy a Olvidar. Later, in 2013, they re-recorded many hits with guest vocalists including Carla Morrison, Lila Downs, and Ximena Sariñana. In 2014, they launched a new musical genre, cumbia sinfónica, as they performed their greatest contemporary hits with the Mexico City Symphony Orchestra. Their subsequent album Cómo Te Voy a Olvidar Edición de Súper Lujo reached #5 on the Mexican regional music charts.

In 2016, they issued De Plaza En Plaza, which features collaborations with Mexican artists Gloria Trevi, Yuri, and Natalia Lafourcade, Spanish musician Miguel Bosé, and the American duo Ha*Ash, among others. The first single from the album was "La Cumbia del Infinito," with Natalia Lafourcade and Rodrigo & Gabriela, released on June 3, 2016. The second single "Mi Niña Mujer" with Ha*Ash was released on August 5, 2016. The same year they recorded their twenty-seventh album Esto Sí Es Cumbia.

The album was officially released in June 2018, under the OCESA Seitrack. Esto Sí Es Cumbia consists entirely of cover songs, including interpretations of "Nunca Es Suficiente" with Natalia Lafourcade, "Me Cuesta Tanto Olvidarte" with Ana Torroja, "Perdón, Perdón" with Ha*Ash, "El Amor Después del Amor" with Fito Paéz, among others. In 2018, they played on the Coachella Stage at the Coachella Valley Music and Arts Festival, marking the first time a traditional cumbia group played at the popular festival.

== Discography ==
=== Studio albums ===
- Ritmo... Alegría... Sabor!, Vol. 1 (1982)
- Los Ángeles Azules, Vol. 2 (1983)
- Los Ángeles Azules, Vol. 3 (1984)
- Cumbia de la Tostadita, Vol. 4 (1985)
- Cumbia de las Chispitas, Vol. 5 (1987)
- Los Ángeles Azules, Vol. 6 (1988)
- Y Valió La Pena Esperar, Vol. 7 (1989)
- Y Esta... Si Es Cumbia, Vol. 8 (1991; Last album recorded at Discos Peerless.)
- Entrega de Amor (1993), Disa Records
- Sin Pecado (1995)
- Inolvidables/Como Te Voy A Olvidar (1996)
- Confesiones [El Grupo Tropical De La Década] (1998)
- Una Lluvia De Rosas (1999)
- Alas Al Mundo (2002)
- Nunca Te Olvidaré (2004)
- Interpretan Éxitos de Juan Gabriel (2006; Last album recorded at Disa Records.)
- Tu Juguete (2007), Musart (Balboa Records)
- A Ritmo De Cumbia/Iztapalapa Te Quiero (2012)
- Cómo Te Voy a Olvidar (2013), OCESA Seitrack, Sony Music
- Viernes Cultural (2014), OCESA Seitrack
- De Plaza En Plaza (2016), OCESA Seitrack
- Esto Sí Es Cumbia (2018), OCESA Seitrack
- De Buenos Aires Para El Mundo (2020), OCESA Seitrack and Sony Music
- Cumbia del Corazón (2022), OCESA Seitrack
- Se Agradece (2024), OCESA Seitrack

=== Live albums ===
- En Vivo, Azul Vivo (2002), Disa
- En Vivo, Gira2005 (2005; DVD), Disa
- En Vivo Desde Phoenix. (2020; digital download only), Sony Music

=== EPs ===
- Dance Mixes (1997; remix album), Disa

=== Compilations ===
- 15 Hits (1995), Discos Peerless
- 12 Éxitos Instrumentales (1995), Disa Records
- 15 Exitos de Colección (1996), Discos Peerless
- Mis Primeros 15 Exitos de Colección (1997), Disa
- Frente A Frente (Los Recatadores De La Cumbia)/(con Rayito Colombiano). (2000; only available in US), Emi Latín/Disa
- Grandes Éxitos. (2001; only available in Argentina), Leader Music/Disa
- Historia Musical-30 Pegaditas. (2001), Disa
- Encuentro De Ángeles Volumen 01/Con Los Ángeles De Charly. (2003), Disa/Fonovisa
- Top 10. (2004), Disa
- Grandes Exitos: Remezclados y Remasterizados. (2005), Disa/Universal Music Group
- Encuentro De Ángeles Volumen 02/Con Los Ángeles De Charly. (2006), Disa/Fonovisa
- 20 Reales Super Exitos. (2007), Disa/Universal Music Group
- Oro Grupero/(con Los Ángeles De Charly). (2008; only available in US), Universal Music Group
- Serie 33:Mi Niña Mujer (2009), Disa/Universal Music Group
- Colección Privada: Las 20 Exclusivas [Edición limitada] (2009), Disa/Universal Music Group
- 15 Exitos (2010), Disa/Universal Music Group
- 20 Kilates (2012), Disa/Universal Music Group
- Iconos 25 Exitos (2012), Disa/Universal Music Group
- Basico & Elemental. (2013; 2CDS+DVD), Disa/Universal Music Group
- Grandes Éxitos De (2013; digital download only), Independiente Records
- 21 Black Jack: Nueva Edición remasterizada (2013), Disa/Universal Music Group
- Imprescindibles (2014), Disa/Universal Music Group
- Gran Encuentro (20 Éxitos Originales)/(con Los Ángeles de Charly). (2014; only available in US), Universal Music Group
- 20 Éxitos Historia Musical (2015), Discos Cristal
- Pachangon Sonidero (2015), Universal Music Group
- Duelo De Angeles (con Los Angeles Negros). (2015), Universal Music México
- Singles. (2016; digital download only), Universal Music Group
- Como Te Voy A Olvidar (Baile Total). (2017; digital download only), Universal Music Group
- Visión 20.20 Exitos. (2017), Universal Music Group
- Los Príncipes De México. (2017; digital download only), D&O Records
- Los Príncipes De La Cumbia en Mexico (2019; digital download only), Esongs Entreteinment
