= List of songs recorded by Fey =

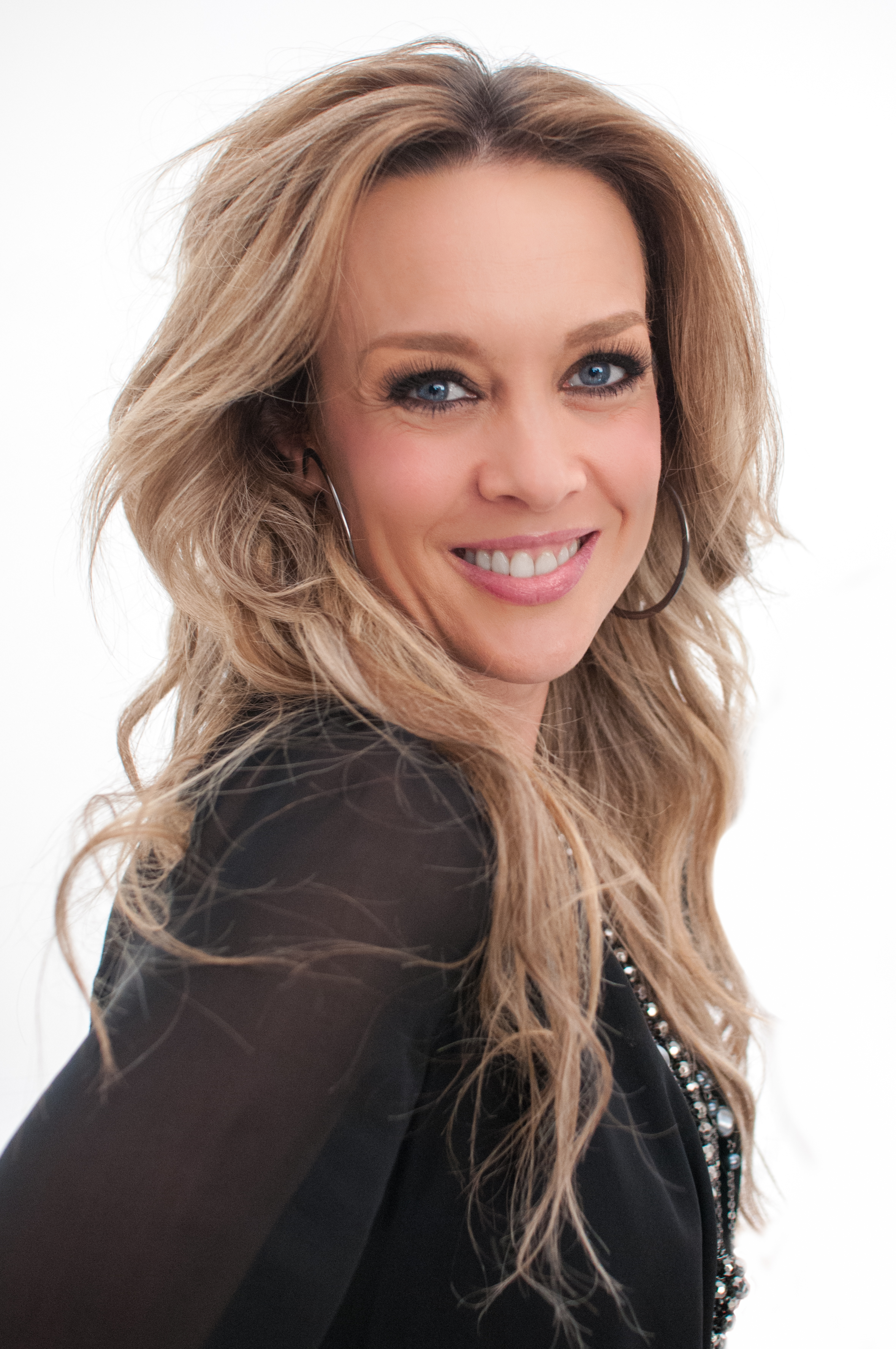
Fey in 2012

Fey is a Mexican singer who started her career in 1995. She released 7 studio albums throughout the 90's and 00's and has released several stand-alone singles in recent years.

== Songs ==
Key
†	Indicates a song Fey has covered
≠	Indicates a song that Fey has adapted from a different language
±	Indicates a song recorded live with no studio version
‡	Indicates the English version of a song she also released in Spanish
÷	Indicates the Portuguese version of a song she also released in Spanish

Released songs recorded by Fey
Song	Other performer(s)	Writer(s)	Originating album	Year	Ref.
"Adicto a Mi Cuerpo"		Fey; José Francisco Blázquez Gil; Tiziano Borghi	Dulce Tentación	2009	
"Aire" †		José María Cano	La Fuerza del Destino	2004	
"Alma Gemela"		Fey; Robert Jazayeri	Vértigo	2002	
"Almíbar"		José Ramón Florez; David Boradoni	El Color de los Sueños	1998	
"Ambition" ‡		Fey; Graeme Pleeth; Robin Barter	Vértigo	2002	
"Amo"			Non-album single	2016	
"Ay Qué Pesado" †		Ignacio Cano	La Fuerza del Destino	2004	
"Azúcar Amargo"		Mario Ablanedo; David Boradoni	Tierna la Noche	1996	
"Azúcar Amargo" ±	Caló; JNS	Belén Aguilar Esponda; Mario García Arango	90's Pop Tour, Vol. 1	2017	
"Azúcar Amargo"	Marta Sánchez	Mario Ablanedo; David Boradoni	Non-album single	2025	
"Açúcar Amargo" ÷		Mario Ablanedo; David Boradoni; César Lemos (Portuguese Adaptation)	Tierna la Noche (Brazil)	1997	
"Bailando Bajo la Lluvia"		Gian Pietro Felisatti; José Ramón Florez	Fey	1995	
"Bailando Por Ti"	Esteman	Fey; Esteban Mateus Williamson; Carlos Gonzalez Callejo	Non-album single	2024	
"Bailando Sola"		Mario Ablanedo; David Boradoni	Tierna la Noche	1996	
"Bajo el Arcoíris"		Mario Ablanedo	Tierna la Noche	1996	
"Barco a Venus" †		Ignacio Cano	La Fuerza del Destino	2004	
"Bitter Sugar" ‡		Mario Ablanedo; David Boradoni; English Adaptation: Fey, Klaus Derendorf	Non-album single	1997	
"Bombón"		Gian Pietro Felisatti; José Ramón Florez	Fey	1995	
"Borrando la Historia"		Fey; José Francisco Blázquez Gil; Tiziano Borghi	Dulce Tentación	2009	
"Busca Algo Barato" †		Ignacio Cano	La Fuerza del Destino	2004	
"Canela"		José Ramón Florez; David Boradoni	El Color de los Sueños	1998	
"Cicatrices"		Fey; José Francisco Blázquez Gil; Cynthia Camacho; Samuel Fisher	Dulce Tentación	2009	
"Cielo Líquido"		José Ramón Florez; David Boradoni	El Color de los Sueños	1998	
"Come and Go" ‡		Fey; Graeme Pleeth; Robin Barter	Vértigo	2002	
"Comiéndome Tus Besos"		Fey; Carlos Baute	Non-album single	2018	
"Como Pan y Chocolate"		José Ramón Florez; Fredi Marugán	Fey	1995	
"Como un Ángel" ≠		Staffan Hellstrand; Fey (Spanish Adaptation)	Faltan Lunas	2006	
"Color Esperanza / Sólo le Pido a Dios (Versión México)" †	Various Artists	Coti; Leon Gieco; Diego Torres; Cachorro López	Non-album single	2020	
"Cruz de Navajas" †		José María Cano	La Fuerza del Destino	2004	
"Dark Angel" ‡		Fey; Robert Jazayeri; D. Burke; K. Corbett	Vértigo	2002	
"De Corazón a Corazón"		José Ramón Florez; David Boradoni	El Color de los Sueños	1998	
"Desmargaritando el Corazón"		Mario Ablanedo; David Boradoni	Tierna la Noche	1996	
"Devil's Angel" ‡		Fey	Sweet Temptation	2009	
"Dime"		Fey; Graeme Pleeth; Robin Barter	Vértigo	2002	
"Díselo Con Flores"		José Ramón Florez; Lerry Nutti	El Color de los Sueños	1998	
"Disparándole a la Nada"		Fey; Benjamín Díaz; Daniel Rondón; Alejandra Zeguer	Non-album single	2024	
"Dolerá"		Fey; José Francisco Blázquez Gil; Tiziano Borghi	Dulce Tentación	2009	
"Donde Quiera Que Estés" †	Aleks Syntek	KC Porter; Miguel Flores	Selena ¡VIVE!	2005	
"Dos Corazones"		Gian Pietro Felisatti; José Ramón Florez	Fey	1995	
"Dressing to Kill" ‡		Fey; Graeme Pleeth; Robin Barter	Vértigo	2002	
"Dulce Manzana"		Fey; José Francisco Blázquez Gil; Samuel Fisher	Dulce Tentación	2009	
"Él"		José Ramón Florez; David Boradoni	El Color de los Sueños	1998	
"El Cielo Puede Esperar" ±	Aleks Syntek	Aleks Syntek	Primera Fila	2012	
"El Color de los Sueños"		José Ramón Florez; J. Giralt	El Color de los Sueños	1998	
"Entre Dos" ≠		Anders Wollbeck	Faltan Lunas	2006	
"Faltan Lunas" ≠		Graeme Pleeth; Sheelie Poole; Spanish Adaptation: Fey, Nacho Larrañaga	Faltan Lunas	2006	
"Fiebre del Sábado"		Gian Pietro Felisatti; José Ramón Florez	Fey	1995	
"Flor de un Día"		José Ramón Florez; David Boradoni	El Color de los Sueños	1998	
"Follow Me" ‡		Fey; Robert Jazayeri; Alexander; Stephenson; Youle	Vértigo	2002	
"Frío" ±		Armando Ávila; Marcela de la Garza	Primera Fila	2012	
"Games That You Play" ‡		Fey	Sweet Temptation	2009	
"Gatos en el Balcón"		José Ramón Florez; Fredi Marugán	Fey	1995	
"Gatos en el Balcón" ±		José Ramón Florez; Fredi Marugán	90's Pop Tour, Vol. 1	2017	
"Grítalo"		Fey; Robert Jazayeri	Vértigo	2002	
"Guilty Pleasure" ‡		Fey	Sweet Temptation	2009	
"Hoy No Me Puedo Levantar" †		José María Cano; Ignacio Cano	La Fuerza del Destino	2004	
"Ilusão Colorida" ÷		Mario Ablanedo; David Boradoni; César Lemos (Portuguese Adaptation)	Tierna la Noche (Brazil)	1997	
"In Your Dreams" ‡		Fey	Sweet Temptation	2009	
"Iyé"			El Color de los Sueños	1998	
"La Edad de la Inocencia"		José Ramón Florez	Estrellas de Navidad	1997	
"La Espuma de los Días"		José Ramón Florez; David Boradoni	El Color de los Sueños	1998	
"La Fragilidad"		Fey; José Francisco Blázquez Gil; Tiziano Borghi	Dulce Tentación	2009	
"La Fuerza del Destino" †		José María Cano; Ignacio Cano	La Fuerza del Destino	2004	
"La Madrugada, Tú y la Radio"		José Ramón Florez; David Boradoni	El Color de los Sueños	1998	
"La Noche Se Mueve"		José Ramón Florez	Fey	1995	
"La Noche Se Mueve" ±	OV7	José Ramón Florez	90's Pop Tour, Vol. 1	2017	
"La Soledad Me Matará"		Gian Pietro Felisatti; José Ramón Florez	Fey	1995	
"La Última Gota"		Carola Rosas; Armando Ávila	Faltan Lunas	2006	
"La Viuda Negra"		Fey; José Francisco Blázquez Gil; Tiziano Borghi	Dulce Tentación	2009	
"Las Lágrimas de Mi Almohada"		José Ramón Florez; Fredi Marugán	Tierna la Noche	1996	
"Latido del Amor"		Fey; Joey Barrios; Giovani S. Ortega; K Sotomayor; K. R. Ellestad	Non-album single	2026	
"Lentamente"		Fey; José Francisco Blázquez Gil; Cynthia Camacho; Samuel Fisher	Dulce Tentación	2009	
"Let Me Show You" ‡		Fey; José Francisco Blázquez Gil; Cynthia Camacho; Samuel Fisher	Sweet Temptation	2009	
"Loca por Amarte"		Fey; Graeme Pleeth; Robin Barter	Vértigo	2002	
"Loneliness" ‡		Fey	Sweet Temptation	2009	
"Los Amantes" †		Ignacio Cano	La Fuerza del Destino	2004	
"Malherido" †		Mónica Naranjo	Non-album single	2026	
"Me Colé en una Fiesta" †		Ignacio Cano	La Fuerza del Destino	2004	
"Me Cuesta Tanto Olvidarte" †		José María Cano	La Fuerza del Destino	2004	
"Me Enamoro de Ti"		José Ramón Florez; Fredi Marugán	Fey	1995	
"Me Enamoro de Ti" ±	JNS	José Ramón Florez; Fredi Marugán	90's Pop Tour, Vol. 1	2017	
"Me Haces Tanta Falta" ±		Armando Ávila; Marcela de la Garza	Primera Fila	2012	
"Me Has Vuelto Loca"		Ray Contreras; Jimmy Greco; Claudia Brant	Faltan Lunas	2006	
"Media Naranja"		José Ramón Florez; Fredi Marugán	Fey	1995	
"Media Naranja" ≠	Litzy; JNS; Caló; OV7	José Ramón Florez; Fredi Marugán	90's Pop Tour, Vol. 1	2017	
"Media Naranja 2.0"		José Ramón Florez; Fredi Marugán	Non-album single	2009	
"Medley"		José Ramón Florez; Fredi Marugán; Mario Ablanedo	Non-album single	2009	
"Mexe e Remexe" ÷		Mario Ablanedo; César Lemos (Portuguese Adaptation)	Tierna la Noche (Brazil)	1997	
"Mírame a los Ojos" ±	OV7; Caló; JNS; The Sacados; Aleks Syntek; Litzy; Erik Rubín	Mario Ablanedo; David Boradoni	90's Pop Tour, Vol. 1	2017	
"Monsters" ‡		Fey	Sweet Temptation	2009	
"Move It" ‡		Mario Ablanedo; David Wiseburg (English Adaptation)	Non-album single	1997	
"Move It (Spanglish)" ‡		Mario Ablanedo; David Wiseburg (English Adaptation)	Non-album single	1997	
"Muévelo"		Mario Ablanedo	Tierna la Noche	1996	
"Mujer Contra Mujer" †		José María Cano	La Fuerza del Destino	2004	
"Ni Tú Ni Nadie" †		Mario Ablanedo	El Color de los Sueños	1998	
"Ni Tú Ni Nadie" † ±	Beto Cuevas	Mario Ablanedo	90's Pop Tour, Vol. 2	2018	
"Niños de la Calle"	Various Artists	José Ramón Florez; Fredi Marugán	Non-album single	1995	
"No Es Obsesión" ±	OV7	Carlos Lara	90's Pop Tour, Vol. 1	2017	
"No Me Acostumbro"	Lenny de la Rosa	Descemer Bueno; Israel Rojas	Non-album single	2016	
"No More Lies" ‡		Fey	Sweet Temptation	2009	
"No Te Necesito"		Fey; Edgar Barrera; Manuel Lara	Non-album single	2018	
"No Tengo Novio"		José Ramón Florez; David Boradoni	El Color de los Sueños	1998	
"Noche Ideal"		Fey; Graeme Pleeth; Robin Barter	Vértigo	2002	
"One Suitcase (Aquí Estoy)" ‡		Lundberg; De Giorgio	Non-album single	2006	
"Popocatépetl"		Mario Ablanedo	Tierna la Noche	1996	
"Popocatépetl" ±	MDO; Caló	Mario Ablanedo	90's Pop Tour, Vol. 2	2018	
"Provócame"		Fey; José Francisco Blázquez Gil; Tiziano Borghi	Dulce Tentación	2009	
"Ritmo de la Noche" † ±	The Sacados; Erik Rubín; JNS; OV7; Aleks Syntek; Litzy	Alex Joerg Christensen; Ingo Hauss; Helmut Hoinkis; Hayo Lewerentz	90's Pop Tour, Vol. 1	2017	
"Romeo & Juliet"		Fey; Robert Jazayeri	Vértigo	2002	
"Romeo and Juliet" ‡		Fey; Robert Jazayeri	Vértigo	2002	
"Say It Again" ‡		Fey; Robert Jazayeri	Vértigo	2002	
"Sé lo Que Vendrá"		Fey; Graeme Pleeth; Robin Barter	Vértigo	2002	
"Sexo, Pudor y Lágrimas" ±	OV7; Caló; JNS; The Sacados; Aleks Syntek; Litzy; Erik Rubín	Aleks Syntek	90's Pop Tour, Vol. 1	2017	
"Shabadabada" ±	OV7; Caló; JNS; The Sacados; Aleks Syntek; Litzy; Erik Rubín	Ettore Grenci; Loris Ceroni; Mónica Vélez	90's Pop Tour, Vol. 1	2017	
"Show Me" ‡		Fey; Graeme Pleeth; Robin Barter	Vértigo	2002	
"Si Tengo Miedo"		Manu	Faltan Lunas	2006	
"Siento"		Fey; Graeme Pleeth; Robin Barter	Vértigo	2002	
"Siento" ‡		Fey; Graeme Pleeth; Robin Barter	Vértigo	2002	
"Siento Caer"		Fey; Robert Jazayeri	Vértigo	2002	
"Sirena de Cristal"		Fey; José Francisco Blázquez Gil; Samuel Fisher	Dulce Tentación	2009	
"Sólo por Bailar" ≠		Jade Ell; Niklas Bergwall; Niklas Kings; Sylwia Chaliss	Faltan Lunas	2006	
"Subidón"		Mario Ablanedo; David Boradoni	Tierna la Noche	1996	
"Super Trouper" †		Benny Andersson; Björn Ulvaeus	Dancing Queens - Un Tributo para ABBA	2014	
"Sweet Agony" ‡		Fey	Sweet Temptation	2009	
"Sweet as Sin" ‡		Fey	Sweet Temptation	2009	
"Tamborada"		Mario Ablanedo; David Boradoni	Music of the World Cup: Allez! Ola! Olé!	1998	
"Te Pertenezco"		Mario Ablanedo; David Boradoni	Tierna la Noche	1996	
"Te Pertenezco" ±	Caló	Mario Ablanedo; David Boradoni	90's Pop Tour, Vol. 1	2017	
"That's What Love's All About" ‡		Fey; Graeme Pleeth; Robin Barter	Vértigo	2002	
"The Other Side" ‡		Fey; Graeme Pleeth; Robin Barter	Vértigo	2002	
"The Perfect Song" †	Paul Oakenfold	Fey; Paul Oakenfold; Anthony Crawford	Non-album single	2020	
"The Way You Love Me" ‡		Fey; Robert Jazayeri	Vértigo	2002	
"Tierna la Noche"		Mario Ablanedo; Lerry Nutti	Tierna la Noche	1996	
"Tirando a Matar"		Gian Pietro Felisatti; José Ramón Florez	Fey	1995	
"To Be Honest" ‡		Fey; Graeme Pleeth; Robin Barter	Vértigo	2002	
"Todo Cambió"		Janette Chao	Big Brother 3-R	2005	
"Tres Razones" ≠		Valeria Rossi; Spanish Adaptation: Francisco Cabras, Liliana Ritten	Faltan Lunas	2006	
"Un Año Más" †		Ignacio Cano	La Fuerza del Destino	2004	
"Un Poco Loco"		Mario Ablanedo; David Boradoni	Tierna la Noche	1996	
"Veneno"		Fey; Manuel Lara; Efraín González	Non-album single	2023	
"Vertigo" ‡		Fey; Graeme Pleeth; Robin Barter	Vértigo	2002	
"Vértigo"		Fey; Graeme Pleeth; Robin Barter	Vértigo	2002	
"Vienen y Van"		Fey; Graeme Pleeth; Robin Barter	Vértigo	2002	
"Volar Otra Vez" ≠		Graeme Pleeth; Sheelie Poole	Faltan Lunas	2006	
"Volviendo a Empezar"		Fey; José Francisco Blázquez Gil; Tiziano Borghi	Dulce Tentación	2009	
"Vuelve"		José Ramón Florez; J. Giralt	El Color de los Sueños	1998	
"Y Aquí Estoy" ≠		Lundberg; De Giorgio; Spanish Adaptation: Ángela D., S. Rivas	Faltan Lunas	2006	
"Yo Decido" ≠		Mattias Lindblom; Anders Wollbeck; Andy Love	Faltan Lunas	2006	
"Your Game Is Over" ‡		Fey	Sweet Temptation	2009	

== See also ==
- Fey discography
