= Fey discography =

- Studio albums: 7
- Extended plays: 1
- Live albums: 1
- Compilation albums: 11
- Tribute albums: 1
- Singles: 33
- Video albums: 1
- Music videos: 19
- Box set: 1

The discography of the Mexican singer Fey consists of six studio albums, one tribute album, eleven collections, one box set, an album format VHS and published over thirty singles in several countries. Sony Music, a subsidiary in Mexico released her first single "Media naranja" in 1995, becoming an instant success. The publication of her second album was given to know in the U.S. and Spain. Her next publication consolidate her success and expand her popularity to other countries around the world.

By 2002, Fey published Vértigo. Fey experimented new rhythms with electronic and industrial music. The low promotion around the world makes have low sales. By 2004 with a new record company EMI Music released two albums that were not commercial but managed to keep in the music scene. Again the low promotion made that this time the singer leave the label in search of new musical collaborators.

By 2008, Fey signed a contract with an independent label, the following year published Dulce Tentación and return to the tops in Mexico and Latin America, after almost five years.

In this 2012, Fey signed a new contract with the first label to promote her eighth album. Currently estimated sales of their products all in more than twenty million copies worldwide.

== Albums ==
=== Studio albums ===
List of studio albums, with selected chart positions and certifications
Title	Album details	Peak chart positions									Certifications (sales thresholds)
Title	Album details	ARG	BRA	CHL	COL	ESP	USA	MEX	PER	VEN	Certifications (sales thresholds)
Fey	Released: March 21, 1995; Label: Sony Music; Formats: CD, cassette	8	—	10	2	—	—	1	1	3	MEX: Platinum
Tierna La Noche	Released: November 5, 1996; Label: Sony Music; Formats: CD, cassette	3	8	1	1	36	6	1	1	1	MEX: Diamond
El Color de los Sueños	Released: November 3, 1998; Label: Sony Music; Formats: CD, cassette	4	—	2	5	60	9	1	1	3	MEX: 2× Gold
Vértigo	Released: May 21, 2002; Label: Sony Music; Formats: CD, cassette	15	—	—	23	—	—	1	—	—	
Faltan Lunas	Released: August 1, 2006; Label: EMI Music; Formats: CD, digital	—	—	—	7	—	—	9	—	—	
Dulce Tentación	Released: May 5, 2009; Label: Mi Rey Music; Formats: CD, digital	10	—	—	—	—	—	5	—	—	

=== Tribute album ===
Title	Album details	Peak chart positions			Certifications (sales thresholds)
Title	Album details	CHL	USA	MEX	Certifications (sales thresholds)
La Fuerza del Destino	Released: December 14, 2004; Label: EMI Music; Formats: CD	16	8	5	MEX: Gold

=== Live album ===
Title	Album details	Certifications
Fey en concierto: Tierna la noche	Released: 1997; Live from Auditorio Nacional; Production by: Televisa; Formats: VHS	
Tour de los sueños	Released: 1999; Live from Auditorio Nacional	
Primera Fila	Released: October 23, 2012	MEX: Gold
Todo lo Que Soy – En Vivo	Released: December 17, 2014; Live from Auditorio Nacional	

=== Compilation albums ===
Title	Album details
Canta con Sony Pistas: Fey	Released: 1996; Label: Sony music
Lo mejor del siglo XX	Released: 1999; Label: Sony music
Colección de oro	Released: 1999; Label: Sony music
Me encanta Panasonic	Released: 1999; Label: Sony music
Éxitos	Released: November 7, 2000; Label: Sony music
Antología (Vol.1)	Released: 2004; Label: Sony music
20 Éxitos originales	Released: 2005; Label: Sony music
Antologia (Vol.2)	Released: 2006; Label: Sony music
Siempre rebelde	Released: 2006; Label: Vene music
Best of Fey	Released: 2007; Label: EMI music
10 de colección	Released: 2008; Label: Sony music
Lo esencial de Fey	Released: 2009; Label: Sony music; Box set

=== EP ===
Title	Album details
Aire	Only Spain and Japan edition; Label: EMI music

== Singles ==
List of Spanish singles, with selected chart positions and certifications, showing year released and album name
Title	Year	Peak chart positions										Album
Title	Year	ARG	BOL	BRA	CHL	COL	ESP	CAL	MEX	PER	VEN	Album
"Media naranja"	1995	1	1	—	1	1	—	1	1	1	1	Fey
"Gatos en el balcón"	1995	12	4	—	7	1	—	17	1	9	6	Fey
"Me enamoro de ti"	1995	5	1	—	10	3	—	39	1	2	—	Fey
"La noche se mueve"	1996	—	—	—	—	—	—	—	1	12	—	Fey
"Bailando bajo la lluvia"	1996	—	—	—	—	—	—	—	13	—	—	Fey
"Fiebre del sábado"	1996	—	—	—	—	—	—	—	10	—	—	Fey
"Azúcar amargo"	1996	1	1	1	1	1	5	1	1	1	1	Tierna la noche
"Muévelo"	1997	1	1	5	1	1	17	9	1	1	1	Tierna la noche
"Te pertenezco"	1997	4	2	—	3	1	—	—	1	1	4	Tierna la noche
"Popocatépetl"	1997	—	—	—	—	—	—	—	1	—	—	Tierna la noche
"Subidón"	1997	8	1	—	4	1	—	2	1	1	1	Tierna la noche
"Bajo el arcoiris"	1998	—	—	—	—	—	—	—	1	—	—	Tierna la noche
"Las lágrimas de mi almohada"	1998	10	4	—	8	5	—	33	1	2	—	Tierna la noche
"Desmargaritando el corazón"	1998	6	3	—	4	10	—	—	1	4	4	Tierna la noche
"Ni tu ni nadie"	1998	1	1	—	1	1	25	7	1	1	1	El color de los sueños
"Díselo con flores"	1999	13	6	—	7	5	—	18	1	12	10	El color de los sueños
"Cielo liquido"	1999	1	—	—	4	2	—	—	1	3	5	El color de los sueños
"Canela"	1999	2	2	—	6	4	—	24	1	1	3	El color de los sueños
"El"	1999	—	—	—	—	—	—	—	1	15	—	El color de los sueños
"No tengo novio"	1999	—	—	—	—	—	—	—	10	—	—	El color de los sueños
"Sé lo que vendrá" / "The other side""	2002	8	—	—	—	10	—	16	1	27	—	Vértigo
"Dressing to kill" / "Noche ideal"	2002	—	—	—	—	—	—	—	8	—	—	Vértigo
"Loca por amarte" /"Ambition"	2002											Vértigo
"Romeo y Julieta"	2003	—	—	—	—	7	—	—	—	—	—	Vértigo
"La fuerza del destino"	2004				16	14		42	1			La fuerza del destino
"Barco a Venus"	2005				14	10		43	1			La fuerza del destino
"Me cuesta tanto olvidarte"	2005	—	—	—	—	—	—	55	1	—	—	La fuerza del destino
"Y aquí estoy"	2006	—	—	—	—	1	—	21	—	—	—	Faltan lunas
"Como un ángel"	2007	—	—	—	—	—	—	—	—	—	—	Faltan lunas
"Cicatrices"	2008	—	—	—	—	—	—	—	—	—	—	Dulce tentación
"Lentamente" /"Let me show you"	2009	9	—	—	—	—	—	86	1	—	—	Dulce tentación
"Provócame"	2009	—	—	—	—	—	—	—	16	—	—	Dulce tentación
"Adicto a mi cuerpo"	2010	—	—	—	—	—	—	—	—	—	—	Dulce tentación
"Frío	2012	13	—	—	—	—	—	—	8	—	—	Fey: Primera Fila
"—" denotes the single failed to chart or was not released.

== Music videos ==
List of music videos, showing year released and director
Title	Year	Director(s)
"Media naranja"	1995	Ruben Galindo
"Gatos en el balcón"	1995	Ruben Galindo, Mauri y Fey
"Me enamoro de ti"	1995	Abraham Pulido
"Azúcar amargo"	1996	Luis de Velasco
"Te pertenezco"	1997	Live: Auditorio Nacional
"Subidón"	1997	Pedro Torres
"Ni tu ni nadie"	1998	A. Gonzalez
"Díselo con flores"	1999	Sergio Toporek
"Canela"	1999	Luis de Velasco
"Sé lo que vendrá"	2002	Gustavo Garzón
"The other side"	2002	Gustavo Garzón
"La fuerza del destino"	2004	Oliver Castro
"Barco a Venus"	2005	Esteban Madrazo y Jorge Abarca
"Me cuesta tanto olvidarte"	2005	Esteban Madrazo y Jorge Abarca
"Y aquí estoy"	2006	Julieta Almada
"Un año más"	2006	Televisa
"Lentamente"	2009	Luis Cage
"Let me show you"	2009	Luis Cage
"Provócame"	2009	Manuel "Chivo" Escalante
