= Dulce Tentación =

Studio album by Fey
- Released: April 28, 2009 (limited); May 5, 2009
- Recorded: 2007–2008
- Genres: Electropop, pop rock
- Length: 44:26 (Standard edition); 44:40 (Itunes edition)
- Label: Mi Rey Music
- Producer: Sam "Fish" Fisher

Fey chronology
Faltan Lunas (2006)	Dulce Tentación (2009)	Fey: Primera Fila (2012)

Singles from Dulce Tentación
- 1. "Cicatrices" Released: September 8, 2008; 2. "Lentamente" Released: February 10, 2009; 3. "Provócame" Released: June 12, 2009; 4. "Adicto A Mi Cuerpo" Released: January 25, 2010

Dulce Tentación (Sweet Temptation) is the seventh studio album by Mexican pop/dance singer Fey. It was officially released on May 5, 2009. This is her first and only album by far to be released on an independent label (Mi Rey Music) and is also her first in three years.

== Album production ==
Fey calls the album "sensual, powerful and different; that's exactly the way I see women at this moment." The sound of the album itself follows the electronic and rhythmic influences of her previous albums. The singer also cited glam rock as an inspiration for the songs and the promotional work used to promote the album. This "glam rock" look is also a part of the look she now uses.

Sam "Fish" Fisher (Marilyn Manson, Duran Duran and Daddy Yankee), Cynthia M. Camacho, Francisco Gil (Fey's Brother) and Fey herself worked as writers and composers on the album. It also includes a song which is an outtake from Tierna La Noche, produced by José Ramón Flores, as well as an outtake from Vértigo called "In Your Dreams."

== Album art ==
The cover for "Dulce Tentación" was again designed by Fey's longtime friend Sergio Toporek, who previously designed her Tierna La Noche and El Color de los Sueños albums. "Dulce Tentación" has two alternative covers.

== Promotion and reception ==
Professional ratings
Review scores
Source	Rating
Allmusic	(favorable)
The Dreamers.com	(9/10)
La Vibra	(Positive)

Fey began to distribute her new material via the internet after it was announced that she was in the process of recording a new album through an independent record label. "Cicatrices" was the first track leaked, which was available for download on Fey's official website at the end of 2008. On January 23, 2009, an unedited version of "Lentamente" track was uploaded to YouTube with previews of additional songs on the upcoming album. On April 21, the complete album leaked onto the internet.

Fey began promotion in Europe in the beginning of 2009 with plans to tour the USA.

The album debuted at number 24 in the official AMPROFON Mexican Top 100 chart, climbing as high as number 2 that same week in the prime Mexican music store Mixup's Spanish albums top ten. In the United States, Dulce Tentación reached the top position in the Latin Pop section of the USA's iTunes, as well as the top five of the overall iTunes Latin department.

On the week ending May 17, 2009, Dulce Tentación reached #8 on the AMPROFON top 10, and reached #5 the following week. That same week, "Lentamente" entered the top five of Exa FM and Los 40 Principales, two of the most important pop stations of Mexico. "Lentamente" became her first #1 hit since "La Fuerza Del Destino", after it reached the top of the Airplay Charts. It also reached #10 in the overall Latin American singles chart.

In the first month of release, the album sold 50,000 copies in Mexico alone. The album is yet to be released worldwide.

A review by U.S. Latino newspaper La Vibra praised the album, claiming the singer is one of the few Latin artists to keep up with her American and European contemporaries. The review also praises Fey's ability to reinvent herself as a progressive pop artist.

"Provócame", the second official single from the album, has already begun to play in heavy rotation on Mexican radio stations, reaching high positions in online popularity rankings, including #2 on OYE's Hot Parade.

A remixed version of Dulce Tentación was under production and was to be titled "Dulce Tentacion: The Remixes". The project was slated as Fey began work on her next studio album.

== Singles ==
- "Cicatrices" ("Monsters") was released as a promo-only single on September 8, 2008.
- On February 10, "Lentamente" ("Let Me Show You") was officially released as the first single on the Mexican radio station "Oye FM". This single became her first #1 on the Mexican radio since "La Fuerza del Destino" came out in 2004. There exist a music video for the song first aired in March 2009 and was directed by 3D director Luis Cage. The video was well received in MTV Latin America.
- The second single is "Provócame" ("Games That You Play"), and it was released on June 12, 2009. So far it has peaked at #16 in Mexican radio, and at #26 on iTunes. The music video for the single was filmed in finally August 2009 by Mexican director Chivo (Manuel Escalante) and was premiered on September 22, 2009, on her official YouTube page.
- The third single is "Adicto a mi Cuerpo" ("Guilty Pleasure"), which was announced on Fey's official Twitter on January 25, 2010. Fey stated in a fan club chat that she was looking into finding someone to capture her vision for the music video in order to start filming it. Filming for the music video was slated as Fey has begun work on her next studio album.

== Track listing ==
The album contains 11 songs in Spanish plus one bonus remix of "Cicatrices".

Track	Title	Writer(s)	Producer(s)	Time
1.	"Provócame"	María Fernanda Blázquez Gil "Fey", José Francisco Blázquez Gil & Tiziano Borghi	Sam "Fish" Fisher	4:06
2.	"Dulce Manzana"	María Fernanda Blázquez Gil "Fey", José Francisco Blázquez Gil & Sam "Fish" Fisher	Sam "Fish" Fisher	3:23
3.	"Lentamente"	Sam "Fish" Fisher & Cynthia Camacho	Sam "Fish" Fisher	3:42
4.	"Adicto A Mi Cuerpo"	María Fernanda Blázquez Gil "Fey", José Francisco Blázquez Gil & Sam "Fish" Fisher	Sam "Fish" Fisher	3:00
5.	"Cicatrices"	María Fernanda Blázquez Gil "Fey", José Francisco Blázquez Gil, Sam "Fish" Fisher & Cynthia Camacho	Sam "Fish" Fisher	3:48
6.	"Sirena De Cristal"	María Fernanda Blázquez Gil "Fey", José Francisco Blázquez Gil & Sam "Fish" Fisher	Sam "Fish" Fisher	3:30
7.	"La Viuda Negra"	María Fernanda Blázquez Gil "Fey", José Francisco Blázquez Gil & Tiziano Borghi	Sam "Fish" Fisher	3:15
8.	"La Fragilidad"	María Fernanda Blázquez Gil "Fey", José Francisco Blázquez Gil & Tiziano Borghi	Sam "Fish" Fisher	3:39
9.	"Dolerá"	María Fernanda Blázquez Gil "Fey", José Francisco Blázquez Gil & Sam "Fish" Fisher	Sam "Fish" Fisher	3:54
10.	"Borrando La Historia"	María Fernanda Blázquez Gil "Fey", José Francisco Blázquez Gil & Tiziano Borghi	Sam "Fish" Fisher	3:15 (Standard Edition) /3:29 (iTunes Edition)
11.	"Volviendo a Empezar"	María Fernanda Blázquez Gil "Fey", José Francisco Blázquez Gil & Tiziano Borghi	Sam "Fish" Fisher, Fey & José Portilla	3:18
12.	"Cicatrices (Bearlin Club Mix - José "Spinnin" Cortés Remix)"; Bonus track: Remix winner from FeyRemix.com	María Fernanda Blázquez Gil "Fey", José Francisco Blázquez Gil, Sam "Fish" Fisher & Cynthia Camacho	Samuel "Fish" Fisher & José "Spinnin" Cortés	5:31

Note: In the standard version of the album, the length of the song "Borrando la historia" is 3:15 but there is another extended version of the song who is available in the iTunes Edition, its length is 3:29.

== "Sweet Temptation" ==
On August 3, 2009, "Sweet Temptation" (the English version of "Sweet Temptation") was leaked through Mi Rey Music's website, following Fey's departure from the label. The album saw the light of day officially through Streaming platforms in 2018, but in 2020 it was removed from all platforms.

The track listing consists entirely of English versions of the songs included in the Spanish version of the album:

1. Games That You Play (Provócame)
2. Sweet As Sin (Dulce Manzana)
3. Let Me Show You (Lentamente)
4. Guilty Pleasure (Adicto A Mi Cuerpo)
5. Monsters (Cicatrices)
6. In Your Dreams (Sirena De Cristal)
7. Devil's Angel (La Viuda Negra)
8. Loneliness (La Fragilidad)
9. No More Lies (Dolerá)
10. Your Game Is Over (Borrando La Historia)
11. Sweet Agony (Volviendo A Empezar)

== Certifications, peaks and sales ==
Chart (2009)	Peak position	Certification	Sales
Mexican Amprofon Top 100	5	Gold	50,000
Mexican Amprofon Mexican Albums	3	Gold	50,000

== Sweet Temptation Tour ==
Fey began her Official Sweet Temptation Tour in Mexico City by opening the GMF Ciudad de Mexico where she gave a live set of all her classics from Media Naranja to Lentamente. Fey was responsible to inaugurate this festival in Mexico, followed by Fangoria and Alejandra Guzmán. Critics said it was a great concert that was at the level of any International Pop Star and a beautiful glimpse at Fey's future.

Date	City, State	Venue
August 5, 2009	Mexico City	Expo Reforma

Fey continued her Sweet Temptation Tour by performing in clubs all over the United States. She had a preview concert during the Mexican G-Fest singing songs from her albums Fey, Tierna La Noche, El Color de los Sueños, Vertigo, La Fuerza Del Destino, and Dulce Tentacion.

Set List:

- Let Me Show You
- Medley: Media Naranja, Azúcar Amargo, La Noche Se Mueve
- Provocame
- Barco A Venus
- Muevelo
- Lentamente

Date	City, State	Venue
August 27, 2009	Dallas, Texas	Kaliente Nightclub
August 28, 2009	Houston, Texas	Club Krystal
September 3, 2009	Chicago, Illinois	Circuit Nightclub
September 4, 2009	Scottsdale, Arizona	Forbidden Nightclub
September 6, 2009	West Hollywood, California	Factory Event Space
September 11, 2009	Sacramento, California	Faces
September 12, 2009	San Diego, California	Rich's
November 6, 2009	Atlanta, Georgia	Chaparral
November 8, 2009	Las Vegas, Nevada	Piranha Nightclub

The tour was restarted as a stadium tour with show dates set in Latin America and the United States. Fey had confirmed that the world tour would begin in 2009 in Argentina, the home country of Fey's late mother. In December 2009, Fey's record label released a statement saying that all tour dates had been cancelled due to contract obligations not having been met.

Date	City, State	Venue
November 23, 2009 (cancelled)	Buenos Aires, Argentina	Luna Park
November 25, 2009 (cancelled)	Montevideo, Uruguay	Cine Plaza
December 9, 2009 (cancelled)	Buenos Aires, Argentina	Teatro Astral
December 10, 2009 (cancelled)	Buenos Aires, Argentina	Teatro Astral
December 17, 2009 (cancelled)	Santiago, Chile	Movistar Arena Stadium
