= Amargo =

Amargo may refer to:

- Boron, California, formerly named Amargo
- "Azúcar amargo", a song by Mexican singer Fey
- Quassia amara, a plant used in traditional medicine
