= Lentamente =

Lentamente may refer to:

- "Lentamente", a 2009 song by Fey from Dulce Tentación
- "Lentamente", a 2023 song by Ana Mena from Bellodrama
- "Lentamente" (Irama song), a 2025 song by Irama
