= La fuerza del destino =

La Fuerza del Destino ("The Force of Destiny") may refer to:

- La Fuerza del Destino (album), a 2004 album by Mexican singer Fey
- La fuerza del destino (TV series), a 2011 Mexican telenovela
- "La Fuerza del Destino", a 1988 song by Mecano from their album Descanso Dominical

== See also ==
- La forza del destino, an 1862 opera by Giuseppe Verdi
