= Métodos de Placer Instantáneo =

Studio album by Aleks Syntek
- Released: February 9, 2010
- Recorded: 2008–2009
- Genre: Latin pop · Pop rock · Electropop · Funk music
- Length: 37:52
- Language: Spanish
- Label: EMI Televisa Music
- Producer: Ramiro Figueroa

Aleks Syntek chronology
1999–2009 (2009)	Métodos de Placer Instantáneo (2010)	Syntek (2012)

Singles from Métodos de Placer Instantáneo
- 1. "Loca" Released: August 3, 2009; 2. "Más de mil años" Released: January 11, 2010; 3. "Sin motor" Released: May 3, 2010; 4. "Desvanecer" Released: August 2, 2010; 5. "Mamá Naturaleza" Released: October 25, 2010

Professional ratings
Review scores
Source	Rating
Allmusic	3.5/5 stars

Métodos de Placer Instantáneo is the fourth studio album recorded by Mexican singer-songwriter Aleks Syntek. It was released by EMI Televisa Music on February 9, 2010. The first single "Loca" was the opening theme of the Mexican telenovela Los Exitosos Perez. The music would be performed by RBD but was abandoned. The album received a 2010 Latin Grammy Award nomination for Best Male Pop Vocal Album.

== Track listing ==
No.	Title	Length
1.	"Ese mal gusto" (A capella)	3:37
2.	"Sin motor"	3:35
3.	"Más de 1000 años"	4:13
4.	"Desvanecer"	4:13
5.	"Mujer animal" (featuring Rubén Blades)	4:48
6.	"La ruta del destino"	4:15
7.	"Estoy perdido"	3:33
8.	"Loca"	3:59
9.	"Ángel de luz"	3:57
10.	"Amalia"	3:51

=== Special edition ===
No.	Title	Length
11.	"Mamá naturaleza"	x:xx
12.	"Regalando amor"	x:xx

=== Official remixes ===
No.	Title	Length
13.	"Loca ^{(Motora Remix by Kinky)}"	5:15
14.	"Loca ^{(Digi + Gabo Remix)}"	5:48
15.	"Más de 1000 Años ^{(Digi + Gabo Remix)}"	x:xx
16.	"Más de 1000 Años ^{(Mijangos Fly 406 Remix)}"	x:xx
17.	"Más de 1000 Años ^{(Mijangos Fly 406 Radio Edit Remix)}"	x:xx

=== iTunes ===
No.	Title	Length
1.	"Sin motor ^{(Orchestra version)}"	3:39
2.	"Loca ^{(Acoustic Version iTunes Originals)}"	4:37
3.	"Más de 1000 Años ^{(Acoustic Version iTunes Originals)}"	4:07

== Certifications ==
Region	Certification	Certified units/sales
Mexico (AMPROFON)	Gold	30,000^{^}
^{^} Shipments figures based on certification alone.
