= Todo lo Que Soy – En Vivo =

Todo Lo Que Soy-En Vivo

Live album by Fey
- Released: December 17, 2014 (Mexico) December 24, 2014 Digital (Worldwide)
- Recorded: April 21, 2013
- Genre: Power pop, synthpop, pop, acoustic
- Label: Sony Music, RCA

Fey chronology
Fey: Primera Fila (2012)	Todo Lo Que Soy-En Vivo (2014)	FEY HITS TOUR EN VIVO (2026)

Singles from Todo Lo Que Soy-En Vivo

Todo Lo Que Soy-En Vivo is a live album by Mexican pop singer Fey. The album was recorded in Mexico City's National Auditorium after the success of her Fey: Primera Fila album. Fey toured this show in various venues in Mexico, with many sold out dates and dates were added due to popular demand. Before going in for an encore performance at the National Auditorium in April 2014, Fey had confirmed that would be the concert date she would record the show in a CD & DVD format. The album was originally slated for a summer 2014 release, but was delayed due to Fey wanting to be involved in the details of the editing process. On December 11, 2014, Fey confirmed via Twitter that the CD & DVD format would be released on December 17, 2014 and the digital version would go worldwide on December 24, 2014 along with the cover art.

With the exception of the album Faltan Lunas, Fey performs songs from all previous albums in the show. The show's title was taken from a line in her song, Me Haces Tanta Falta, which also signified that her show would reflect Todo Lo Que Soy, or All That I Am.

== CD Track listing ==
1. Frio
2. Te Pertenezco
3. Diselo Con Flores
4. Gatos en el Balcón
5. Desmargaritando el Corazón
6. Me Enamoro De Ti
7. Tierna La Noche
8. Cielo Liquido
9. Lentamente
10. Se Lo Que Vendra
11. Dressing to Kill
12. La Noche Se Mueve
13. Azucar Amargo
14. Media Naranja
15. Muevelo

== DVD Track listing ==
1. Frio
2. Te Pertenezco
3. Diselo Con Flores
4. Gatos en el Balcón
5. Desmargaritando el Corazón
6. Me Haces Tanta Falta
7. Me Enamoro De Ti
8. Tierna La Noche
9. Cielo Liquido
10. Lentamente
11. Se Lo Que Vendra
12. Dressing to Kill
13. La Noche Se Mueve
14. Azucar Amargo
15. Media Naranja
16. Muevelo

Note: Though performed at the shows, Barco a Venus, Ni Tu Ni Nadie, Canela, and Subidon were not added to neither the CD nor DVD track listings.

== Charts ==
Chart (2015)	Peak position
Mexican Albums (AMPROFON)	21

== Tour ==
Date	City, State	Venue
May 15, 2015	Los Angeles, California	Circus Disco
May 17, 2015	Long Beach, California	Latin Stage
