= Más Fuerte De Lo Que Pensaba =

Más Fuerte de lo Que Pensaba

Studio album by Aleks Syntek y La Gente Normal
- Released: March 22, 1993
- Recorded: 1992
- Genre: Pop
- Label: EMI Televisa Music

Aleks Syntek y La Gente Normal chronology
Hey Tú! (1990)	Más Fuerte de lo Que Pensaba (1993)	Bienvenido a La Vida (1995)

Más Fuerte de lo Que Pensaba (Stronger Than I Thought) is the second studio album released by Mexican singer-songwriter Aleks Syntek and his band La Gente Normal. It was released by EMI Televisa Music on March 22, 1993.

== Track listing ==
1. "El Camino" - 4:12
2. "Prefiero" - 3:33
3. "Más Fuerte de lo Que Pensaba" - 4:16
4. "Cuando Estoy Contigo" - 3:29
5. "Nuestras Costumbres" - 3:39
6. "Un Espacio Para Andar" - 4:32
7. "Lo Perfecto" - 3:37
8. "La Tierra Por Conquistar" - 4:14
9. "Mis Impulsos Sobre Ti" - 4:33
10. "La Historia de Un Hombre" - 3:48
11. "Nadie Más Que Yo" - 3:48
12. "Rompiendo la Rutina" - 4:27
13. "En el Carnaval" - 3:44
14. "Mis Impulsos Sobre Ti" – (acoustic version) - 3:12

== Sales ==
Region	Certification	Certified units/sales
Mexico 1993 sales	—	100,000
