= 89–99 =

89=99

Compilation album by Aleks Syntek
- Released: October 24, 1999
- Recorded: 1989–99
- Genre: Pop
- Label: EMI Televisa Music

Aleks Syntek chronology
Lugar Secreto (1997)	89=99 (1999)	Sexo, pudor y lágrimas (1999)

Professional ratings
Review scores
Source	Rating
Allmusic	4/5 stars

89=99 is the first compilation album by Mexican pop singer Aleks Syntek, released on October 24, 1999. It was certified Double Platinum in Mexico.

== Track listing ==
All tracks are written by Aleks Syntek, except where noted.

No.	Title	Length
1.	"Tu Necesitas"	5:01
2.	"Sintonizacion"	3:50
3.	"Una Pequeña Parte De Ti"	3:13
4.	"Unos Quieren Subir"	3:20
5.	"El Camino"	4:18
6.	"Mas Fuerte De Lo Que Pensaba"	4:16
7.	"Mis Impulsos Sobre Ti"	4:35
8.	"La Fe De Antes"	4:41
9.	"Evolucion" (version Bristol)	3:50
10.	"Bienvenido A La Vida"	4:59
11.	"Volando Bajo"	5:40
12.	"Sin Ti"	4:20
13.	"Lindas Criaturitas"	3:48
14.	"Preso" (Rafael Pérez-Botija)	4:52
15.	"Sexo, Pudor Y Lagrimas"	3:56

== Singles ==
- Sexo, pudor y lagrimas (Music Video): premiered in November 16, 1999
- Tú necesitas (Music Video): premiered in July 3, 2000

== Personnel ==
- Aleks Syntek – vocals

== Sales and certifications ==
Region	Certification	Certified units/sales
Mexico (AMPROFON)	2× Platinum	300,000^{^}
^{^} Shipments figures based on certification alone.
