= Cynthia Nilson =

- Born: August 22, 1970 (age 56); Buenos Aires, Argentina
- Occupations: Singer, songwriter
- Spouse: Darío Moscatelli
- Musical career
- Genre: Pop
- Instruments: Vocals; guitar
- Years active: 1991-present

Cynthia Sara Nilson (born August 22, 1970), also known as Cynthia Nilson, is an Argentine pop singer and songwriter.

== Career ==
She began singing professionally with her father Carlos Nilson in several songs for Argentine television shows like Ritmo de la Noche starring Marcelo Tinelli, Jugate Conmigo and Verano del '98 with Cris Morena. In the 1990s, she began performing with her own rock bands until 1995 the Argentinian pop group the Sacados hired Nilson to sing and play keyboards during their Colombian tour with Shakira and since then has been the Sacados' vocalist till present. She also sang the lead song of Verano del '98, a hit song from a famous television series. She has collaborated in many records as a writer and singer with Julio Iglesias, Ricardo Montaner, Azúcar Moreno, Alexandre Pires, Kelly Clarkson, Shaila Durcal, Noelia, Patricia Manterola, Aracely Arambula, Tierra Cero, Ninel Conde, Twiggy, Machito Ponce, Cynthia, Kika, Edgar, Pilar Montenegro, and Don Omar. She also wrote music for other Mexican television series, including La Jaula de Oro and El Amor no tiene Precio. She is an ASCAP award winner and has been nominated for several Grammy Awards. Cynthia Nilson appears on the 90s Pop Tour vol 2 cd and DVD, and on the new 2019 90s pop CD /DVD 90s Tour Volumen 3.

== Personal life ==
Cynthia is married to Darío Moscatelli, Music Producer and The Sacados leader. She lives in Miami, Florida with her husband and children.

== Discography ==
- 1996 - Laberinto de Canciones (The Sacados) BMG
- 1998 - Mucho Mejor (The Sacados) BMG
- 1998 - Verano del 98 Sony Music
- 1999 - Verano del 98 (2) Sony Music
- 2003 - Estrella Guia (Alexandre Pires) ASCAP Award Winner and 2 Grammy Awards Nominee.
- 2000 - De Onda (The sacados) BMG
- 2006 - Navidad con Amigos EMI Televisa
- 2006 - 40 grados (Noelia) (songwriter & background vocals)
- 2006 - Dispuesto an amarte (Luciano Pereyra) EMI
- 2007 - Volverte a ver (Noelia) 2007 EMI TELEVISA
- 2007 - Bailando con Lola (Azucar Moreno) Emi ( songwriter & background vocals)
- 2008 - La musica de los Valores TELEVISA /
- 2010 - Superexitos (The Sacados) 2010 Independiente, iTunes, Amazon.
- 2011 - Las cosas son como son (Ricardo Montaner) 2011 EMI (songwriter & background vocals)
- 2012 - El Viajero Frecuente (Ricardo Montaner 2012 Sony Music) Background Vocals
- 2014 - Agradecido (Ricardo Montaner) Sony Music
- 2016 - Ida y vuelta (Ricardo Montaner) Sony Music
- 2017 - Inmenso -Puma Rodriguez Sony Music

2018 90s Pop Tout Vol 2, Sony Music .The Sacados 2019 90s Pop Tour Vol 3 . The Sacados
