= 1998 Billboard Latin Music Awards =

5th annual Billboard Latin Music Awards

- Date: April, 1998
- Venue: Fontainebleau Hotel, Miami Beach, Florida, United States

The 5th annual Billboard Latin Music Awards which honor the most popular albums, songs, and performers in Latin music took place in Miami.

== Pop ==
=== Hot latin tracks of the year ===
- Lo Mejor de Mí — Cristian Castro

=== Pop album of the year, Male ===
- Romances — Luis Miguel

=== Pop album of the year, female ===
- Tierna La Noche — Fey

=== Pop album of the year, duo or group ===
- Compas — Gipsy Kings

=== Pop album of the year, new artist ===
- Evolution — Boyz II Men

== Tropical/Salsa ==
=== Tropical/salsa song of the year ===
- Y Hubo Alguien — Marc Anthony

=== Tropical/salsa album of the year, male ===
- Contra la Corriente — Marc Anthony

=== Tropical/salsa album of the year, female ===
- Llévame Contigo — Olga Tañon

=== Tropical/salsa album of the year, duo or group ===
- Buena Vista Social Club — Buena Vista Social Club

== Regional Mexican ==
=== Regional Mexican song of the year ===
- Ya Me Voy para Siempre — Los Temerarios

=== Regional Mexican album of the year, male ===
- Recuerdo Especial — Michael Salgado

=== Regional Mexican album of the year, female ===
- Con un mismo corazón — Ana Gabriel

=== Regional Mexican album of the year, duo or group ===
- Partiéndome El Alma — Grupo Límite

== Other awards ==
=== Billboard latin 50 artist of the year ===
- Luis Miguel

=== Billboard latin 50 album of the year ===
- Juntos Otra Vez (Juan Gabriel and Rocío Dúrcal album)

=== Hot latin tracks artist of the year ===
- Enrique Iglesias

=== Latin rap album of the year ===
- Rebotando — Ilegales

=== Latin rock album of the year ===
- Sueños Líquidos — Maná

=== Contemporary Latin jazz album of the year ===
- Passion Dance — Herb Alpert

=== Latin dance single of the year ===
- Mueve La Cadera (Move your Hips) — Proyecto Uno

=== Songwriter of the year ===
- Marco Antonio Solís

=== Publisher of the year ===
- Bmg Songs

=== Publishing corporation of the year ===
- Sony/Atv Music

=== Producer of the year ===
- Rafael Perez Botija

=== Spirit Of Hope ===
- Willy Chirino

=== Billboard Lifetime achievement award ===
- Ralph Mercado

=== Billboard Latin Music Hall of Fame ===
- Vicente Fernández
