= Jeans (band) =

Mexican girl group

JNS
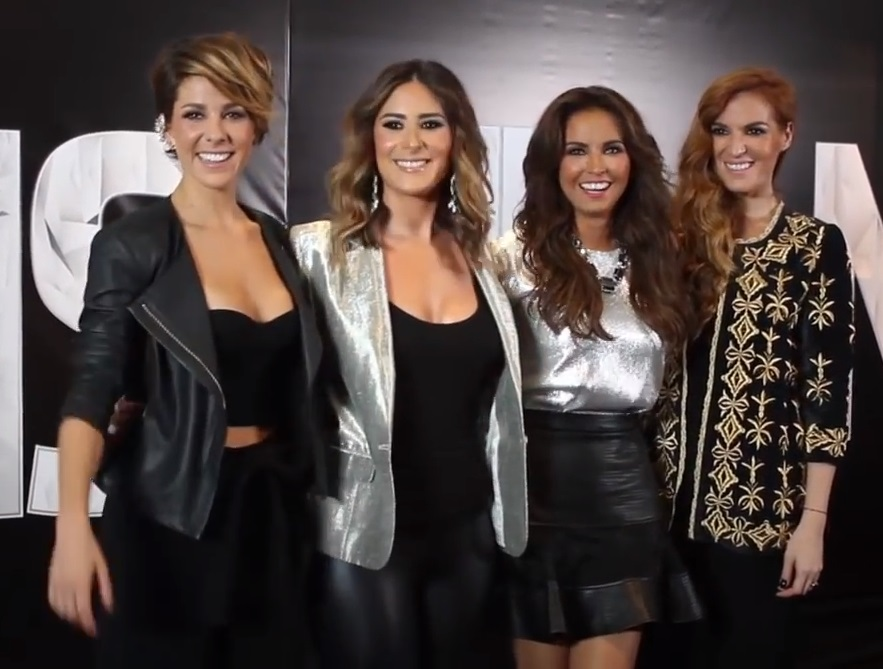

Background information
- Origin: Mexico
- Genres: Teen pop; pop; dance-pop
- Years active: 1996–2008, 2015-present
- Labels: AP; Quimera Sound; BMG; EMI; Sony Music; Univisión
- Members: Melissa López; Regina Murguía; Angie Taddei
- Past members: (see below)
- Website: grupojeans.com (Defunct)

JNS (previously known as the Jeans) is a Mexican girl group that rose to fame in late 1996 and 1997 and continued until 2008. In 2015, the band reunited and got back together and went on tour. In 2017, they released their seventh studio album, titled Metamorfosis.

Initially created in 1994 by band member Patricia Sirvent with five members, after one of them dropped out of the project before the first album was recorded in 1996, the group remained as a four-piece until 2007 when it changed into a three-piece after changes in each of their albums, one of these included Dulce María (from 2000-2002), who would later become part of the successful Mexican pop group RBD.

The group released six studio albums (plus a full re-working of one of their albums) in the course of 12 years.

== Discography & singles ==
All of the songs that the group recorded were sung in Spanish. Almost immediately upon stepping into the Mexican scene they saw success with the release of their first two singles "Pepe" and "Me Pongo Mis Jeans" (1996), both, taken from their self-titled album Jeans; soon after, Litzy left the band. It was not until the release of their second album in 1998, ¿Por Qué Disimular?, that they achieved their biggest success with the leading single, "Enferma De Amor" (1998), which later became their signature song and their best-known single, with Karla Díaz and Melissa Lopez as the new members. However, from their third album on, while remaining a fixture in the music scene and still relevant, they never achieved the same degree of success.

In 2003, the band re-released their fourth album, Cuatro para las Cuatro, with re-worked versions of the songs included in it, changing them from pop to grupera. In 2007, a compilation album (with an accompanying DVD) was released that included new versions of their best-known songs.

=== Studio albums ===
- 1996: Jeans (EMI)
- 1998: ¿Por qué disimular? (EMI)
- 1999: //:Tr3s.Jeans (EMI).
- 2001: Cuarto para las Cuatro (BMG)
- 2003: Cuarto para las Cuatro II (BMG) (The album is a re-worked version of the original)
- 2004: Ammore (Univisión Music)
- 2006: Porque Soy Libre (EMI/Quimera Sound)
- 2017: Metamorfosis (Sony Music)

=== Compilation albums ===
- 2001: Lo Mejor de Jeans (EMI)
- 2007: 12 Años (EMI/Quimera Sound)

=== Live albums ===
- 2008: El Adiós de Jeans (EMI/Quimera Sound)
- 2015: Dèjá Vu (Sony Music)
- 2016: 20 Años — En Vivo (Sony Music)

== Band members ==
The group went through constant changes during their whole time together, even before formalizing the project when the group was created in 1994. Most of the members in the group would depart due to disagreements with manager Alejandro Sirvent (father of group member founder Patricia Sirvent) which would become source of controversy for the group and the way it was managed, with the exception of Dulce María as not only she was close with the band but the reason for her departure from the group was mostly due to landing the main role of Marcela Majía in the 2002 telenovela, Clase 406. In each of the albums the group saw a change in their line-up. During the first 12 years of the group before they reunited in 2015, a total of 13 girls became (in a more or less relevant way) part of the group.

Members

- Melissa López Zendejas (1997–1999) (2015–Present). (Replacing Litzy)
- Regina Murgía Payes (1999–2002) (2015–Present). (Replacing Melissa)
- María de los Ángeles (Angie) Taddei Cella (1994-2000) (2015–Present). (Original member)

Former members

- Patricia Sirvent Bartón (1994–2008). (Original member)
- Litzy Vannya Domínguez Balderas (1994–1997). (Original member)
- Tabatha Vizzuet Sepulveda (1994–1997).(Original member)
- Bianca Carrasco (1994-1995). (Original member)
- Karla Haydeé Díaz-Leal Arreguín (1997–2008) (2015–2024). (Replacing Tabatha)
- Dulce María (2000–2002). (Replacing "Angie")
- Elizabeth Amiel Tena Hernández (2002–2005). (Replacing Regina)
- Valeria Maza Matheu (2002–2004). (Replacing Dulce)
- Sabrina Rodríguez Dalia Chiara (2004–2007). (Replacing Valeria)
- Marcela García Cruz (2005–2008). (Replacing Amiel)

=== After the group ===
- Dulce María would become part of the successful group RBD from 2004 to 2009, after the group disintegrated, she started a solo career releasing an album in November 2010.
- Two of the band members, Melissa and Angie, would reunite to create a TV show PicNic in the Mexican cable-based channel Telehit (Part of Televisa) in 2004.
- Litzy became a solo artist releasing three moderately successful studio albums in 1998, 1999 and 2004. And she went on to achieve fame as protagonist in six telenovelas, singing the entrada in some of them and being featured as a singer in the plot of three of them. In 1999 she starred in the telenovela DKDA where she was the female protagonist and featured in the soundtrack of this telenovela; however, she was forced to resign midway during production due to an illness. But she went on to star in Daniela (singing the entrada, "Sobrevivere"). Then she won a reality acting contest entitled Protagonistas de la Fama propelling her to be female protagonist in Amarte Asi (singing the entrada, featured as a mariachi singer in the story). She followed that up with protagonist roles in Pecadora (featured as a bar top singer, singing the ending theme song of the telenovela also), Quiéreme Tonto, and Una Maid en Manhattan.
- Group member Angie also launched a less successful solo career in 2002 releasing only one album.
- Regina Murguía went on to do some tv shows and also participated on a reality tv show called la isla for its third season.
- Karla Diaz-Leal also participated on the reality tv show called la isla for its fourth season.

== Tours ==
- Metamorphosis Tour (2022)

Date (2022)	City	Country	Venue
July 15	Toluca	Mexico	Teatro Morelos
July 22	Pachuca	Mexico	Palenque de la Feria
August 5	San Luis Potosí	Mexico	Palenque Fenapo
August 13	Morelia	Mexico	Palacio del Arte
August 18	Huamantla	Mexico	Teatro del Pueblo de la Feria
September 22	Mexico City	Mexico	La Maraka
October 14	Laredo	United States	Sames Auto Arena
