= The Sacados =

- Origin: Buenos Aires, Argentina
- Genres: House, hip house, pop
- Years active: 1990–present
- Members: Dario Moscatelli; Cynthia Nilson

The Sacados is an Argentine musical group, active since the 1990s and consisting of Darío Moscatelli (born January 27, 1966) and Cynthia Nilson.

== History ==
The Sacados was born as a project in Buenos Aires at the beginning of 1990. In those days the house sound, with its clearly danceable rhythm, swept the rankings of Europe and the United States, and was undoubtedly the main course of the clubs of Buenos Aires. The irresistible rhythm of their songs, added to a strong visual impact, supported by the costumes and choreography, gave the group its characteristic stamp. Their originality was the first step that would lead them to success. The appearance of "Ritmo de la Noche" was the definitive explosion. Obligatory theme in all records, permanently broadcast on the radio and even disputed by several TV programs as a musical curtain. The Sacados became the most popular group in Argentina that summer. The first big tour started on December 6, 1990 in Buenos Aires and lasted until September of 1991, after 114 presentations in Argentina, Uruguay and Paraguay. That debut album, "Te pido más respeto", was certified gold and platinum and set sales records throughout Latin America. That same year they made their first presentation in Chile together with Technotronic. After the recording of "The Sacados Contratacan" they left for Central America on a promotional tour that covered Venezuela, Costa Rica, El Salvador and Mexico. 1992 definitively opened the doors of the Latin market after its successful presentation at the Festival de la Cancion in Villa del Mar, Chile. From then on there were two tours of that country (thirty-one concerts, from Arica to Punta Arenas), Peru, Bolivia and Mexico. To close the year, a compilation of the first two works was published in Spain. Volume III had special editions for Chile (five songs not included in the national version) and Central America, where "Me Pica" quickly became a hit. Their presentation tour concluded in July 1993 with a massive concert in the Plaza del Camino Real in Guatemala, where they obtained the Silver disc in recognition of their sales. After a brief hiatus, they released "Asunto Chino", an album that shows them more solid and mature, with an inclination more towards pop.

== Discography ==
Albums
Year	Title	Singles
1990	Te pido + respeto	"Manué", "Bikini a Lunares amarillo", "Ritmo de la noche '90", "Hey Doctor".
1991	Contraatacan	"Corre González", "La Primavera", "Sabes mi numero?", "Hablándole a la pared"
1992	Volumen III	"Me pica"
1993	Asunto chino	"Paren de venir", "Más de lo que te imaginas".
1995	Alter nativo	"Más de lo que te imaginas (Live Rmx 95)"
1996	Laberinto de canciones (con la participación de Rosana Cortez, Mónica Badoglio y Cynthia Nilson)	"Calor", "Pensando en esa chica"
1998	Mucho mejor (con la participación de Darío Moscatelli y Cynthia Nilson)	

Greatest hits
Year	Title	Singles
2000	De onda, grandes éxitos: 1990-2000 (odas nuevas versiones Darío Moscatelli y Cynthia Nilson)	
2009	Super éxitos (Nuevas versiones de los ya conocidos éxitos más tres temas nuevos, entre ellos Bye Bye Sol. Cantados por Darío Moscatelli y Cynthia Nilson)	"Bye bye Sol"
2012	SuperExitos Vol 2 (Nuevas versiones de los ya conocidos éxitos Cantados por Darío Moscatelli y Cynthia Nilson, Producido por Dario Moscatelli)	

2018 90s Pop Tour Sony Music

2018 90s Pop Tou Vol 2 Sony Music

2019 90s Pop Tour Vol 3 Sony Music
