= Aleks Syntek =

Mexican singer and songwriter

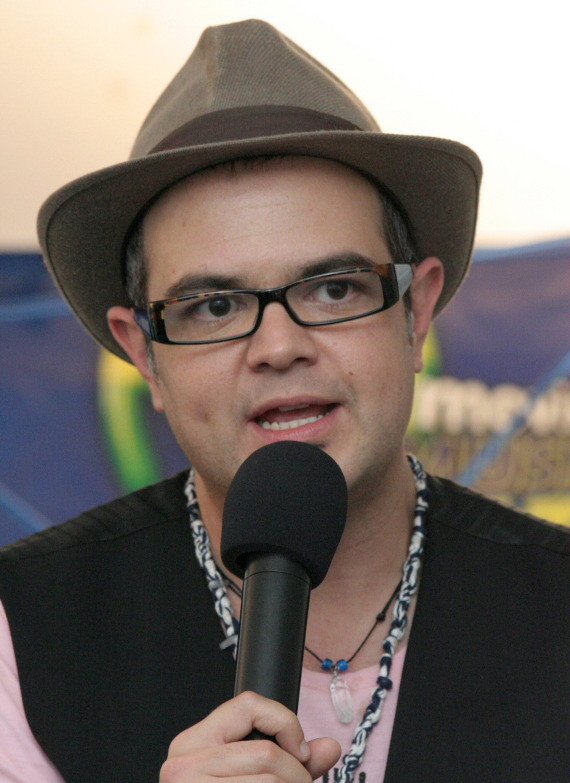
- Aleks Syntek in 2008

Background information
- Born: Raúl Alejandro Escajadillo Peña; 29 September 1969 (age 57)
- Origin: Merida, Yucatán, Mexico
- Genres: Synth-pop; Latin pop; Pop rock; Latin ballad; Electropop; reggae
- Occupations: Singer; songwriter
- Instruments: Vocals; keyboards; guitar
- Years active: 1979–present
- Labels: EMI; Sony
- Formerly of: Aleks Syntek y la Gente Normal
- Website: aleksyntek.com

Raúl Alejandro Escajadillo Peña (born 29 September 1969), known by his stage name Aleks Syntek, is a Mexican singer and songwriter. He has earned nine nominations for the Latin Grammy Awards, a Grammy nomination, five nominations for the MTV Latin Awards, and is the winner of three Latin Billboard awards. He has also received an Ariel Award from the Mexican Academy of Cinematography for Best Film Music.

As a performer and singer Syntek has released 10 albums receiving Gold and Platinum disc awards for high sales. He has earned special awards such as "The Honor Composer Achievement Award" presented by the Univision Network by actor Edward James Olmos and also "The Music Legacy Award" presented by the North American Society of Composers SESAC. Syntek also starred and pioneered the hit show The Voice in Mexico.

== Career ==
As a child, Syntek began his artistic career by acting in television commercials during the late 1970s, subsequently participating in the Pinwheel program produced by RTC, and then as a comedian in Alegrias de medio día (infantil) in 1979 which later led to the hit TV show "Chiquilladas" broadcast on Televisa in the first half of the decade of the 1980s. After leaving the program he decided to devote himself to the world of music and began working as an assistant and programmer in music recording studios. He was nicknamed "Syntek" by his friends because of a peculiar event: Syntek at that time did not have enough money to buy a keyboard, so he would borrow them from friends; this situation led him to be known as "El sin Teclados" (The Keyboard-less, in Spanish) after which he derived the name Syntek. After having participated with members of the group Caifanes to form the band "Pistolas de Platino" and then joining "Kenny y los Eléctricos" until 1989, he formed his own group called Aleks Syntek y la Gente Normal.

Syntek is an international self-taught artist and is on the board of the "Sociedad de Autores y Compositores de México".

Syntek has shared the stage with artists such as Celia Cruz, Juanes, Gloria Estefan, Enrique Iglesias, Duran Duran, Shakira, Kylie Minogue, Miguel Bose, Juan Gabriel, Gianmarco, Noel Schajris, Armando Manzanero, Juan Luis Guerra, Plácido Domingo y La Orquesta Filarmónica de las Américas with Alondra de la Parra, Ana Torroja, Fey, Ruben Blades, Jesse y Joy, David Bisbal, Luis Fonsi, Laura Pausini, Amaia Montero. His work focuses not only on Pop and Rock, but he has also composed instrumental music for films and shorts with excellent commercial results, in 1999 he was awarded the Prize of the Mexican Academy of cinematography "Ariel" in the category "Best Original Composition for Movies" for Sexo, Pudor y Lágrimas. He has also worked for Disney Latino writing and singing his adaptation of the song composed by Randy Newman for Toy Story 3 which won the Oscar for "Best Original Composition For Movies". He performed the song "Ricas Frutas" to Sesame Street worldwide through the label "Putumayo". In 2005 he collaborated the song "Un héroe real" for the animated film Robots and is the Spanish voiceover for the main character "Rodney Copperbottom" and in Despicable Me for the character Vector aside Andrés Bustamante. Syntek composed the principal theme for "Cantinflas" the movie, released internationally in September 2014 and was distributed by Pantelion (Lionsgate and Televisa).

Syntek is the first and only Latino to run a disc digital release exclusively on iTunes originals.

=== Participation in The Voice ===
In the second half of 2011 Syntek participated pioneering The Voice in Mexico: La Voz alongside Lucero Hogaza León, Espinoza Paz and Alejandro Sanz. The broadcast broke records in the history of Mexican television. In their participation Syntek performed duets with fellow program and guest artists such as Laura Pausini, David Bisbal, Amaia Montero and the duo Jesse & Joy. The winner of his team, Oscar Garrido, reached 3rd place in the competition.

=== Today ===
Syntek was invited by Miguel Bosé to participate in his album Papitwo, presenting the theme "Duende"; as well as the singer Fey, who invited him to launch her album Primera Fila with the song "El cielo puede esperar" written by Syntek. In 2012, Syntek launched his single "La Tormenta", and shortly after he released his album Syntek + Syntek, which reintroduced Electronica and New Wave sounds, which had distinguished him at the beginning of his career. Meanwhile, the Spanish singer Malú invited him collaborate on her album, achieving Platinum Sales in Spain with the single "Sólo el amor nos salvará", which was authored by Syntek and interpreted by both during the broadcast La voz in Spain. Syntek also participated as a driver of the National Geographic show Sorprendentemente aired in Latin America.

In early 2014 he released the song "Corazones Invencibles", the first single of his latest album Romántico Desliz and part of the soundtrack of the Mexican telenovela of Televisa (2013) Lo Que La Vida Me Robó starring Angelique Boyer, Sebastian Rulli, Luis Roberto Guzman, and Daniela Castro. The song has held the number one place in charts for several weeks in the nations radio. Romántico Desliz was placed as number one album sells in iTunes.

=== Teletón USA ===
TeletónUSA, the U.S. fundraising arm of the Teletón Foundation and focused on serving children with neuromusculosketal disabilities through comprehensive rehabilitation, inaugurated the first Children's Rehabilitation Institute of TeletónUSA (CRIT USA) in San Antonio, Texas, on October 30, 2014. Various media figures and network executives, including the president and CEO of Univision Communications Inc, attended the event. Aleks Syntek and Luis Coronel sang the U.S. National Anthem and TeletónUSA Anthem respectively during the ceremony.

In an interview with Univision Syntek stated: "I am very happy to be honest, I like the cause, the children are my thing and I have always said that. We have to choose a cause, and as always I chose all causes that have to do with children on the street, with diseases, or children that are handicapped."

== Controversies ==
Throughout 2017 and 2018, Syntek became the subject of controversy due to his strong criticisms of reggaeton music. He has called it a "vulgar", "misogynist", "cheap" and "generic" genre which promotes "wrong values" in society,. On one occasion, he stated that listening to reggaeton could induce people to commit crimes. On several occasions, Syntek stated that his concern was not the rhythm of reggaeton but its lyrics, which he found unsuitable for minors.

During 2018, he was accused by a young British male who was at the time below the age of consent, better known as Lemon Brick, of sending suggestive and inappropriate messages through Instagram.

On September 15, 2026, Syntek gave a performance in the Benito Juárez borough of Mexico City , where he interrupted the show several times to confront the audience, referring to himself as a "god" and "master" of music before launching harsh accusations at the crowd. During the evening, mockingly imitating a Puerto Rican accent, he demanded of the attendees: "Speak like Mexicans, not like Puerto Ricans." Following the audience's rejection and displeasure, the singer-songwriter announced his departure from the country via social media, stating that "leaving means mental and spiritual salvation."

== Record labels ==
In July 2012, after working with EMI music for 22 years, he moved to Sony Music and released his first album internationally and in over 40 countries under the name of "Syntek + Syntek" and later in 2014 released the album Romantico Desliz.

== Discography ==
=== With La Gente Normal ===
Title	Album details
Hey Tú!	Released: 1990; Formats: CD; Label: EMI Music
Más Fuerte De Lo Que Pensaba (with Ray Manzarek)	Released: 1993; Formats: CD; Label: EMI Music
Bienvenido a la Vida	Released: 1995; Formats: CD; Label: EMI Music
Lugar Secreto	Released: 1997; Formats: CD; Label: EMI Music

=== Solo albums ===
Studio albums

Title	Album details	Certifications
De Noche en la Ciudad	Released: 2001; Formats: CD; Label: EMI Music	AMPROFON: Gold
Mundo Lite	Released: 2004; Formats: CD; Label: EMI Latin	AMPROFON: Platinum; RIAA: Platinum (Latin)
Lección de Vuelo	Released: 2007; Formats: CD, digital download; Label: EMI Latin	AMPROFON: Gold
Métodos de Placer Instantáneo (with Rubén Blades)	Released: 2010; Formats: CD, digital download; Label: EMI Latin	AMPROFON: Gold
Syntek	Released: 2012; Formats: CD, digital download; Label: EMI Latin	
Romántico desliz	Released: 2014; Formats: CD, digital download; Label: Columbia Records	
Trasatlántico	Released: 2017; Formats: CD, digital download; Label: Sony Music Mexico	
Anatomía del amor	Released: 2021; Formats: CD, digital download; Label: The Orchard Music	

Soundtrack albums

Title	Album details	Certifications
Sexo, Pudor Y Lágrimas	Released: 1999; Formats: CD; Label: EMI	AMPROFON: 2× Platinum

Live albums

- 89-99 (1999)
- Mundo Live (With Ana Torroja) (2005)
- Plug & Play (2008)
- Veinte Años en Vivo (2009)
- iTunes Originals (2010)

Compilations and EP

- Sexo, pudor y lágrimas (1999)
- 89-99 (2000)
- Múltiple (2003)
- 40 éxitos (2007)
- 20: 1989-2009 (2009)
- Celebrando la voz (2011)
- 3 décadas de duetos (2012)

== Collaborations ==
- "Microchips "Niños Eléctricos" (1988)
- "Microchips "De Película" (1989)
- "Sasha Sokol Trampas de Luz (1989)
- "Timbiriche 10 (1990)
- "Caló Lengua de Hoy (1990)
- "Rivera 3" - Fuera de Tu Alcance (1991)
- "Caló Ponte Atento (1992)
- "Queen en español – Tributo a Queen" (1997)
- "Tributo a José José" (1998)
- "Selena ¡Vive!" (2005)
- "Me Cuesta Tanto Olvidarte" – Ana Torroja (2006)
- "Porterhouse, Vol. 2" - Steve Porter (2007)
- "Homenaje a Pedro Infante" (2007)
- "Todos Somos Rigo Rigo Tovar" (2007)
- "Timbiriche 25 (2007)
- "Putumayo Kids Presents: Sesame Street Playground" (2008)
- "Álbum X" - Kylie Minogue "In My Arms" (2008)
- "Primera fila" – Fey "El Cielo Puede Esperar" (2012)
- "PapiTwo" – Miguel Bosé (2012)
- "Solo El Amor Nos Salvara" - Malú

== Filmography ==
Syntek has dubbed characters in animated films, including Rodney Copperbottom in Robots and Vector in Despicable Me.

=== Television ===
- La Voz... México (Primera Temporada; 2011)... Jurado y Coach.
- A Ciencia Cierta en el Canal 11 IPN
- Chiquilladas (1982-1983)... Varios Personajes
- Mis Huéspedes (1982)
- La Carabina de Ambrosio (1982)
- Rehilete
- Intro de "La familia P. Luche"
- La Señal – Jingle para XHGC, año 1990
