= Quiéreme tonto =

Mexican telenovela

- Created by: Cesar Sierra
- Developed by: TV Azteca
- Directed by: Jorge Rios Villanueva; Mario Marenco; Ignacio Perez
- Starring: Yahir; Litzy
- Theme music composer: Chacho Gaytan; Eduardo Soto
- Opening theme: "Ayer La Vi" performed by Angel y Khriz
- Country of origin: Mexico
- Original language: Spanish
- No. of episodes: 107

Production
- Executive producer: Pedro Luevano
- Producer: Igor Manrique
- Production location: Mexico City
- Editor: Mauricio Espejel
- Camera setup: Multi-camera
- Running time: 42 minutes

Original release
- Network: Azteca 13
- Release: April 19, 2010

Related
- Pobre diabla; Huérfanas

Quiéreme Tonto is a Mexican telenovela by TV Azteca, a remake of Bésame tonto, which has the same author. It premiered on April 19, 2010. This will be the third telenovela of the new era of Azteca Novelas. It stars Yahir and Litzy. It has some connection with TV Azteca and the ex-La Academia Giovanna, the winner of the seventh generation. It has the participation of Andrea Escalona as an antagonist and actors Dulce and Ariel López Padilla.

== Cast ==
=== Main cast ===
Actor	Character(s)	Descriptions
Yahir	Guillermo Romeo	Protagonist
Litzy	Julieta Dorelli	Protagonist

=== Prime actors ===
- Sergio Bustamante
- Sergio Kleiner as Dimas Romeo
- Dulce as Ximena Dorelli
- Ariel López Padilla as Lázaro Cruz

=== Secondary cast ===
- Andrea Escalona as Nallely
- Matías Novoa as Juan Diego Cruz
- Raúl Sandoval
- Giovannita (Cantante) as Clarita Romeo
- José Joel
- Cynthia
- Eugenio Montesoro
- Mayra Rojas como Engracia
- Nubia Martí as Asuncion
- Wendy Braga as Lolita
- Eva Prado as Engracia
- Carlos Torres como Gonzalo Romeo
- Kenia Gazcon
- Alberto Casanova como David Dorelli
- Irene Arcila
- Francisco Angelini as Miguel Dorelli
- Guillermo Iván as Antonio
- Alexandra Rodriguez as Diana
- Danny Gamba as Cory
- Laura Palma as Laura
- Cristobal Orellana as Ivan
- Agustin Arguello as Agustin
- Matias Aranda as Matias
- Manuel "Menny" Carrasco as Menny
- Oscar Jimenez as Oscar
- Sebastian Martingaste as Sebastian
