= Fey (singer) =

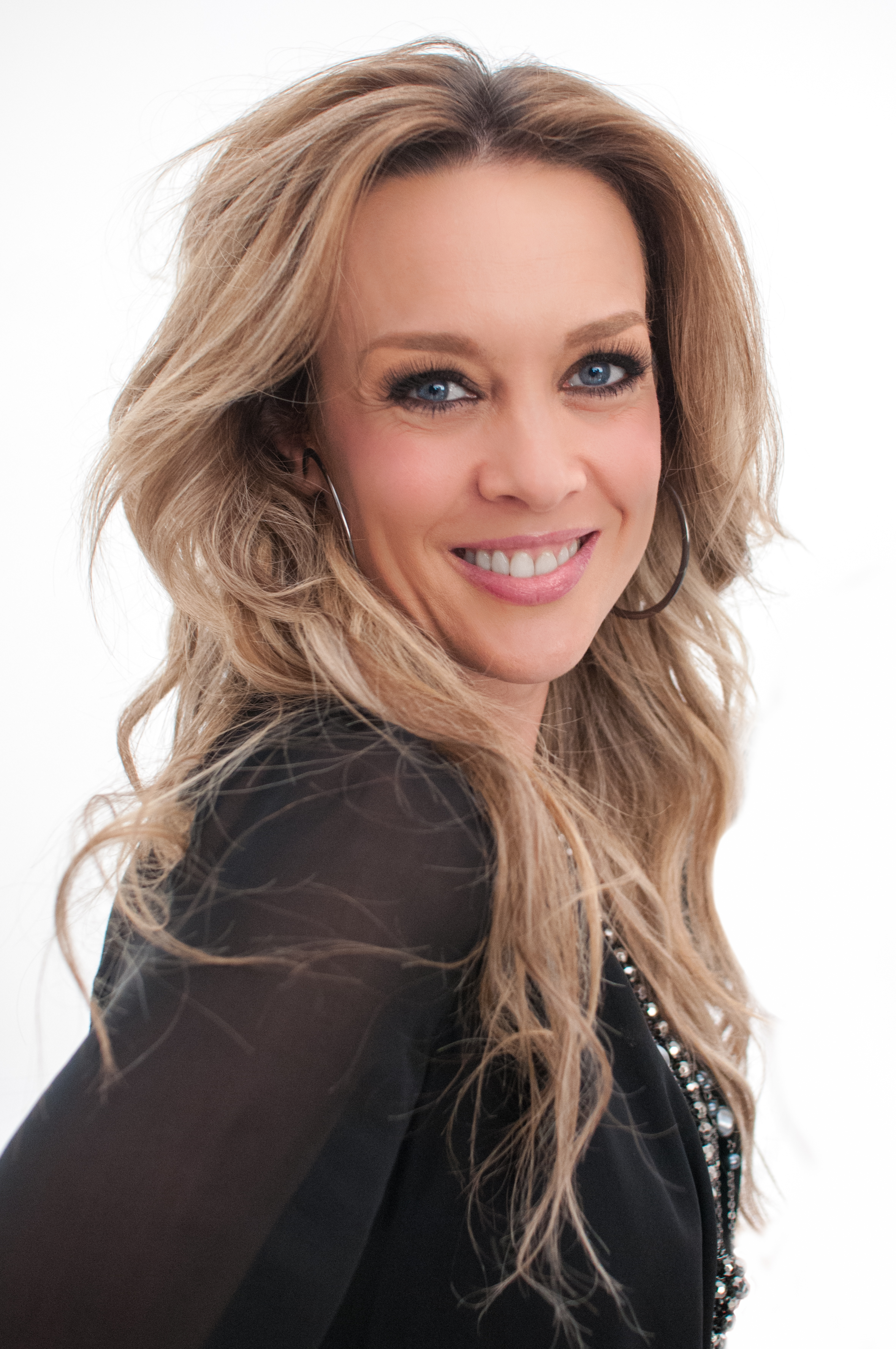
- Fey in 2013
- Born: María Fernanda Blázquez Gil; 21 July 1973 (age 53); Mexico City, Mexico
- Occupations: Singer; songwriter; model
- Years active: 1994–present
- Musical career
- Genres: Latin pop; dance-pop; electronic; electropop; eurodance
- Instruments: Vocals
- Labels: Sony Mexico; EMI Mexico; Mantequilla; Elephant; Bluper

María Fernanda Blázquez Gil (Note: Pronounced Spanish pronunciation: [maˈɾi.a feɾˈnanda ˈblaskes xil]) (born 21 July 1973), known professionally as Fey, (Note: Pronounced /feɪ/ FAY; Spanish pronunciation: [ˈfei]) is a Mexican singer and songwriter. She rose to prominence in the 1990s with her pop music, becoming a teen idol and fashion icon in Latin America.

Fey made her recording debut in 1995 with her self-titled album, which was certified platinum in Mexico. Her follow-up album, Tierna la Noche (1996), peaked at number 10 on the US Billboard Top Latin Albums chart. It was certified platinum in Mexico and earned her the Billboard Latin Music Award for Female Pop Album of the Year. Her third studio album, El Color de los Sueños (1998), was certified double gold in Mexico. Several of her singles, including "Ni tú ni nadie", "Subidón", "Las lágrimas de mi almohada", "Muévelo", and "Azúcar amargo", reached the top 20 on the Billboard Latin Pop Airplay chart.

In the 2000s, Fey released four studio albums: Vértigo (2002), La Fuerza del Destino (2004), Faltan Lunas (2006), and Dulce Tentación (2009). La Fuerza del Destino received a nomination for the Latin Grammy Award for Best Female Pop Vocal Album. With reported sales of more than 10 million records worldwide, Fey is one of the best-selling Latin music artists. She also became the first female solo artist to perform 10 times at the National Auditorium, drawing a combined audience of more than 95,000.

== Life and career ==
=== 1973-1994: Early life and career beginnings ===
María Fernanda Blásquez Gil was born on the July 21st 1973 in Mexico City, to Spanish bassist Fernando Blázquez and Argentinian singer Josefina Gil of the duo Las Gil. She has a younger brother named Francisco "Paco" Blázquez Gil.

The first time she sung on television was at 10 years of age, on the program XE-TU where she sang "No me puedes dejar así" with singer Luis Miguel.

Fey's parents' separated during her adolescence, after which she moved in with her aunt, Noemí Gil, due to being unable to accept her mother's new relationship. Unlike her parents, Noemí supported Fey's wishes to become a singer, even taking her to singing and dancing lessons without her parents' knowledge.

She later met Mauri Stern, of the group Magneto, with whom she began a romantic relationship. In mid-1994, after being rejected by several record labels, she signed a contract with Stern and Magneto's manager, Toño Berumen, to record her first album.

=== 1995–1999: Debut, Tierna la Noche and El Color de los Sueños ===
Fey released her first album, titled Fey, in 1995, through Sony Music (Mexico). Within a couple of months of the album's release, Fey had scored several hits in her native Mexico, and had reached No. 1 with "Media naranja", "Gatos en el balcon", "Me enamoro de ti" and "La noche se mueve". Fey toured Mexico, including consecutive concerts at the Teatro Metropolitan, and all of Latin America, and reached Gold record sales by the end of the year. In 1996 Fey released Tierna la Noche. "Azucar Amargo", the CD's first single, stayed in the Billboard chart for more than 30 weeks. Her tour, Tierna la noche, was also successful. Overall the tour consisted of more than 40 presentations in Mexico, the U.S. and Latin America, as well as some presentations in Europe. At the 9th Lo Nuestro Awards, Fey received a nomination for Pop New Artist.

In 1998, and after more than 8 months of absence, Fey released her third album El color de los sueños, which itself was different from the preceding two in that the album was a mix of different rhythms and styles. "Ni tu ni nadie", the album's first single, instantly reached number one in the Latin charts; "Diselo con flores", "Canela" and "Cielo Liquido" soon followed. Although the record did very well in sales, it did not compare to the over-the-top success of Tierna la noche. In the overall period of the three first albums, Fey's amazing popularity and promotion caused all but 4 of the singles released to hit No. 1 in Mexico, with the most important being "Azucar Amargo", "Media Naranja", "Ni tu Ni Nadie", "Muevelo" and "Te Pertenezco", all of them spending more than a month in the top position in Mexico. After almost a year of promotion, Fey announced, at a 1999 charity concert, that: "everything has a cycle, and this is the end of mine".

=== 2000–2002: Vértigo ===
Vértigo is the long awaited 4th album, which the singer prepared from 2000 to 2002, with several producers, including herself as such, in most of the songs. The album was released in CD and Cassette format, worldwide the album was released in Spanish with 11 and 12 tracks, depending on the country, in Mexico was released a deluxe edition that included a second CD with all the songs in English, plus 3 bonus tracks, included only in that album. The first single was titled "Se lo que vendrá / The Other Side", the song was a resounding success in Mexico, reaching the top of the charts, and the song in English was played on channels such as MTV, where it even made it to the top 100 most requested videos on MTV.

The promotion consisted of several performances on TV and at the EXA 02 festival, but the album was not promoted outside of Mexico and the United States, which caused the Latin American public to quickly forget the album. To finalize the promotion and after releasing some promotional songs like "Dime" and "Loca por amarte", the single "Noche Ideal / Dressing to kill" was released in CD format, without any kind of radio promotion, and was accompanied by a strictly limited edition with a slipcase with an alternative cover.

It was published in a double edition with one album in English and one in Spanish. The album at the time went gold for its sales, but it is estimated to have surpassed one million copies worldwide. The promotion of Vertigo ended abruptly in December 2002, cancelling the world tour.

=== 2004–2005: La Fuerza del Destino ===
In 2005, Fey, now a married woman, relaunched her career with La Fuerza del Destino, a tribute to the Spanish group Mecano. This album was successful; it contained three top-ten singles: "La Fuerza Del Destino", "Barco A Venus" and "Me Cuesta Tanto Olvidarte". A radio-only single, "Un Año Más", was released for the holiday season in Mexico.

Fey toured in support of this album at the Viña del Mar festival 2005, the Selena Vive! festival, and many local clubs across the United States and Latin America. The record excelled sales-wise, and it gave Fey her very first Latin Grammy nomination for "Best Pop Female Vocal Album". She also received 4 nominations for Premios Orgullosamente Latino 2005 & 2006-Ritmoson Latino and a Premio Oye nomination. She was recognized by the Gay & Lesbian Alliance Against Defamation (GLAAD) in Miami in 2006 for supporting gay human rights.

=== 2006–2007: Faltan Lunas ===
After the success of her fifth album, Fey released a sixth one, Faltan Lunas and was produced by Carlos Jean. It was slated for an 1 August 2006, release, but was released on 21 July, Fey's birthday. It features a pop/dance sound along with acoustic elements. The first single released was "Y Aquí Estoy". It was announced by Fey herself that the second single would be "Me Has Vuelto Loca", but it was changed to "Como Un Ángel". The album was only released in a few Latin American countries, and sold around 10,000 copies worldwide, making it her lowest selling album ever. "Como Un Ángel" was released in January 2007, but it failed to make an impact on the charts.

=== 2008–2011: Dulce Tentación and Sweet Temptation ===
Dulce Tentación was released 28 April 2009, and the English version called "Sweet Temptation" was set to be released over the next months. The album was produced by Sam 'FISH' Fisher, who also co-wrote more than half of the songs on the record and will be distributed internationally by Universal Music. One track, "Cicatrices" ["Monsters"] was available for download Fey's official site at the end of 2008. More than 170,000 downloads were registered while the track was available.

The first official single was "Lentamente" (Let Me Show You), a song that put Fey back in the top of the charts in México. The album was an unexpected success, winning a gold status for over 50.000 copies sold in less than one month in México. The second single Provócame (Games That you Play) was released in July 2009, however, a conflict between Fey and her new record label Mi Rey Music over promotion differences and the concept of the new video led Fey to part ways with the record label. Fey decided to create her own record label by buying the rights to her music and to Elephant Music from Mi Rey Music.

Late August 2009 Fey announced on her website that she was now in complete control of Elephant Music and continued to promote "Provócame", however, she suspended promotion of the single due to laryngitis. The video debuted on 21 September 2009; she also announced that she was to go on tour at the National Auditorium and record a live DVD. Fey toured clubs in the United States and Mexico.

The last single from the album was "Adicto A Mi Cuerpo". Initial plans for a music video were scrapped due to Fey deciding to move on and record a new album, making the single a radio-only release. However, it did chart on several online radio stations. "Sweet Temptation" was shelved as Fey decided to record a new album.

=== 2012–2014: Family, return to Sony Music, Primera Fila ===
During April 2010, it was announced via a press conference that Fey was in the studio recording her eighth studio album, with a lead single tentatively called "Te Amo A Mi Manera" previewed at the conference. The project went to hiatus because of her marriage to Alonso Orozco in September 2010. Fey gave birth to her first child, Isabella, in January 2011.

On 8 March 2012, it was confirmed via Sony Music Mexico that Fey would be returning to the record company, after almost ten years since the release of Vértigo, and three years after the release of Dulce Tentación/Sweet Temptation, her last studio album. She had announced that her eighth album would be a Primera Fila, an album composed entirely of live renditions of her past hits and a few new songs. It was recorded in June, and it was released in October 2012. The first single, "Frío", was released on July, 21st during Fey's 39th birthday celebration. The album was certified gold just three weeks after its release, marking it a success in Fey's career. She began her "Todo Lo Que Soy" (All That I Am) tour in February 2013 in Mexico's National Auditorium, where she had set a record years before for most sold-out performances by a female artist, to positive reviews. In March 2013, Premios Oye announced Fey as the official image and spokesperson for that year's ceremony, where she also performed. On 15 August 2013, Fey performed "Azucar Amargo" at Premios Texas where she also won the "Best Pop/Rock Artist" award. In January 2014, Fey announced her divorce from Orozco.

Fey confirmed in April 2014 that she will be a judge for the 2014 season of the dance competition show, "Bailando Por Un Sueño" (Dancing for a Dream). On 11 December 2014, Fey announced the release date of her Todo Lo Que Soy live CD & DVD package to be released on 17 December physically and 24 December digitally of the same year.

=== '90s Pop, Desnuda, Eternas Tours, New music and Hits Tour (2016 – onwards) ===
In February 2016, Fey officially released the single "No Me Acostumbro" alongside Cuban singer/actor Lenny de la Rosa, whom she had met as a judge on "Bailando Por Un Sueño" when he was a contestant. In the spring of 2016, Fey began promoting an upcoming tour called "Fey: 9.0 American Tour" which had a preview date in June 2016 in Mexico City's National Auditorium, home to Fey's own attendance record for a female recording artist. In September 2016, Fey released the digital single entitled "Amo", which was accompanied by a Fifty Shades of Grey inspired video.

In 2017, Fey joined the line-up of the '90s Pop Tour, joining artists Aleks Syntek, OV7, Erik Rubin, Beto Cuevas, JNS, and others. The tour had many dates during the spring and summer of 2017 across Mexico and the US. After this tour, Fey announced plans to start her own tour in wanting to record a live CD & DVD.

In 2018, Fey released two new singles, "Comiendote Tu Besos," and "No Te Necesito" along with the announcement of a new tour called "Desnuda Tour" (Nude Tour), an entirely different show from what the 9.0 American Tour was set to be. The tour began in October 2018 in Mexico with rave reviews its opening night as she performed songs from each of her previous albums.

On 25 September 2020, to celebrate the 25th anniversary of her career, Fey launched the English-language electronic single, "The Perfect Song" featuring Paul Oakenfold. In November 2020, Fey launched the recorded version of her "Desnuda Tour" via Cinepolis during a stream to raise funds for World Vision, a charity she is the ambassador for.

In February 2023, Fey announced that she and Alejandra Guzman will embark in a joint show called the "Eternas Tour" (Eternals Tour). The tour was cancelled shortly after its announcement due to management conflicts. In August 2023, Fey released a new single, "Veneno" with an accompanying music video and announced a tour would follow across the US and Mexico in the fall.

In December 2023, Fey announced her long-awaited tour of the United States supported Live Nation, with which she will be touring the country for much of 2024.

In January 2024, she released her song "Disparándole A La Nada", the song that supports the tour and debuted in the top # 5 of iTunes, and then in position # 4. With this song Fey began her promotional tour of the United States. She then announced a new show called "Hits Tour" set for Mexico in November 2024. She continued to release music in June 2024 with the single "Estoy Bailando Por Ti", a duet with Columbian singer Esteman. She continued the "Hits Tour" from 2025 to 2026 after its success in Mexico with dates across the USA, Argentia, Venezuela, and Chile. This led to the release of her "FEY HITS TOUR EN VIVO" live album in March 2026.

Fey is undertaking a brand new show called "Forever 17," debuting in August 2026 in Mexico's Auditorio Nacional. Fey has confirmed the show will include covers of songs that served as inspirations throughout her career.

== Tours ==
- Media Naranja Tour (1995)

Date	City	Country	Venue
February 7	Mexico City	Mexico	Teatro Metropólitan

- Tierna La Noche Tour (1997)

Date	City	Country	Venue
February 7	Mexico City	Mexico	Auditorio Nacional
February 8	Mexico City	Mexico	Auditorio Nacional
February 9	Mexico City	Mexico	Auditorio Nacional
February 14	Monterrey	Mexico	Parque Fundidora
February 16	Mexico City	Mexico	Auditorio Nacional
February 22	Tijuana	Mexico	Toreo de Tijuana
March 1	Guatemala City	Guatemala	Grand Tikal Futura Hotel
April 16	Chihuahua	Mexico	Gimnasio Manuel Bernardo Aguirre
April 19	Mexico City	Mexico	Auditorio Nacional
April 26	Mexico City	Mexico	Auditorio Nacional
April 27	Mexico City	Mexico	Auditorio Nacional
April 28	Mexico City	Mexico	Auditorio Nacional
April 30	Mexico City	Mexico	Auditorio Nacional
May 16	Acapulco	Mexico	Festival Acapulco
May 17	Cuernavaca	Mexico	Auditorio Teopanzolco
July 23	Caracas	Venezuela	Poliedro de Caracas
July 24	Maracaibo	Venezuela	Hotel del Lago
July 27	Arequipa	Peru	Jardín de la Cerveza
July 28	Lima	Peru	Centro de Convenciones Maria Angola
September 5	Buenos Aires	Argentina	Teatro Gran Rex
October 7	Mexico City	Mexico	Auditorio Nacional

- FEY USA Tour (2024)

Date	City	Country	Venue
March 2	Austin	United States	Circuit of the Americas (Bésame Mucho)
March 16	McAllen	United States	McAllen Performing Arts Center
March 17	San Antonio	United States	The Aztec Center
March 21	Dallas	United States	House of Blues
March 23	Houston	United States	House of Blues
March 30	Phoenix	United States	The Van Buren
March 31	Las Vegas	United States	House of Blues
August 1	San Diego	United States	The Magnolia
August 3	San Jose	United States	San Jose Civic
September 13	Los Angeles	United States	The Wiltern

- HITS Tour (2024-2025)

2024
Date	City	Country	Venue
November 8	Mexico City	Mexico	Auditorio Nacional
November 15	Merida	Mexico	Palenque de la Feria
2025
Date	City	Country	Venue
January 17	Toluca	Mexico	Teatro Morelos
February 28	Tijuana	Mexico	El Foro
March 21	Mexico City	Mexico	Auditorio Nacional
March 28	Monterrey	Mexico	Arena Monterrey
March 29	Querétaro	Mexico	Auditorio Josefa Ortiz
April 26	Guadalajara	Mexico	Arena Guadalajara
May 25	Mexico City	Mexico	Auditorio Nacional (Con Todo Amor 2025)
June 5	Los Angeles	United States	The Wiltern
June 6	San Diego	United States	The Magnolia
June 7	San Jose	United States	San Jose Civic
June 14	Madrid	Spain	IFEMA (Love The 90s)
June 20	Mexico City	Mexico	Auditorio Nacional (Dancing Queens 2025)
June 21	Mexico City	Mexico	Auditorio Nacional (Dancing Queens 2025)
October 2	Mexico City	Mexico	Auditorio Nacional
October 25	Guadalajara	Mexico	Arena Guadalajara

== Discography ==
=== Studio albums ===
- Fey (1995)
- Tierna la Noche (1996)
- El Color de los Sueños (1998)
- Vértigo (2002)
- La Fuerza Del Destino (2004)
- Faltan Lunas (2006)
- Dulce Tentación (2009)
- Fey: Primera Fila (2012)
- Todo lo Que Soy – En Vivo (2014)
- FEY HITS TOUR EN VIVO (2026)
- Libre (TBA)

== Awards and nominations ==
Name of the award ceremony, year presented, nominee(s) of the award, award category, and the result of the nomination
Award ceremony	Year	Category	Nominee(s)/work(s)	Result	Ref.
Billboard Latin Music Awards	1998	Pop Album of the Year, Female	Tierna la Noche	Won	
Billboard Latin Music Awards	1999	Pop Album of the Year, Female	El Color de los Sueños	Nominated	
El Heraldo de México Awards	1996	Breakthrough Solo Singer	Fey	Nominated	
GLAAD Media Award	2006	Valentía Award	Fey	Won	
Latin Grammy Awards	2005	Best Female Pop Vocal Album	La Fuerza del Destino	Nominated	
Lo Nuestro Awards	1997	New Pop Artist of the Year	Fey	Nominated	
Lo Nuestro Awards	1999	Pop Female Artist of the Year	Fey	Nominated	
TVyNovelas Awards	1996	Breakthrough Female Singer	Fey	Won	

== See also ==
- List of best-selling Latin music artists
