= Litzy =

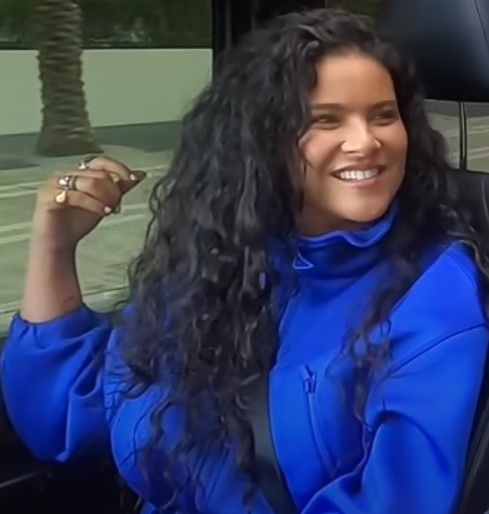

Background information
- Born: Litzy Vanya Domínguez Balderas; October 27, 1982 (age 43); Mexico City
- Origin: Mexico City
- Occupations: Actress and singer
- Instrument: Vocals
- Years active: 1995–present

Litzy Vanya Domínguez Balderas (born October 27, 1982), known by her stage name Litzy, is a Mexican singer and actress.

== Career ==
Litzy is known for having been in the Mexican singing group Jeans, and for her (formerly "always" protagonist) roles in Telenovelas: Televisa's DKDA Sueños de Juventud; Telemundo's Daniela, Amarte así, (Frijolito), and Una Maid en Manhattan; Venevisión-with-Univisión's Pecadora; and Azteca [Mexico] TV's Quiéreme Tonto, retitled simply Quiéreme. Probably her most successful recent song is "La Rosa." She sang the entrada song (opening theme song) for both Daniela ("Sobreviveré") and Amarte Asi ("Amarte Asi"). For Una Maid en Manhattan, she sings the entrada as a duet with Siller. She also has recorded a theme song entitled "Pecadora" for Pecadora. However, as recently aired, the telenovela is not using that song for its entrada, but (in part) as the closing theme. Amarte Asi has also been aired with a different title, Frijolito. It is also notable that Litzy won a sort of acting-contest reality show run by Telemundo entitled Protagonistas de la Fama. Apparently her winning of that contest landed her the starring role in Amarte Así. She also was the star of Daniela, and went on to star in Pecadora, Quiéreme Tonto (2010), and Una Maid en Manhattan (2012), a spin-off and expansion of the Jennifer Lopez movie, Maid in Manhattan).

Litzy definitively broke out of her Cinderella typecasting in 2014 by playing a prostitute in Telemundo's Señora Acero.

Documentation for Litzy and her telenovelas has been posted at the Amarte-Asi forum of Telenovela-World.com.

After making Amarte Así, Litzy studied acting in Los Angeles for the better part of a year, evidently with the desire to act in Hollywood, a desire not fulfilled. After acting school but before obtaining her role in Pecadora, she was credited with roles in three obscure Mexican movie titles: "Vestidos y Otras Anécdotas," a short movie entitled "Subversión Total" (2007), and "Borderline" (2009).

She recently played a lesbian character in the comedy, Manual Para Galanes, directed by Alfredo Hueck.

== Filmography ==
=== Films ===
Year	Title	Role	Notes
2007	Subversión total		Short film
2009	Borderline	Ceci	
2023	The Weapon		

=== Television ===
Year	Title	Role	Notes
1999–2000	DKDA: Sueños de juventud	Laura Martínez	Recurring role
2001	Carita de ángel	Herself	Final episode
2002	Daniela	Daniela Gamboa	Lead role
2005	Amarte así, Frijolito	Margarita Lizárraga	Lead role
2009–2010	Pecadora	Luz María Mendoza	Lead role
2010	Quiéreme tonto	Julieta Dorelli	Lead role
2011–2012	Una Maid en Manhattan	Marisa Luján	Lead role
2014–2016	Señora Acero	Aracely Paniagua	Supporting role (225 episodes)
2017	Milagros de Navidad	Mónica	Episode: "El milagro del niño Diego"
2018	Al otro lado del muro	Eliza Romero	
2021	Who Killed Sara?	Marifer	Recurring role
2022	¿Quién es la máscara?	Alfiletero	Season 4
2023	Pacto de silencio	Sofía Estrada	Lead role
2024	Mujeres asesinas	Hortensia	Episode: "Hortensia"
2024	La mujer de mi vida	Carmen Alonso	
TBA	Cautiva por amor	Jazmín Palacios	Lead role

== Accolades ==
Year	Premio	Category	Telenovela	Result
2000	Premios TVyNovelas	Best Debutante of the Year	DKDA, Dreams of Magic and Youth	Nominated
2012	Your World Awards	Favorite Lead Actress	Maid in Manhattan	Nominated
2012	Your World Awards	The Perfect Couple With Eugenio Siller	Maid in Manhattan	Nominated
2012	Your World Awards	Favorite Novela Soundtrack – Amor Sin Final	Maid in Manhattan	Nominated
2012	Your World Awards	Best Supporting Actress of Súper Series	Señora Acero	Nominated
2012	Your World Awards	The Perfect Couple With Rodrigo Guirao	Señora Acero	Nominated
2012	People en Español	Best Female Actress	Maid in Manhattan	Nominated
2012	People en Español	The Perfect Couple With Eugenio Siller	Maid in Manhattan	Nominated

=== Web ===
Year	Title	Role	Notes
2014	Secreteando	Herself	"Hace tiempo que debí contártelo" (Season 2, Episode 1)
