= Esteman =

Colombian singer and songwriter (born 1984)

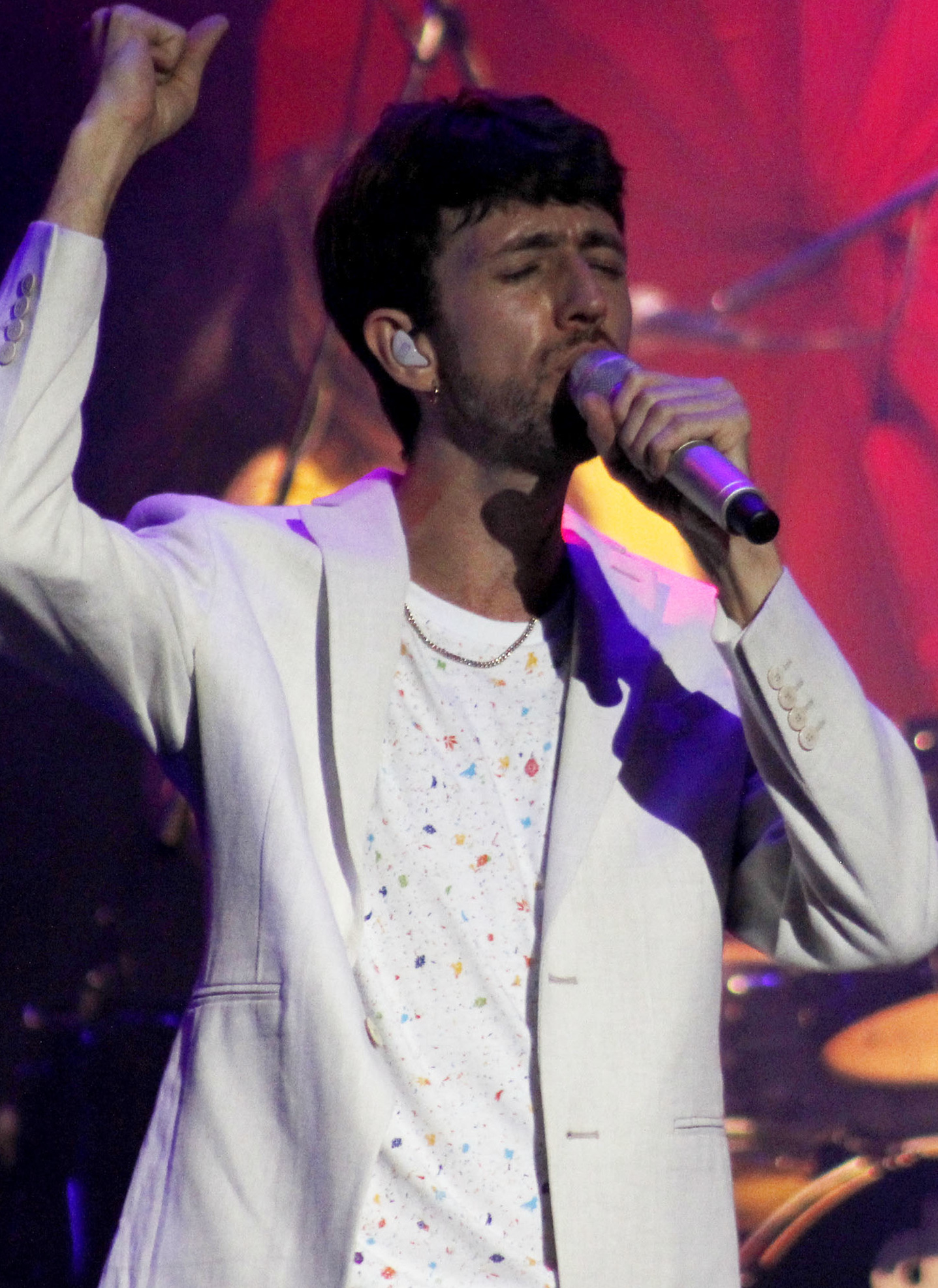
- Esteman in 2019

Background information
- Also known as: Esteban Mateus Williamson
- Born: May 4, 1984 (age 42)
- Origin: Bogotá, Colombia
- Genres: Rock en español, Latin pop, Alternative pop
- Years active: 2009–present
- Label: Universal Music Mexico
- Website: www.esteman.com

Esteban Mateus Williamson (born May 4, 1984), known professionally as Esteman, is a Colombian singer and songwriter from Bogotá, Colombia.

== Music career ==
Esteman first rose to popularity with his music video "No te metas a mi facebook" ("Stay Off My Facebook"), which went viral on YouTube, garnering nearly 2.6 million views. His debut album, 1er Acto, was released on April 28, 2012. It featured a collaboration with Colombian singer/songwriter Andrea Echeverri in "Aquí Estoy Yo" and also featured Monsieur Periné and Juan Pablo Vega (es). His second full album Caótica Belleza was released on August 28, 2015 and features Natalia LaFourcade, Li Saumet (lead singer of Bomba Estéreo), Carla Morrison, and Juan Jose Quiñónez.

In 2016, Esteman was one of the artists scheduled to feature in the first Lollapalooza Colombia music festival before it was cancelled due to concerns caused by the Zika outbreak. At the 2016 Latin Grammy Awards, Esteman was nominated for the category of Best New Artist, but lost to Colombian singer Manuel Medrano. His album Caótica Belleza was one of five albums nominated for the category Best Alternative Music Album, but lost to L.H.O.N by Illya Kuryaki and the Valderramas.

Esteman calls his band "La Esteband" and has toured with it in Colombia, Argentina, Peru, Chile, Mexico, and the United States. His third album, Amor libre, was released in early 2019. Esteman, who is openly gay, described the album as a more personal and honest endeavor, opening himself up to his audience in an attempt to normalize and naturalize his sexual orientation so that people no longer view it as taboo. He released his fourth album, Si volviera a nacer, in May 2021. The album featured appearances from Miranda!, Rozalén, and Lila Downs.

== Style and genre ==
Esteman studied art at Universidad de los Andes, which has influenced his music videos and performances, known for their strong theatrical aspect. His videos include choreography and often depict Esteman wearing vintage clothing, with skinny pants and colorful shirts. He began his singing career by mocking pop idols and, as he puts it "breaking the macho stereotype" and this is evident in the critically humorous and sarcastic nature of songs like "No te metas a mi Facebook". His style has always been a mixture of genres, and his album Caótica Belleza includes traditional, reggae, and 80s disco tones. His stage performances have been noted for their theatrics, with radio network Los 40 calling him "from another world".

Esteman also says that he is a feminist, and that the alternative take on popular music to which he and the artists he has worked with subscribe is important to the Colombian music scene, which has for a long time been dominated by reggaetón.

== Discography ==
- 1er Acto (2012)
- Caótica Belleza (2015)
- Amor Libre (2019)
- Si Volviera a Nacer (2021)
