= Primera Fila (Fey album) =

Fey: Primera Fila

Live album by Fey
- Released: October 23, 2012
- Recorded: 1996–2012
- Genre: Power pop, synthpop, pop, acoustic
- Label: Columbia, Sony Latin
- Producer: Armando Avila

Fey chronology
Dulce Tentación (2009)	Fey: Primera Fila (2012)	Todo Lo Que Soy-En Vivo (2014)

Singles from Fey: Primera Fila
- 1. "Frío" Released: July 21, 2012; 2. "Te Pertenezco" Released: October 9, 2012; 3. "Me Haces Tanta Falta" Released: January 22, 2013; 4. "Azúcar Amargo" Released: April 9, 2013

Fey: Primera Fila is the acoustic album by Mexican pop singer Fey. The live album, part of Sony's "Primera Fila" series, was shot and recorded in Mexico on June 22, 2012 in front of fans and special guests on an invite-only basis. The live album has new renditions of songs from her first three albums, as well as three new tracks. The album features a documentary of the process as well as a live video recording of the concert.

== Track listing ==
1. Muévelo
2. Te Pertenezco
3. Frío
4. Gatos en el Balcón
5. Desmargaritando el Corazón
6. Ni tú ni nadie
7. Me Haces Tanta Falta
8. El Cielo Puede Esperar (featuring Aleks Syntek)
9. Subidón
10. Me Enamoro de Ti
11. Azúcar Amargo
12. La Noche Se Mueve
13. Media Naranja

== Charts ==
Chart (2012–2013)	Peak position
Mexican Album Chart	2
U.S. Billboard Top Latin Albums	73
Year-end chart (2012–2013)	Peak position
Mexican Top 100 Anual Albums 2012	54
Mexican Top 100 Anual Albums 2013	80

== Certifications and sales ==
Region	Certification	Certified units/sales
Mexico (AMPROFON)	Gold	30,000^{^}
^{^} Shipments figures based on certification alone.

== Promotion & Tour ==
Fey has promoted the album by performing most of the tracks live in some of Mexico's most popular television shows. The day of the album's release, it was announced Fey would begin her world tour named "Todo Lo Que Soy," starting in Mexico City's National Auditorium, where Fey had set the record for the most sold out performances by a female artist. Her first show for the tour was on February 22, 2013 and future tour date announcements followed for about a year. Fey has stated that she will perform songs from all of her career-making albums.

Date	City, State	Venue	Attendance
February 22, 2013	Mexico City	National Auditorium	9.187 / 9.187 (100%)
March 16, 2013	Acapulco City	Forum Mundo Imperial	
April 19, 2013	Monterrey	Banamex Auditorium	3,877 / 4,575 (85%)
April 21, 2013	Mexico City	National Auditorium	8,888 / 9,564 (93%)
April 27, 2013	Guadalajara	Telmex Auditorium	
June 1, 2013	Puebla	CCU Auditorium	
June 8, 2013	Queretaro	Dominguez Auditorium	
July 20, 2013	Veracruz	Malecon Macroplaza	
August 17, 2013	Zacatlan	Town Theater	
September 21, 2013	Zacatecas	Town Theater	
October 16, 2013	Guadalajara	Juarez Auditorium	
November 9, 2013	Merida	Xmatkuil Fair	
February 27, 2014	Veracruz	Juarez Auditorium	
March 20, 2014	Villahermosa	Town Theater	
May 14, 2014	Michoacan	Michoacan Expo Fair	
August 7, 2014	Durango	Durango National Fair	
October 11, 2014	Tijuana	El Foro	

Setlist

1. Frio
2. Te Pertenezco
3. Barco a Venus
4. Diselo Con Flores
5. Gatos En El Balcon
6. Desmargaritando El Corazon
7. Me Haces Tanta Falta
8. Canela
9. Subidon
10. Ni Tu Ni Nadie
11. Me Enamoro De Ti
12. Tierna La Noche
13. El Cielo Puede Esperar (only February 22, 2013) with Aleks Syntek
14. Cielo Liquido
15. Lentamente
16. Se Lo Que Vendra
17. Dressing to Kill
18. Azucar Amargo
19. Muevelo
20. Media Naranja
21. La Noche Se Mueve
