= Fey (album) =

Studio album by Fey
- Released: 27 June 1995
- Recorded: 1994
- Genre: Dance-pop
- Label: Sony Mexico

Fey chronology
Fey (1995)	Tierna La Noche (1996)

Fey is the debut studio album by Mexican singer Fey, released on 27 June 1995, through Sony Music Entertainment Mexico, it has sold over 2 million worldwide.

== Background and recording ==
Initially, Fey began as a backup singer of the group Las Hermanas Gil, which was made up by two of her aunts, a very famous duo during their time. Fey's family did not agree with her wishing to attend dance and singing classes, as they felt she was too young. For this reason, her aunts decided to include her in the group in some way. Meanwhile, Fey was recording demos for different labels until around 1989 PolyGram was interested in the Fey's concept, she was then 16 years old. Finally, PolyGram did not admit Fey into their label. Fey and her aunt Nohemi Gil were knocking on doors, until in 1994, until there was an opportunity with Sony Music, thanks to Toño Berumen, who showed interest in Fey. She signed the contract with Sony and Fey traveled to Spain to recorded her first album. She worked with Jose Ramon Florez, who composed many of the tracks.

== Promotion and success ==
Professional ratings
Review scores
Source	Rating
AllMusic	2.85 stars on a 5 point scale
todocoleccion	5/5 stars
Coveralia Música	10/10 stars

Again in Mexico, Fey presented her homonymous disc in the program Siempre en Domingo (Always in Sunday). Overnight, Fey got fame and recognition she sought after thanks to her single Media naranja. That single ranked as number one on radio lists all across Mexico, lasting more than 40 weeks in the top 10 positions, in addition it launched Fey's fame to different countries from Latin America, obtaining the number one spot in Argentina, Chile, Bolivia, Venezuela and Peru; all countries where it created a major impact.

The managers of Fey created a controversy with respect to her age, they decided to put that she was 17 years to her when in fact she was 21. The situation that was not denied at the time nor by her managers and by the singer. Also, she had to hide her relationship with her then one to manager and singer in the group Magneto, Mauri Stern, who already had several years of romance with Fey prior to her album's launch. Both decided to maintain their relationship a secret until several years later.

After the promotion of Media naranja, Fey received a golden disc in her native country by high sales and promoted Gatos en el balcón, with the same effect that her previous single. That year, the singer get a nomination at the ERES Awards, with Best Video Clip for the year. Gatos en el balcón was filmed out in France with blue effects, that managed to lift the quality of the video, leading her to win that nomination including best image and best pitch. She also signed a contract with the brand Fanta to which recorded commercial with the slogan Sabor de alto voltaje (Flavor of high voltage) as their spokeswoman.

When Fey launch the single Me enamoro de ti, the promotion of the album was finalized and managed to maintain the Fey's fame in Latin America. In addition, a platinum record was awarded to Fey, for high sales of almost two million albums worldwide.

== Presentations and tour ==
Fanta supported the Fey's tour by different stores, but it was canceled because the public jammed these enclosures, exposing so much to the spectators as to the singer. Soon Fey started her tour at the end of 1995 in her country, appearing in the Metropólitan Theater, with four dates consecutives and total plenty.

Finally, the singer traveled to different countries from South America where she made diverse presentations. One was her presentation in the Viña del mar Festival in 1996, where she won a Silver torch.

== Impact and legacy ==
Since those years existed drained musical recognized by several musical critics in Mexico, Fey has been considered as the first true Latin pop star of 1990 decade, even before Shakira, Anahí or Lynda, that their respective careers musical began. The sound of the album is a combination of industrial with fusions of pop Latin and dance, putting a new paramount in Latin American pop.

For the end of the 2008, the channel VH1 Latin America transmitted the program The 100 huge songs of 90s in Spanish where they occurred to know 100 the songs that, according to the program, marked to music in Spanish in decade of the 90's. In the first program it was had as panelist to Fey, that appeared in position 91 with her song Media naranja.

In late 2009, the album was featured on the MVS documentary series Discografias: 25 Discos Essentiales, as one of the twenty five essential recordings of Latin American music. The album was said to have had "a definitive impact on the 90s generation" and to have "changed the way Pop was made in Mexico".

== Track listing ==
In the first edition were 12 songs, and the second edition includes 2 remixes.

No.	Title	Writer(s)	Length
1.	"Bombón"	Felisatti / Florez	4:15
2.	"Gatos en el balcón"	Florez / Marugan	4:08
3.	"Fiebre del sábado"	Felisatti / Florez	3:21
4.	"La soledad me matará"	Felisatti / Florez	4:05
5.	"Media naranja"	Florez / Marugan	3:44
6.	"Me enamoro de ti"	Florez / Marugan	3:55
7.	"Dos corazones"	Felisatti	4:06
8.	"Tirando a matar"	Felisatti / Florez	3:35
9.	"Bailando bajo la lluvia"	Florez	3:16
10.	"La noche se mueve"	Florez	4:25
11.	"Como pan y chocolate"	Florez / Marugan	4:03
12.	"La noche se mueve (remix)"	Florez	4:19

Second edition bonus tracks

No.	Title	Writer(s)	Productor	Length
13.	"Media naranja (trance)"	Florez / Marugan	Sam "Fish" Fisher	6:04
14.	"Me enamoro de ti (remix)"	Florez / Marugan	Sam "Fish" Fisher	4:04

== Singles ==
Single information
"Media Naranja"
- Released: March 22, 1995
- Chart positions: #1 Mexico, #1 Peru
"Me Enamoro de Ti"
- Released: 1995
- Chart positions: #1 Mexico, #2 Peru
"Gatos en el Balcón"
- Released: 1995
- Chart positions: #1 Mexico, #9 Peru

Single information
"La Noche se Mueve"
- Released: 1996
- Chart positions: #1 Mexico
"Fiebre De Sabado"
- Released: 1996
- Chart positions: #2 Mexico
"Bailando Bajo La Lluvia"
- Released: 1996
- Chart positions: #1 Mexico

== Charts and certifications ==
=== Charts ===
Chart (1995)	Peak position
Mexican Album Chart	1
Argentina	8
Chile	10
Colombia	1
Spain	39

=== Sales and certification ===
Region	Certification	Certified units/sales
Mexico (AMPROFON)	Platinum	250,000^{^}
^{^} Shipments figures based on certification alone.
