= Faltan Lunas =

Studio album by Fey
- Released: July 21, 2006 (Mexico); August 1, 2006 (United States)
- Recorded: 2006
- Genre: Electropop
- Length: 47:55
- Label: EMI
- Producer: Carlos Jean

Fey chronology
La Fuerza Del Destino (2004)	Faltan Lunas (2006)	Dulce Tentación (2009)

Singles from Faltan Lunas
- 1. "Y Aquí Estoy" Released: June 2006; 2. "Como Un Ángel" Released: January 2007

Faltan Lunas (Moons are Missing) is Fey's sixth studio album, released in July 2006. The first single to be taken from the album was "Y Aquí Estoy". Faltan Lunas was well received by the Latin public and critics, and, when released, became "Album of the Week" at Mixup, the most important music store in Mexico, for its high sales. Fey said in an interview that there were to be two additional tracks on the album or 13. Those two additional tracks were supposed to be English versions of two other songs on the album, but these were never released.

== Controversy ==
This album stirred up a lot of controversy, especially among longtime Fey fans, because the label and Fey's management team were accused of doing too little to promote their artist. This became evident when the album performed poorly. After almost 6 months from the official release of the album, no second single had been released, and it had only 2 international releases, being the United States of America and Colombia, the only countries besides Mexico where the album was officially released.

Due to the failure of the album, Fey seemed to disappear, making no appearances in promotional events, concerts or television shows. This gave rise to rumors of a possible second retirement. In early April, however, she stated that she had "made drastic changes" in terms of her management and record label.

The album's release went unnoticed by radio stations, which gave no airplay to Fey's new songs. Y Aquí Estoy reached the top 10 thanks in part to digital sales and #1 in Colombia, thanks to which the album was released in the Latin American country. The second single, from 2007, "Como un ángel", did not reach the charts and was only released in the United States and Puerto Rico on the radio, and in Mexico a physical edition of the single was released, and it was marketed digitally through the Mixup site.

The promotion of the album was reduced to several TV performances in Mexico and the United States, during 2006, where she repeatedly performed her lukewarm hit "y aquí estoy" as well as the songs "Me has vuelto loca" (which was intended to be the second single) and "como un ángel", in addition to the hits from her previous album "La fuerza del destino", such as "Barco a venus". EMI released several promotional CDs in the USA for Latin radio stations with the songs "Me has vuelto loca", "Entre dos" and "Faltan lunas", which were not released as official singles.

At the end of 2006, fey, was included in the Christmas album "Navidad con amigos" and filmed the video for the song "Un año más" included in her previous album, fey's look in the video clip is totally from the "Faltan lunas" era including the characteristic tiara.

The album was a production directed and produced by Carlos Jean, and was based on adaptations to the Spanish language, of songs by European artists, little recognized outside the territory, giving them new life in the voice of fey, the songs gained relevance thanks to this turn to the Spanish language. As a curiosity, the original versions of the songs "Faltan lunas" and "Volar otra vez" were written by Graeme Pleeth, who worked on Fey's 2002 album "Vértigo".

The album is considered to have sold almost 100,000 copies, data from around 2007 (Fey's least successful album), But it was relaunched in 2011 and in 2023, in Mexico, so it is estimated that its physical sales could be 4 times higher than the sales reported in 2007.

After this resounding performance, Fey decided to cut work ties with Capitol records and EMI Music, but as she had three albums under contract, it was decided to make a compilation album, which was released in mid 2007, which was titled "Best Of Fey" an album that included two songs never before included in a Fey album; "Todo cambió" composed by Jannette Chao and another edition the duet song with Aleks Syntek "Dónde quiera que estes", recorded for the album "Selena Vive" in 2005. With this album, fey settled her contract with EMI, leaving the label and disappearing from the music scene for a few months.

== Track listing ==
The album contents 11 songs in Spanish. This is the official track listing:

Track	Title	Writer(s)	Producer(s)	Time
1.	"Y Aquí Estoy"	(De Giorgio/Lundberg), Spanish Version: Ángela D./S. Rivas	Carlos Jean	4:13
2.	"Me Has Vuelto Loca"	(Ray Cobtreras/Jimmy Greco/Claudia Brant)	Carlos Jean	3:27
3.	"Como Un Ángel"	(Staffan Hellstrand), Spanish Version: María Fernanda Blázquez Gil(Fey)	Carlos Jean	4:26
4.	"Faltan Lunas"	(Graeme Pleeth & Shelly Poole), Spanish Version: María Fernanda Blázquez Gil(Fey)/Nacho Larrañaga	Carlos Jean	3:47
5.	"Tres Razones"	(Valeria Rossi/Francisco Cabras/Liliana Ritten)	Carlos Jean	4:22
6.	"La Última Gota"	Carola Rosas/Armando Ávila	Carlos Jean	3:47
7.	"Solo Por Bailar"	(Jade Ell/Niklas Bergwall/Niklas Kings/Sylwia Chaliss), Spanish Version: Ángela D./J.L Querubín	Carlos Jean	3:15
8.	"Entre Dos"	(Anders), Spanish Version: Ángela D./J.L Querubín	Carlos Jean	3:36
9.	"Yo Decido"	(Wollbeck/Lindblom/Andy Love), Spanish Version: Ángela D./J.L Querubín	Carlos Jean	3:36
10.	"Volar Otra Vez"	(Graeme Pleeth & Shelly Poole), Spanish Version: Ángela D./J.L Querubín	Carlos Jean	3:59
11.	"Si Tengo Miedo"	Manu	Carlos Jean	3:29
