= Vértigo (Fey album) =

Vertigo

Studio album by Fey
- Released: May 21, 2002
- Recorded: 2000–2002; Madrid, London, Miami, New York City, Washington D.C.
- Genres: Dance; electronica
- Length: 55:37
- Languages: English; Spanish
- Labels: Epic; Sony Mexico
- Producers: Fey (also exec.); Graeme Pleeth; Robin Barter; Robert Jazayeri

Fey chronology
El Color de los Sueños (1998)	Vertigo (2002)	La Fuerza Del Destino (2004)

Singles from Vertigo
- 1. "The Other Side / Sé Lo Que Vendrá" Released: April 15, 2002; 2. "Dressing to Kill / Noche Ideal" Released: October 17, 2002

Vértigo is the fourth studio album by Mexican singer Fey. It was released on May 21, 2002, by Epic Records and Sony Music Mexico. The album instantly succeeded in Latin America, topping the charts. The album took 2 years to complete. Musically, it incorporates elements of europop, electronica and alternative pop. It debuted at number one in Fey's native Mexico, topping the album charts and opening with an impressive 75,000 copies. Vertigo was the last album Fey released with Sony Music until 2012, when she signed a new record deal with the label.

== Background and production ==
Originally released in Mexico as a double album featuring one disc in English and a second in Spanish, Vertigo became the fourth full-length record by Latin pop artist Fey. It was produced in England and the U.S. by Graeme Pleeth and Robert Jazayeri. Anticipated following the release of the Sé Lo Que Vendrá single, Vertigo achieved gold status in Mexico after selling 75,000 copies in two weeks.

=== Singles ===
The album spawned two official singles released over a period of 7 months. The first, "The Other Side", was released in April 2002 to critical acclaim and a successful run on many Latin charts. It is deemed Fey's comeback single, peaking in the top ten countries like Argentina, Mexico, and Colombia. The song "Dressing To Kill" was released in late autumn as the 2nd single. "Romeo & Juliet" was released instead on February 7, 2003, as a promo single in Colombia.

== Track listing ==
Disc One
No.	Title	Writer(s)	Producer(s)	Length
1.	"Dime"	Fey, Graeme Pleeth, Robin Barter	Graeme Pleeth, Robin Barter	3:24
2.	"Sé Lo Que Vendrá"	Fey, Graeme Pleeth, Robin Barter	Graeme Pleeth, Robin Barter	4:27
3.	"Vértigo"	Fey, Graeme Pleeth, Robin Barter	Graeme Pleeth, Robin Barter	5:21
4.	"Noche Ideal"	Fey, Graeme Pleeth, Robin Barter	Graeme Pleeth, Robin Barter	3:57
5.	"Romeo & Juliet"	Fey, Robert Jazayeri	Robert Jazayeri	4:24
6.	"Loca Por Amarte"	Fey, Graeme Pleeth, Robin Barter	Graeme Pleeth, Robin Barter	4:34
7.	"Vienen y Van"	Fey, Graeme Pleeth, Robin Barter	Graeme Pleeth, Robin Barter	3:56
8.	"Alma Gemela"	Fey, Robert Jazayeri	Robert Jazayeri	5:00
9.	"Grítalo"	Fey, Robert Jazayeri	Robert Jazayeri	3:49
10.	"Siento Caer"	Ash Alexander, Debra Stephenson, Jo Youle	Robert Jazayeri	3:55
11.	"Siento"	Fey, Graeme Pleeth, Robin Barter	Graeme Pleeth, Robin Barter	5:20

Disc Two
No.	Title	Writer(s)	Producer(s)	Length
1.	"Show Me"	Fey, Graeme Pleeth, Robin Barter	Graeme Pleeth, Robin Barter	3:24
2.	"The Other Side"	Fey, Graeme Pleeth, Robin Barter	Graeme Pleeth, Robin Barter	4:26
3.	"Vertigo"	Fey, Graeme Pleeth, Robin Barter	Graeme Pleeth, Robin Barter	5:20
4.	"Dressing to Kill"	Fey, Graeme Pleeth, Robin Barter	Graeme Pleeth, Robin Barter	3:55
5.	"Romeo And Juliet"	Fey, Robert Jazayeri	Robert Jazayeri	4:25
6.	"Ambition"	Fey, Graeme Pleeth, Robin Barter	Graeme Pleeth, Robin Barter	4:33
7.	"That's What Love's All About"	Fey, Graeme Pleeth, Robin Barter	Graeme Pleeth, Robin Barter	4:11
8.	"Come and Go"	Fey, Graeme Pleeth, Robin Barter	Graeme Pleeth, Robin Barter	3:55
9.	"The Way You Love Me"	Fey, Robert Jazayeri	Robert Jazayeri	3:51
10.	"Dark Angel"	Fey, Darryl Burke, K. Corbett, Robert Jazayeri	Robert Jazayeri, Daryl Burke	3:56
11.	"Say It Again"	Fey, Robert Jazayeri	Robert Jazayeri	3:51
12.	"To Be Honest"	Fey, Graeme Pleeth, Robin Barter	Graeme Pleeth, Robin Barter	4:34
13.	"Follow Me Down"	Ash Alexander, Debra Stephenson, Jo Youle	Robert Jazayeri	3:55
14.	"Siento"	Fey, Graeme Pleeth, Robin Barter	Graeme Pleeth, Robin Barter	5:20

== Personnel ==
From Allmusic.com

- Robin Barter - Guitar, Keyboards, Mixing, Producer, Programming
- Pete Craigie - Mix
- Paul Forat - A&R
- Jack Hues - Guitar Invited Player
- Robert 'Esmail' Jazayeri - Producer
- Ken Lewis - Mix
- Terry Mettam - Guitar, Guitar (Acoustic)
- Graeme Pleeth - Guitar, Keyboards, Mixing, Producer, Programming
- Maury Stern & Fey - Executive Producers
- Kent Wood - Keyboards
- Marino Parisotto - Photography

== Sales ==
Sales for Vértigo
Region	Certification	Certified units/sales
Mexico	—	75,000 (Note: Fey received a Gold record from Sony Music Mexico for selling 75,000 units of Vértigo in the country. However, AMPROFON did not update their database.)

== Release history ==
=== Spanish release ===
Region	Date	Format	Label	Catalog
Colombia	May 17, 2002	Special edition(CD, LP, Cassette)	Sony Music Entertainment	84619
Mexico	May 21, 2002	Special edition(CD, LP, Cassette)	Sony Music Entertainment	84619
Spain	May 21, 2002	Special edition(CD, LP, Cassette)	Sony Music Entertainment	84619
Argentina	May 21, 2002	Special edition(CD, LP, Cassette)	Sony Music Entertainment	
