= Tierna la Noche =

Studio album by Fey
- Released: 16 November 1996
- Recorded: 1996
- Studio: Homebase
- Genre: Dance-pop; Techno
- Label: Sony Mexico
- Producer: José Ramón Flórez

Fey chronology
Fey (1995)	Tierna la Noche (1996)	El Color de los Sueños (1998)

Professional ratings
Review scores
Source	Rating
Allmusic	4/5 stars

Tierna la Noche ("Tender Is the Night") is the second studio album by Mexican singer Fey, released on November 16, 1996, by Sony Music Mexico. Following its release, the album quickly climbed the charts, eventually reaching the number-one position, where it remained for more than three months. It stayed in the top 20 for over 40 weeks. Commercially, the album was highly successful and went on to become the best-selling album by a Latin female artist of the year, surpassing releases by Thalía, Paulina Rubio, and other established performers in the Mexican music scene.

The album's lead single, "Azúcar Amargo", reached number one in most Latin American countries and achieved moderate success on the US Latin music charts. All tracks from the album received radio airplay, although only two official music videos were produced.

Tierna la Noche reached the top 10 on the US Top Latin Albums chart, and all four of its singles charted within the top 20 of the US Hot Latin Tracks chart: "Azúcar Amargo" (No. 8), "Muévelo" (No. 9), "Las Lágrimas de Mi Almohada" (No. 13), and "Subidón" (No. 20). The album won Pop Album of the Year at the 1998 Latin Billboard Music Awards and has sold more than 1.5 million copies worldwide.

== Track listing ==
#	Tierna la Noche	Length	Writers
1.	"Muévelo"	4:07	Mario Ablanedo
2.	"Te Pertenezco"	3:53	David Boradoni, Mario Ablanedo
3.	"Bajo el Arcoiris"	4:37	Mario Ablanedo
4.	"Desmargaritando el Corazón"	4:51	David Boradoni, Mario Ablanedo
5.	"Bailando Sola"	4:16	David Boradoni, Mario Ablanedo
6.	"Azúcar Amargo"	4:42	David Boradoni, Mario Ablanedo
7.	"Popocatepetl"	4:08	Mario Ablanedo
8.	"Las Lágrimas de Mi Almohada"	4:43	J.R. Florez, Fredi Marugán
9.	"Subidón"	3:57	David Boradoni, Mario Ablanedo
10.	"Un Poco Loco"	4:17	David Boradoni, Mario Ablanedo
11.	"Tierna la Noche"	4:26	Lerry Nutti, Mario Ablanedo

== Bonus tracks ==
Five bonus tracks are available for legal free download on the Fey fan site: http://www.feyelectricidad.com. One is Bitter Sugar, the English version of Azúcar Amargo, and there is a Portuguese version of it called Açúcar Amargo. There is also an English version of Muévelo called Move It, and a Portuguese version of it, Mexe e Remexe. Te Pertenezco is translated only into Portuguese, and is called Ilusǎo Colorida.

== Promo ==
=== Unreleased singles ===
Tierna la Noche was remarkable in that every single song from the album received airplay and charted in the Mexican Top 40, although only eight of the eleven songs were officially released by the label. Tierna la noche, the most successful of these unreleased songs even peaked at number 7. Also receiving large airplay were Bailando Sola and Un Poco Loco.

Single information
"Azúcar Amargo"
- Released: 1996
- Chart positions: #1 Mexico, #1 Peru, #1 Colombia
"Muévelo"
- Released: 1996
- Chart positions: #1 Mexico, #1 Peru, #1 Colombia
"Te Pertenezco"
- Released: 1997
- Chart positions: #1 Mexico, #1 Peru
"Subidón"
- Released: 1997
- Chart positions: #1 Mexico, #1 Peru, #1 Colombia
"Bajo el Arcoiris"
- Released: 1997
- Chart positions: #1 Mexico,
"Las Lágrimas de Mi Almohada"
- Released: 1997
- Chart positions: #1 Mexico, #2 Peru, #5 Colombia
"Popocatepetl"
- Released: 1998
- Chart positions: #1 Mexico
"Desmargaritando el Corazón"
- Released: 1998
- Chart positions: #1 Mexico, #4 Peru

=== Tierna La Noche Tour ===
Fey went on a nationwide tour in 1996. This tour, Tierna La Noche Tour, was recorded and released on VHS. The track listing consisted of hits and album cuts from her two albums at that point:

1. "Múevelo"
2. Me Enamoro de Ti
3. "Bombón"
4. "Gatos en el Balcón"
5. "Desmargaritando el Corazón"
6. "Tierna la Noche"
7. "Te Pertenezco"
8. "Bajo el Arcoiris"
9. "Subidón"
10. "Como Pan y Chocolate"
11. "Bailando Bajo la Lluvia"
12. "Popocatepetl"
13. "Fiebre del Sábado (Rojo Y Blanco)"
14. "Media Naranja"
15. "Azúcar Amargo"
16. "La Noche Se Mueve"
17. "Múevelo*"

== Certifications ==
Region	Certification	Certified units/sales
Mexico (AMPROFON)	4× Gold	400,000^{^}
Summaries
Worldwide	—	1,500,000
^{^} Shipments figures based on certification alone.
