= El Color de los Sueños =

El Color De Los Sueños

Studio album by Fey
- Released: 3 November 1998
- Studio: PKO Studios (Madrid)
- Genre: Dance-pop; acoustic
- Length: 53:43
- Label: Sony Mexico
- Producer: José Ramón Flórez

Fey chronology
Tierna La Noche (1996)	El Color De Los Sueños (1998)	Vértigo (2002)

Red version cover

Singles from El Color De Los Sueños
- 1. "Ni Tu Ni Nadie" Released: 1998; 2. "Díselo Con Flores" Released: 1998; 3. "Cielo Liquido" Released: 1998; 4. "Canela" Released: 1999; 5. "Él" Released: 1999; 6. "No Tengo Novio" Released: September 1999

El Color de los Sueños ("The Color of Dreams") is the third studio album by Mexican singer Fey. It was released on 3 November 1998 by Sony Music Mexico.

== Background and release ==
Sony Music Mexico released the album in four different 3D cover editions, each featuring a distinct color. For its visual concept, Fey adopted an image inspired by elements of Indian culture. Despite becoming less commercially successful than her previous album, Tierna la Noche, the record reached number one in Mexico, with several of its singles achieving strong chart success. It also spawned a successful international tour of the same name.

In 1998, Sony released the singles "Ni Tú Ni Nadie", which reached number one in Mexico and Peru; "Díselo Con Flores", which peaked at number twelve in Peru; and "Cielo Líquido". The following year, "Canela", which reached number one in Mexico and number two in Peru, was released, followed by "Él" and "No Tengo Novio".

The album's comparatively lower sales have often been attributed to the controversies surrounding Fey at the time. Media speculation about her age, marital status, and religious beliefs became widespread, while her management drew criticism for allegedly attempting to cultivate a more "diva"-like public image. During this period, Fey unexpectedly announced her retirement from the music industry. In later interviews, she explained that the decision resulted from the demanding workload imposed by her then-manager and partner, Mauri Stern. Reflecting on the recording process, she stated, "I felt like I was losing my motivation. I needed to return to my essence and reconnect with what I loved".

== Track listing ==
1. "Cielo Líquido" 3:55 (J.R. Florez, David Boradoni)
2. "La Madrugada, Tú Y La Radio" 4:09 (J.R. Florez, David Boradoni)
3. "Ni Tu Ni Nadie" 4:25 (Mario Ablanedo)
4. "La Espuma De Los Días" 4:19 (J.R. Florez, David Boradoni)
5. "Díselo Con Flores" 4:06 (J.R. Florez; L. Nutti)
6. "Canela" 3:39 (J.R. Florez, David Boradoni)
7. "Vuelve" 3:46 (J.R. Florez; J. Giralt)
8. "Él" 4:20 (J.R. Florez, David Boradoni)
9. "Almíbar" 4:15 (J.R. Florez, David Boradoni)
10. "No Tengo Novio" 3:21 (J.R. Florez, David Boradoni)
11. "El Color De Los Sueños" 4:46 J.R. Florez; J. Giralt
12. "De Corazón A Corazón" 4:31(J.R. Florez, David Boradoni)
13. "Flor De Un día" 4:25 (J.R. Florez, David Boradoni)
14. "Iye" 0:58 (J.R. Florez, David Boradoni)

== Certifications ==
Region	Certification	Certified units/sales
Central America (CFC)	Gold	
Mexico (AMPROFON)	2× Gold	200,000^{^}
^{^} Shipments figures based on certification alone.
