= Azúcar amargo =

Single by Fey

from the album Tierna la Noche
- Released: 16 October 1996
- Genre: Dance pop
- Length: 4:42
- Label: Sony Mexico
- Songwriter: Mario Ablanedo
- Producers: Ablanedo, David Boradoni

Fey singles chronology
"Fiebre del Sábado (En la Noche)" (1996)	"Azúcar amargo" (1996)	"Muévelo" (1996)

"Azúcar amargo" (Bitter sugar) is a song recorded by Mexican singer Fey from her second album, Tierna la Noche (1996). Written by Mario Ablanedo and produced by Ablanedo alongside David Boradoni, the song was released as the album's lead single on 16 October 1996, by Sony Music Mexico. A dance-pop song, its lyrics describe a romantic relationship that brings both pleasure and suffering; the title, which translates to "bitter sugar", is used in the sense of bittersweet.

The song achieved commercial success across Latin America, reaching number one in Mexico, Argentina, Chile, Colombia, and Peru. In the United States, it topped Billboard's Latin Pop Airplay chart and peaked at number eight on the Hot Latin Tracks chart. "Azúcar amargo" is widely regarded as Fey's most commercially successful and signature song.

== Music video ==
The music video was directed by Luis de Velasco and premiered in October 1996. In the video, Fey is drawing a guy in a room while it's raining, then she is dancing down the rain and is singing the song, the video ends with Fey standing in the floor down the rain then appears a message in a black found that says: "La magia existe apesar de la realidad no temas verla" in English is "Despite reality, magic exists. Don't be afraid to see it".

== Chart performance ==
After the album was released in early November 1996. In the U.S., the song appeared on the Billboard Hot Latin Tracks chart for over 40 weeks, peaking at number 8.

== Weekly charts ==
Chart (1996)	Peak position
Argentina Singles Chart	1
Chile Singles Chart	1
Colombia Singles Chart	1
Monitor Latino (México)	2
Perú Singles Chart	1
US Billboard Latin Songs	8
US Billboard Latin Pop Songs	1
Venezuela	2

== Certifications ==
Certifications for "Azúcar amargo (90's Pop Tour Version)"
Region	Certification	Certified units/sales
Mexico (AMPROFON)	Gold	30,000^{‡}
^{‡} Sales+streaming figures based on certification alone.

== See also ==
- List of Billboard Latin Pop Airplay number ones of 1997
