= La Fuerza del Destino (album) =

Studio album by Fey
- Released: November 5, 2004
- Recorded: 2004
- Genre: Electropop
- Label: EMI, Capitol
- Producer: Carlos Jean

Fey chronology
Vértigo (2002)	La Fuerza del Destino (2004)	Faltan lunas (2006)

Singles from La Fuerza Del Destino
- 1. "La Fuerza Del Destino" Released: September 2004; 2. "Barco A Venus" Released: January 2005; 3. "Aire" Released: April 2005; 4. "Me Cuesta Tanto Olvidarte" Released: July 2005; 5. "Un Año Más" Released: December 2005

Professional ratings
Review scores
Source	Rating
Allmusic	link

La Fuerza del Destino (The Force of Destiny) is Fey's fifth studio album, released in December 2004. The album contains twelve tracks the popular Spanish band Mecano made famous in the 80s and early 90s.

The album's first single La Fuerza del Destino became the album's biggest hit, as it quickly topped the charts in Latin America and became No.1 in Mexico, Central America and Chile, as well as a top 5 hit in the world Latin charts. The album itself became No. 5 in Mexico and succeeded in positioning itself among the top 50 Latin albums in the United States, at #42.

The album was nominated to a Latin Grammy for Best Female Pop Vocal Album in 2005; but lost to Escucha by Italian singer Laura Pausini.

The album to date has sold more than 550,000 copies worldwide.

== Track listing ==
#	La Fuerza del Destino	Length
1.	"Mujer Contra Mujer"	4:08
2.	"Aire"	4:29
3.	"Barco A Venus"	3:28
4.	"Hoy No Me Puedo Levantar"	4:20
5.	"Me Colé en una Fiesta"	3:47
6.	"Cruz de Navajas"	4:26
7.	"Un Año Más"	4:08
8.	"La Fuerza del Destino"	4:56
9.	"Ay Que Pesado"	4:23
10.	"Los Amantes"	3:07
11.	"Me Cuesta Tanto Olvidarte"	3:05
12.	"Busca Algo Barato"	3:35

== Singles ==
Single information
"La Fuerza del Destino"
- Released: November, 2004
"Barco a Venus"
- Released: February, 2005
"Me Cuesta Tanto Olvidarte"
- Released: July, 2005
"Un Año Más"
- Released: December 2006

== Certifications ==
Region	Certification	Certified units/sales
Mexico (AMPROFON)	Gold	50,000^{^}
^{^} Shipments figures based on certification alone.
