= Mecano discography =

- Studio albums: 6
- Live albums: 1
- Compilation albums: 9
- Singles: 41
- Video albums: 5

The Spanish pop band Mecano released six studio albums, one live album, nine compilation albums, five video albums and more than 40 singles. In their career, it is estimated that Mecano has sold 25 million albums worldwide.

== Albums ==
=== Studio albums ===
Title	Album details	Peak chart positions					Certifications
Title	Album details	SPA	FRA	GER	NL	SWI	Certifications
Mecano	Released: 5 April 1982; Label: CBS; Formats: LP, MC	1	—	—	—	—	SPA: 5× Platinum
¿Dónde está el país de las hadas?	Released: 30 May 1983; Label: CBS; Formats: LP, MC	1	—	—	—	—	
Ya viene el Sol	Released: 16 October 1984; Label: CBS; Formats: LP, MC	9	—	—	—	—	SPA: Gold
Entre el cielo y el suelo	Released: 17 June 1986; Label: Ariola; Formats: CD, LP, MC	2	—	—	—	—	SPA: 6× Platinum
Descanso dominical	Released: 6 July 1988; Label: Ariola; Formats: CD, LP, MC; A French and an Italian edition were also released (with the latter titled Figlio della luna)	1	7	—	9	—	FRA: Platinum; SPA: 13× Platinum
Aidalai	Released: 14 June 1991; Label: Ariola; Formats: CD, LP, MC; A French and an Italian edition were also released	1	21	93	43	29	FRA: 2× Gold; SPA: 10× Platinum
"—" denotes releases that did not chart or were not released in that territory.

=== Live albums ===
Title	Album details	Peak chart positions
Title	Album details	SPA
Mecano: En Concierto	Released: 29 June 1985; Label: CBS; Formats: LP, MC	61 (Note: Charted in 2006.)

=== Compilation albums ===
Title	Album details	Peak chart positions					Certifications
Title	Album details	SPA	BEL (WA)	FRA	US Latin Albums	US Latin Pop Albums	Certifications
Éxitos de Mecano	Released: August 1984; Label: CBS; Formats: LP, MC; Venezuela-only release	—	—	—	—	—	
Lo Último de Mecano	Released: 1986; Label: CBS; Formats: LP, MC	—	—	—	—	—	
15 grandes éxitos	Released: April 1988; Label: CBS; Formats: CD, LP, MC	19	—	—	—	—	
20 grandes canciones	Released: 21 August 1989; Label: CBS; Formats: 2xCD, 2xLP, 2xMC	2	—	—	—	—	
Ana José Nacho	Released: 23 March 1998; Label: Ariola/BMG; Formats: 2xCD, 2xMC; A French edition was also released	1	15	4	28	10	FRA: Gold; SPA: 3× Platinum
Obras completas	Released: 27 September 2005; Label: Sony Music; Formats: 8xCD box set	5	—	—	—	—	SPA: Gold
Grandes éxitos	Released: 18 October 2005; Label: Sony BMG; Formats: 2xCD+DVD	2	—	—	—	—	MEX: 1× Platinum; SPA: 3× Platinum
Siglo XXI	Released: 17 November 2009; Label: Sony Music; Formats: 2xCD	4	—	—	—	—	SPA: Gold
Esencial Mecano	Released: 18 June 2013; Label: Sony Music/BMG; Formats: 2xCD, digital download	49	—	—	—	—	
"—" denotes releases that did not chart or were not released in that territory.

=== Video albums ===
Title	Album details
En concierto	Released: 1989; Label: BMG Video; Formats: VHS
Los vídeos	Released: 1992; Label: BMG Video/Ariola; Formats: VHS
En directo	Released: 1992; Label: BMG Video/Ariola; Formats: VHS, LaserDisc
Grandes éxitos	Released: 18 October 2005; Label: Sony BMG; Formats: DVD (with 2xCD)
Mecanografía (La historia en imágenes)	Released: 21 March 2006; Label: Sony BMG; Formats: 4xDVD

== Singles ==
Title	Year	Peak chart positions										Certifications	Album
Title	Year	SPA	BEL (FL)	CHI	ECU	FRA	GER	IT	MEX	NL	US Latin	Certifications	Album
"Hoy No Me Puedo Levantar"	1981	4	—	—	—	—	—	—	—	—	—	SPA: Platinum	Mecano
"Perdido en mi habitación"	1981	2	—	—	—	—	—	—	—	—	—	SPA: Gold	Mecano
"Me Colé en Una Fiesta"	1982	1	—	—	—	—	—	—	—	—	—	SPA: Gold	Mecano
"Maquillaje"	1982	4	—	—	—	—	—	—	—	—	—		Mecano
"No me enseñen la lección"	1982	—	—	—	—	—	—	—	—	—	—		Mecano
"Barco a Venus"	1983	1	—	—	—	—	—	—	—	—	—		¿Dónde está el país de las hadas?
"La fiesta nacional"	1983	13	—	—	—	—	—	—	—	—	—		¿Dónde está el país de las hadas?
"The Uninvited Guest" (Note: English-language version of "Me colé en una fiesta".)	1983	—	—	—	—	—	—	—	—	—	—		Non-album single
"El amante de fuego"	1983	—	—	—	—	—	—	—	—	76	—		¿Dónde está el país de las hadas?
"Japón"	1984	2	—	—	—	—	—	—	—	—	—		Ya viene el sol
"Busco algo barato"	1984	12	—	—	—	—	—	—	—	—	—		Ya viene el sol
"No pintamos nada"	1984	—	—	—	—	—	—	—	—	—	—		Ya viene el sol
"Hawaii-Bombay"	1985	11	—	—	—	—	—	—	—	—	—		Ya viene el sol
"Ya viene el sol"	1985	—	—	—	—	—	—	—	—	—	—		Ya viene el sol
"Ay qué pesado"	1986	22	—	—	5	—	—	—	—	—	17		Entre el cielo y el suelo
"Baila con Mecano"	1986	—	—	—	—	—	—	—	—	—	—		Non-album single
"Cruz de navajas"	1986	7	—	—	—	—	—	—	—	—	49		Entre el cielo y el suelo
"Me cuesta tanto olvidarte"	1986	29	—	—	—	—	—	—	—	—	—		Entre el cielo y el suelo
"No es serio este cementerio"	1987	31	—	—	—	—	—	—	—	—	—		Entre el cielo y el suelo
"Hijo de la luna"	1987	29	18	—	—	—	45	—	—	5	—	SPA: Platinum	Entre el cielo y el suelo
"No hay marcha en Nueva York"	1988	17	—	—	1	—	—	—	—	—	—		Descanso dominical
"Los amantes"	1988	34	—	—	—	—	—	—	9	—	32		Descanso dominical
"Mujer contra mujer"	1988	—	—	—	—	—	—	—	—	—	—		Descanso dominical
"Un año más"	1988	19 (Note: Chart peak is from 2010.)	—	—	—	—	—	—	—	—	—		Descanso dominical
"Figlio della luna" (Italy-only release)	1989	—	—	—	—	—	—	15	—	—	—		Figlio della luna
"La fuerza del destino"	1989	—	—	—	—	—	—	—	—	83	—		Descanso dominical
"El blues del esclavo"	1989	—	—	—	—	—	—	—	3	—	—		Descanso dominical
"Une femme avec une femme" (Note: French-language version of "Mujer contra mujer".)	1990	—	—	—	—	1	—	—	—	—	—	FRA: Gold	Descanso dominical (French edition)
"Dis-moi lune d'argent" (Note: French-language version of "Hijo de la luna".)	1991	—	—	—	—	6	—	—	—	—	—	FRA: Silver	Aidalai (French edition)
"El 7 de septiembre"	1991	1	—	4	—	—	—	—	4	—	—	SPA: Gold	Aidalai
"Tú"	1991	—	—	—	—	—	—	—	—	47	—		Aidalai
"Naturaleza muerta"	1991	—	—	—	—	—	—	—	—	—	—		Aidalai
"Nature morte" (Note: French-language version of "Naturaleza muerta".)	1991	—	—	—	—	39	—	—	—	—	—		Aidalai (French edition)
"Dalai Lama"	1991	3	—	—	—	—	—	—	—	—	—		Aidalai
"Una rosa es una rosa"	1992	10	—	—	—	—	94	—	—	64	—		Aidalai
"El fallo positivo"	1992	7	—	—	—	—	—	—	—	—	—		Aidalai
"El club de los humildes"	1998	1	—	—	—	—	—	—	—	—	—		Ana José Nacho
"Stereosexual"	1998	—	—	—	—	—	—	—	—	—	—		Ana José Nacho
"Cuerpo y corazón"	1998	—	—	—	—	—	—	—	—	—	—		Ana José Nacho
"Otro muerto"	1998	—	—	—	—	—	—	—	—	—	—		Ana José Nacho
"Canción de los piratas"	1998	—	—	—	—	—	—	—	—	—	—		Disney Presenta: Grandes éxitos en español
"—" denotes releases that did not chart or were not released in that territory.
