= Hoy no me puedo levantar =

- Music: Nacho Cano; José María Cano
- Lyrics: Nacho Cano; José María Cano
- Book: David Serrano
- Productions: 2005 Madrid, Spain; 2006 Mexico City, Mexico; 2007 Mexican tour 2008 Spanish tour 2009 Barcelona, Spain; 2013 Madrid, Spain (revival); 2014 Mexico City, Mexico (revival); 2017 Mexico City, Mexico (revival)

Hoy no me puedo levantar (Today I Can't Get up) is a Spanish jukebox musical, with music and lyrics by José María Cano and Nacho Cano, former members of the band Mecano. Based on 32 of the band's greatest hits and named after their first single, the musical centers on a pair of impoverished musicians trying to be part of La Movida Madrileña, after the fall of Francisco Franco's dictatorship. Through an analysis of the 1980s, the musical portrays the condition of these boys trying to survive in Madrid, under the shadow of drugs and AIDS. The musical ran for four seasons in Madrid's Rialto Theatre (former Movistar Theatre) and for three seasons in Mexico City's Centro Cultural Telmex and Teatro Aldama. It was produced by Drive in Spain and OCESA Teatro in Mexico.

== Background ==
In the 1980s Mecano became a very successful and influential band in Spain and many other Spanish-speaking countries. Although the band split in September 1992, their songs continued to be very popular. This was one of the reasons why Ángel Suarez, after seeing the success Broadway musicals have in Madrid, imagined the first musical completely produced in Spain using songs from Mecano. Together with Nacho Cano and José Manuel Lorenzo, they developed a story, written by David Serrano, around the lyrics that were made popular by the band.

== Synopsis ==
=== Act One ===
Cast performing the overture and title song of Hoy No Me Puedo Levantar

The play is set on Madrid in 1981 and revolves around Mario, a guy from a small town who wants to move to the city following the dream of creating his own band ("Hoy no me puedo levantar"). He and his best friend, Colate, are prepared to move out, but Colate's girlfriend, Ana, does not want him to leave. After Mario promises that he will take care of Colate, she finally agrees and they set off to Madrid ("Quiero vivir en la ciudad"). I

In Madrid, they go to many bars but are not allowed to play at any. They arrive at El 33, where they get jobs as waiters in order to earn the money that they badly need to survive and buy instruments. They find out that there will be a band contest, and the winner will be able to record an album. Afterwards, they go to another bar to find more members for their band; there they meet Panchi and Guillermo ("Hoy no me puedo levantar (reprise)"/"No hay marcha en Nueva York").

Back in El 33, Guillermo tries to create a new look for the band with the help of some gay stylists ("Maquillaje") and Mario meets a girl named Maria, whom he falls in love with. Later he confesses his love, but she is not interested in him ("Por la cara"). Guillermo introduces them to Patricia and, thanks to Panchi, they discover drugs and start smoking marijuana ("Hawaii-Bombay"). Panchi introduces Colate to Churchi, a very popular drug dealer in Madrid, and they start using cocaine. Ana goes to Madrid to visit Colate but is disappointed when she finds him drugged, with many people sleeping in the same room, and decides to leave ("Quédate en Madrid").

Anselmo, the owner of El 33, teaches Mario bulerías to conquer Maria ("Una Rosa es Una Rosa") but she still refuses. Maria tells Patricia about the infidelities of men and proposes they become lesbians, but later says this was a joke ("Mujer contra Mujer"). After Panchi interrupts the scene, Maria is troubled because she thinks Mario is just going to hurt her ("Lía").

Colate spends all the money they have been saving to buy their instruments on drugs, and he tells the band members it was stolen from him. Anselmo decides to pay for the instruments and be the manager of the band, so they change their name from Luna to Rulé ("Me colé en una fiesta"). Rulé gets to the final of the contest and they win ("No controles"). Afterwards the band members celebrate. At the party, Churchi gives Colate a bag with heroin as a gift for his success. Mario and Maria have a fight, but in the end Maria gives in and they start going out ("Medley 1").

=== Act Two ===
Some years have passed, and Rulé's album has been a big hit. While Colate and Panchi smoke marijuana on the roof of El 33 they fantasize about Dalí and Laika ("'Eungenio' Salvador Dalí/Laika"). Afterwards, Anselmo, Mario and Guillermo find them and tell them they are going to produce the theme of a TV show ("Aire"). Colate goes back to his apartment and has a drug overdose ("Perdido en mi habitación").

Some months later they all get together in El 33 to celebrate that their single "Aire" is a number one hit. Maria does not stay long because she has to work the next day and leaves, but she forgets her purse. When she returns she finds Mario making out with another girl, gets mad, and leaves. Mario writes a song for her, but Maria is offended by the song and they break up ("Cruz de Navajas").

Mario goes to find Colate, but he is not at his apartment. When he is about to leave, Colate walks in with a bag of heroin in his hand. Mario tries to convince him to stop using drugs, and the two get into a fight ("Barco a Venus"). Mario decides to become a solo artist and leaves the band ("El uno, el dos y el tres").

Four years after the band won the contest, Maria shows up in El 33 looking for Mario, but he is not there. She and Anselmo talk about Mario's career and are depressed ("El 7 de septiembre"). When Maria is leaving, Mario walks in and spend the night together ("Hijo de la Luna").

On New Year's Eve of 1987, Maria, Anselmo, Colate, Panchi and Guillermo get together to celebrate ("Un año mas"). Colate is very skinny and weak and leaves the party early. Colate goes to find Mario in his new apartment, but Mario refuses to talk to him and throws him out. The audience learns that Colate has AIDS and he wanted to say goodbye to Mario. Colate phones Ana, who is now pregnant and married, and says goodbye; afterwards Colate hangs himself in his apartment ("El fallo positivo"). Panchi finds Colate's body and cries. Mario hears the news from Colate and feels very guilty and lonely ("Me cuesta tanto olvidarte").

Mario goes to the cemetery, where he finds all his old friends. After they leave, Mario stays behind and Colate's ghost appears to him ("No es serio este cementerio"). He tells Mario to go back to Madrid and form the band with Anselmo, instead of him, and get Maria back. Mario does this and goes back to El 33 to meet Maria ("La fuerza del destino" / "Vivimos siempre juntos" / Medley 2).

== Aspects of the show ==
=== Musical numbers ===
Act One

- Overture
- Hoy no me puedo levantar
- Quiero vivir en la ciudad
- Hoy no me puedo levantar (reprise)
- No hay marcha en Nueva York
- Maquillaje
- Por la cara
- Hawaii-Bombay
- Quédate en Madrid
- Una rosa es una rosa
- Mujer contra mujer
- Lía
- Me colé en una fiesta
- No controles
- Medley 1 (J.C., El amargo del pomelo, Los amantes, No controles, Quédate en Madrid, Tú, Te busqué, Sube Sube, La fuerza del destino)

Act Two

- "Eungenio" Salvador Dalí/Laika
- Aire
- Perdido en mi habitación
- Cruz de Navajas
- Barco a Venus
- El uno, el dos y el tres
- El 7 de septiembre
- Hijo de la Luna
- Un año mas
- El fallo positivo
- Me cuesta tanto olvidarte
- No es serio este cementerio
- La fuerza del destino
- Vivimos siempre juntos
- Medley 2 (Naturaleza muerta, Dalai Lama, Cruz de Navajas, Maquillaje, No es serio este cementerio, Me colé en una fiesta, Vivimos siempre juntos, Hoy no me puedo levantar)

=== Interaction and multimedia ===
The musical is interactive, and the audience is encouraged to dance and sing in all musical pieces, especially in the last medley. The fourth wall is broken many times, stating that the events shown are a musical, showing crew members, and interacting with the public (actors come down from the stage and dance, sing and even place wigs and costumes on members of the audience). A large screen on stage shows live images from the audience, the actors, the orchestra, along with other pre-recorded videos, which ultimately become important part of the play. In one scene, the characters discuss the plot and their performance in the play.

== Productions ==
=== En tu Fiesta me Colé ===
A modified version of the play called En tu Fiesta me Colé ("I Crashed your Party") was shown in Madrid, Spain. This was a condensed version of the musical (an hour and a half) without the sex and drug themes portrayed in the original, made to be more family-friendly.

=== Mexican production ===
On 24 May 2006 a Mexican production opened in Mexico City with Nacho Cano involved in the casting and co-direction. This production was almost identical to the original and had a few minor changes in order to be suitable for the Mexican audience. The name of Panchi was changed to Chakas and the name of Anselmo was changed to Venancio, and is the only character portrayed as a Spaniard (although the play takes place in Spain); also a group called Las Gelatinas (The Gelatins) sings a short part at the beginning of the song "No Controles"; this was made as a reference/parody of the real group Flans (cf. Flan) which made popular the song in Mexico. All the pre-recorded videos were reshot to set some scenes of the play in Mexico City. The interaction with the audience is nearly missing, except for "Maquillaje", "Me colé en una fiesta", and the finale.

Ana Torroja, Gloria Trevi, Ha*Ash, Moenia and Christian Chávez from RBD have been special guests to appear in the musical. In May 2007, when the Mexican production turned its first anniversary, the play had the special performances of Nacho Cano and the rock/pop band Motel. On 15 July 2007 the Mexican production closed for the first season; afterwards the play went on tour through Mexico and Latin America in the form of Hoy No Me Puedo Levantar, el Concierto.

=== Hoy No Me Puedo Levantar, el Concierto ===
After the great success of the Mexican production, OCESA Teatro and Nacho Cano created a new condensed production of Hoy No Me Puedo Levantar, that opened September 20, 2007 in Mexico City. This new version centers entirely in the songs, but not leaving aside the main plot. Four songs were deleted ("Maquillaje", "Hawaii-Bombay", "Lía" and "'Eungenio' Salvador Dalí/Laika") and a song was added ('"Ay que pesado"). The length is approximately two hours, one hour and a half less than the original musical.

== Casts ==
	Madrid Original Cast	Mexico City Original Cast
Mario	Miquel Fernández	Alan Estrada
María	Inma Cuesta	Fernanda Castillo
Colate	Javier Godino	Luis Gerardo Méndez
Panchi	Diego París	n/a
Guillermo	Andreu Castro	José Daniel Figueroa
Ana	Fanni Alcázar	Jannette Chao
Anselmo	Javier Navares	n/a
Patricia	Natalia Vergara	Valeria Vera
Malena	Paloma Arimón	n/a
Chakas	n/a	Rogelio Suárez
Venancio	n/a	Gerardo González

== Reception ==
The play was a success in both Spain and Mexico, having various sell-outs. It has also created a cult-like following among teenagers like Rent did, including several persons that have seen the play more than a hundred times. In September 2007, after two years of its opening, it was announced that the musical has been seen by more than 1,500,000 spectators, making this play the most successful original production in Spanish of all time.
