= Descanso Dominical =

Descanso dominical
- Spanish/Latin America edition cover

Studio album by Mecano
- Released: 24 May 1988
- Recorded: 1987–1988, 1989
- Genres: Pop; new wave
- Length: 56:08
- Label: Ariola Eurodisc S.A.
- Producer: Mecano

Mecano chronology
Entre el cielo y el suelo (1986)	Descanso dominical (1988)	Aidalai (1991)

Singles from Descanso Dominical
- 1. "No Hay Marcha en Nueva York" Released: 16 June 1988; 2. "Los amantes" Released: 29 August 1988; 3. "Mujer contra mujer" / "Un año más" Released: 5 December 1988; 4. "La fuerza del destino" Released: 3 April 1989; 5. "El blues del esclavo" Released: 3 July 1989

Descanso dominical (Spanish for Sunday Break) is the fifth studio album by Spanish pop band Mecano. It was released on 24 May 1988, in Spain and Spanish America, 1989 in Italy and 1990 in France under Ariola Records. This was the album that reaffirmed their stardom as worldwide artists. Before its release, this album was intended to be a 2-disc album due to the large amount of material, but that intent was cancelled. The album is also known in France as Une Femme Avec Une Femme and as Figlio della Luna in Italy. The title of the album was taken from a line in the fifth single "El blues del esclavo".

After gaining success and global recognition with their fourth studio album Entre el cielo y el suelo (1986) with characterized ballads and low-rhythm songs that tell stories, Mecano changed their sound and recuperated their new wave textures from their first two records, Mecano and ¿Dónde está el país de las hadas?.

The album spawned 6 singles, "No Hay Marcha en Nueva York", "Los Amantes", "Mujer Contra Mujer", "Un Año Más", "La Fuerza del Destino" and "El Blues del Esclavo", all of them being released from June 1988 to July 1989. The language-adapted single, "Une Femme Avec Un Femme", was also released to promote Descanso Dominical in France.

All of them received great commercial success, specially chart-toppers singles "Mujer Contra Mujer", "No Hay Marcha en Nueva York" and "Un Año Más". Descanso Dominical was tied with their first studio album, Mecano, as the band's album with most number ones. The album's commercial success led to it becoming the best selling record internationally from the band, as well as one of the best-selling albums in Spain. In addition, it is also the best selling album by a band in the country.

== Background ==
With Entre el cielo y el suelo (1986) Spanish band Mecano started gaining worldwide notoriety recognition led by the successful singles "Ay, Qué Pesado" and "Me Cuesta Tanto Olvidarte", which become hits across the countries in Spanish America as one of the Spanish language international promise artists. The translations of their singles "Mujer Contra Mujer", "Hijo de la luna" to French and Italian respectively also skyrocketed Mecano to stardom in some European countries. Meanwhile, in Spain, "Ay, Qué Pesado", "Hijo de La Luna", "Cruz de Navajas" and "Me Cuesta Tanto Olvidarte" become breakthrough hits topping the Spanish charts for several weeks and leading Mecano to the top of best selling artist in Spain again.

For their next record, Mecano wanted to change their sound from ballads and low songs into a new wave and accelerated pop rhythms sound, recuperating their first records' so but with a more natural sound but without abundance on synthesizers.

== Reception ==
Professional ratings
Review scores
Source	Rating
AllMusic	3.0/5 stars

This album was well received by the critics in general; it was categorized as the best release from this group. The songs, such as "La fuerza del destino" (The power of fate) and "Mujer contra mujer" (Woman against woman) topped the charts all over Latin America and Spain.

== Spanish/Latin American edition ==
- Six singles were released from this album. The first one was "No hay marcha en Nueva York" (There is no party in New York), which is known for its sound reminiscent of the orchestras of the 1950s because of the saxophone and drums. It was released on 20 June 1988.
- The second single was "Los amantes" (The lovers), with Ana Torroja singing high notes on this track. The single topped out at position No. 32 on the Billboard Hot Latin Songs.

It was released on 28 August 1988.

- The 3rd and 4th singles were promoted simultaneously, "Mujer contra mujer" and "Un año más" (One year more). Mujer contra mujer is a contemplation on a lesbian love that cries for respect, while "Un año más" tells about New Year's Eve on Puerta del Sol. Both songs were released on 5 December 1988.

"Mujer contra mujer" has versions in French and Italian, which also reached No. 1 in France and Italy; it was also an overwhelming hit in Latin America, and most remarkably in the cases of Chile, Cuba, Ecuador, Puerto Rico and Nicaragua, where homosexuality was punished in their laws at that time. In Mexico, the song was banned when it was first promoted, but its success helped to revoke the ban.

Since the very first day of its launch, "Mujer contra mujer" caused scandal and polemic; among other things, the Catholic Church threatened to excommunicate the members of the group, inasmuch as the topic of the song was considered lascivious. The video of the song also had problems of censorship; for example, in the Dominican Republic it was prohibited according to the laws of entertainment, which ban any video related to homosexuality or bisexuality. However, it was a resounding hit that was demanded by viewers all over Latin America.

"Mujer contra mujer" has been a source of inspiration for other singers and groups like Rammstein who composed a song titled "Mann gegen Mann" (Man against man) included in the album Rosenrot, also Franco De Vita based his song "Rosa y clavel" (Rose and carnation) on this song. It is considered one of the first gay anthems in Spanish.

- The 5th single was "La fuerza del destino", a romantic song composed by Nacho Cano and dedicated to the writer Coloma Fernández Armero. Penélope Cruz (15 years old at the time) appeared as an actress for the very first time in the video of this song.
- The 6th single was "El blues del esclavo" (The blues of the slave). This song is a satire of the abolition of slavery in the United States and the struggle of Martin Luther King Jr.

Tracks

1. El Cine 4:15 (Ignacio Cano)
2. No Hay Marcha en Nueva York 4:00 (José María Cano)
3. Mujer Contra Mujer 4:05 (José María Cano)
4. Los Amantes 2:52 (Ignacio Cano)
5. La Fuerza del Destino 5:17 (Ignacio Cano)
6. Quédate en Madrid 2:18 (Ignacio Cano)
7. Laika 4:37 Only on CD and select cassette editions (Ignacio Cano)
8. El Blues del Esclavo 4:36 (José María Cano)
9. "Eungenio" Salvador Dalí 5:23 (José María Cano)
10. Por la Cara 3:04 (Ignacio Cano)
11. Un Año Más 4:29 (Ignacio Cano)
12. Héroes de la Antártida 5:09 (José María Cano)
13. Hermano Sol, Hermana Luna 3:33 Only on CD (Ignacio Cano)
14. Fábula 2:04 Only on CD (José María Cano)
15. Une Femme Avec Une Femme 4:05 On the 2005 edition (José María Cano)

== Italian edition ==
The Italian edition was retitled "Figlio della Luna". This album has eight tracks from the Spain edition and two tracks from Entre El Cielo y El Suelo, all re-written in Italian, except for "Por La Cara," which is instrumental. It was the first album that Mecano recorded in a language other than Spanish, and the only one that didn't include any song in Spanish. All the songs were adapted in Italian by M. Luberti. "Mi costa tanto scordarti" (It's so hard for me to forget you,) was also recorded, but it was taken out of the final selection. The album itself didn't meet sales expectations in Italy despite the success of the tracks.

Tracks

1. Figlio della Luna (Hijo de la Luna) 4:18
2. La forza del destino (La fuerza del destino) 5:10
3. Croce di lame (Cruz de navajas) 5:06
4. Uno di quegli amanti (Los amantes) 2:51
5. Fermati a Madrid (Quédate en Madrid) 2:17
6. Vado a Nuova York (No hay marcha en Nueva York) 4:16
7. Per lei contro di lei (Mujer contra mujer) 4:05
8. Il cinema (El cine) 4:18
9. Un anno di più (Un año más) 4:29
10. Por la cara (instrumental) 3:06

=== Singles/Maxi singles ===
- Figlio della Luna/Un anno di più (20 February 1989)
- Figlio della Luna (Maxi single, 20 February 1989, it includes just one song)
- Croce di lame/Cruz de navajas (1989)

== French edition ==
"Descanso Dominical" was also edited in France in 1990 with some variants. This was the first album by Mecano to be addressed to a French audience, even though the release has just one song in French "Une femme avec une femme" (A woman with a woman), an adaptation of "Mujer contra mujer" under the supervision of P. Grosz. It had better results than the Italian edition.

The first edition of "Descanso Dominical" for France, was published in the same year as the Spain edition, 1988. The second edition, that includes "Une femme avec une femme", was not recorded until 1990. Mecano got this track to stay for 8 weeks in the French ranking of sales and the track reached the Top 50.

Tracks

1. Hijo De La Luna 4:18
2. La Fuerza Del Destino 5:17
3. El Blues Del Esclavo 4:36
4. Los Amantes 2:52
5. Mujer Contra Mujer 4:05
6. Por La Cara 3:04
7. Une femme avec une femme 4:08
8. No Hay Marcha En Nueva York 4:00
9. El Cine 4:15
10. "Eungenio" Salvador Dalí 5:23
11. Un Año Mas 4:29
12. Quédate En Madrid 2:18

=== Singles ===
- Une femme avec une femme/Mujer contra mujer (May 1990)

== German edition ==
1. Hijo de la Luna 4:18
2. La fuerza del destino 5:10
3. Cruz de navajas 5:06
4. Los amantes 2:51
5. Quédate en Madrid 2:17
6. No hay marcha en Nueva York 4:16
7. Mujer contra mujer 4:05
8. El cine 4:18
9. Un año más 4:29
10. Por la cara 3:06

== Alternate European/Latin American edition ==
1. Hijo de la Luna 4:15
2. La fuerza del destino 5:13
3. El blues del esclavo 4:36
4. Los amantes 2:52
5. Quédate en Madrid 2:18
6. Por la cara 3:04
7. No hay marcha en Nueva York 4:00
8. Mujer contra mujer 4:05
9. El cine 4:15
10. "Eungenio" Salvador Dalí 5:23
11. Un año más 4:29

== Charts ==
=== Album charts ===
#	Chart	Peak Position	Date
1.	"Billboard Latin Pop Albums"	#16	16 December 1989
2.	"Spain Album Charts" (2nd Edition)	#32	7 August 2005

=== Single charts ===
Date	Title	Chart Positions													B-Sides
Date	Title	U.S. H.Lat.	ESP	MEX	CRI	CHL	COL	NIC	ECU	DOM	CUB	NLD	FRA	ITA	B-Sides
20 June 1988	No hay marcha en Nueva York	–	9	10	13	2	9	10	1	15	20	–	–	–	Laika; Por la cara
28 August 1988	Los amantes	32	2	10	15	10	19	9	15	10	21	–	–	–	Fábula
5 December 1988	Mujer contra mujer	–	1	1	1	1	1	1	1	1	1	–	–	–	Hermano Sol, hermana Luna
5 December 1988	Un año más	–	10	9	11	8	5	2	8	10	10	–	–	–	Por la cara
3 April 1989	La fuerza del destino	–	1	1	1	1	1	1	1	1	1	83	–	–	El Cine
3 July 1989	El blues del esclavo	–	19	3	26	30	40	35	50	40	–	–	–	–	Héroes de la Antártida
May 1990	Une femme avec une femme	–	–	–	–	–	–	–	–	–	–	–	1	1	Mujer contra mujer

== Certifications and sales ==
Region	Certification	Certified units/sales
Belgium	—	30,000
France (SNEP)	Platinum	300,000^{*}
Mexico	—	400,000
Netherlands	—	30,000
Spain (Promusicae)	11× Platinum	1,200,000
Switzerland (IFPI Switzerland)	Gold	25,000^{^}
Summaries
Worldwide	—	2,200,000
^{*} Sales figures based on certification alone.^{^} Shipments figures based on certification alone.

== See also ==
- List of best-selling Latin albums
- List of best-selling albums in Spain
