= Los Amantes (song) =

Single by Mecano

from the album Descanso Dominical
- Language: Spanish
- English title: The Lovers
- B-side: "Fábula"
- Released: August 28, 1988
- Recorded: 1987
- Genre: Electro-pop
- Length: 2:52
- Label: Ariola Records
- Songwriter: Nacho Cano
- Producer: Mecano

Mecano singles chronology
"No Hay Marcha en Nueva York" (1988)	"Los Amantes" (1988)	"Mujer Contra Mujer" (1988)

"Los Amantes" (Spanish for "The Lovers") is the second single released by Spanish pop band Mecano in 1988 under Ariola Records, for their fifth studio album Descanso Dominical (1988). It became a great success in Spain and also in Latin America.

In 2006, band singer Ana Torroja re-recorded the song, giving it a mid-2000s pop sound for her album Me Cuesta Tanto Olvidarte (2006). Torroja's new version received airplay and gave the song some fame again.

== Formats ==
7" inch single

No.	Title	Length
1.	"Los Amantes"	2:52
2.	"Fábula"	2:04

12" Maxisingle

No.	Title	Length
1.	"Los Amantes"	4:20
2.	"La Antártida"	5:09

== Charts ==
Chart (1989)	Peak position
Ecuador (UPI)	1
US Hot Latin Songs (Billboard)	32
