= Mecano (disambiguation) =

Mecano was a pop music band from Madrid, Spain formed by Ana Torroja, Nacho Cano and José María Cano.

Mecano may also refer to:

- Mecano (album), first studio album recorded by the band in 1982
- Mecano, a person who was born in the city of Mecca

== See also ==
- Meccano, a British model construction system
- Mecanoo, a Dutch architecture firm
