= Maquillaje =

Maquillaje (Spanish for "make-up") may refer to:

- Maquillaje, a 2001 album by Zurdok
- "Maquillaje", a 1986 song by Mecano from Mecano
