= Me Colé en Una Fiesta =

Single by Mecano

from the album Mecano
- Language: Spanish
- English title: "I Snuck Into a Party"
- B-side: "Boda en Londres"
- Released: March 22, 1982
- Recorded: 1981–1982
- Studio: (Spain) Estudios Escorpio
- Genre: Synth-pop
- Length: 4:14
- Label: Discos CBS
- Songwriter: Ignacio Cano
- Producers: Nacho Cano, Jorge Álvarez

Mecano singles chronology
"Perdido en mi Habitación" (1981)	"Me Colé en Una Fiesta" (1982)	"Maquillaje" (1982)

"Me Colé en Una Fiesta" (Spanish for "I Snuck Into a Party") is a song written and performed by the Spanish band Mecano. It was released as the third single of their debut studio album Mecano by Discos CBS on March 22, 1982.

Having released two singles ("Hoy No Me Puedo Levantar" and "Perdido en Mi Habitación") almost a year earlier, Mecano released "Me Colé en Una Fiesta" whilst they were still relatively unknown.

Immediately following its release, the song become a smash hit in Spain and later one of Mecano's most acclaimed songs. "Me Colé en Una Fiesta" was their third song to reach top ten and their first song to top the Spanish charts, where it stayed for one week. The song was also a commercial success, topping the Spanish Singles charts for six weeks in a row. It achieved platinum status for selling 100,000 units in the country.

The success of "Me Colé en Una Fiesta" also spread to Mecano's first single "Hoy No Me Puedo Levantar", owing to its promotion and radio airplay. Despite the success of "Me Colé en Una Fiesta", "Hoy No Me Puedo Levantar" didn't make it to number one, instead reaching number two. This success lead Mecano to become the best selling group in singles and convinced record companies to record their first studio album.

A music video of the Spanish version of the song was also released to promote the single. However it isn't included in the Mecano's official videography because of the group disliking the video and the low quality it has compared to the rest of their music videos.

Because of the success of the song in Spain, an English language version named "The Uninvited Guest" was released in some European music markets as in Netherlands, United Kingdom and Italy as a check from the discography Discos CBS to get to know Mecano internationally but despite the success the song received in Spain, the English version did not succeed in Europe and later this version of the song become a rarity.

In popular culture, the song is well known for its catch line "Coca-Cola para todos y algo de comer" ("Coca-Cola for everyone and something to eat"), the line which is often used to refer to the song.

== Background and composition ==
Inspired by a party propelled by "La movida Madrileña" on which Mecano snuck into when they weren't so known. It was written by member Ignacio Cano who wrote all tracks from Mecano (1982) but "Hoy No Me Puedo Levantar" who was written by his brother José Cano. The track was produced by his brother José Cano and the Argentinean producer Jorge Álvarez.

The single's B side “Boda en Londres” (“Wedding in London”) was chosen to be released as the B side of the single in honor of Lady Diana, Prince of Wales and his majesty the King Charles III's wedding the year before. On the European market rarity the track was named as just “London”.

== Formats ==
7 inch 1982 Spanish release

No.	Title	Length
1.	"Me Colé en Una Fiesta"	4:14
2.	"Boda en Londres"	3:22

7 inch 1983 Europe release

No.	Title	Length
1.	"The Uninvited Guest"	4:14
2.	"London"	3:22

== Charts ==
Chart performance for "Me Colé en Una Fiesta" (1982)
Country	Chart	Peak Pos.	Ref.
Spain	Los40 Principales	1	
