= Bailando por un Sueño (Mexican TV series) =

- Created by: Televisa
- Starring: Adal Ramones; Liza Echeverría
- Country of origin: Mexico

Original release
- Network: Las Estrellas; Univision
- Release: 2005

Bailando por un Sueño ("Dancing for a dream") is a reality series on the Mexican television network Canal de las Estrellas, in which many famous Latin American actors and actresses and celebrities are partnered with common, everyday people who have a dream they want to fulfill with the help of this program. Each week, the pairs of contestants compete against each other to impress a panel of judges. After each show, the two couples who receive the lowest scores compete against each other to avoid being eliminated from the competition. It is based on the British reality TV competition Strictly Come Dancing and is part of the Dancing with the Stars franchise. Through a telephone poll, viewers can also contribute to the success of the dancers. The votes of the viewers are combined with the panel's scores to decide on the ranking of the dancers. The process continues until there are only two couples standing. Rather than the promise of a large cash prize, the winner gets a previously stated wish granted. The show is also broadcast in the US on Univision.

== On Air ==
=== Hosts ===
- Adal Ramones Bailando Por Un Sueño(1-2); Show de Los Sueños (1-2)
- Liza Echeverría Bailando Por Un Sueño(1-2)
- Alessandra Rosaldo Bailando Por la Boda de Mis Suenos
- Monica Sanchez Bailando Por la boda de mis suenos (first 4 weeks)
- Marco Antonio Regil Bailando Por la Boda de Mis Suenos
- Paty Manterola Show de los Suenos

=== Dance Judges ===
- Edith González (1-3)
- Roberto Mitzuko(1-3,5)
- Emma Pulido (All)
- Felix Greco (1-3,5)
- Bibi Gaytán (4-5)

=== Singing Judges (El Show de Los Sueños) ===
- Fato All
- Amanda Miguel All
- Lupita D'Lessio (4)
- Kiko Campos All

== Contestants ==
=== Season 1 ===
- Latin Lover, actor/luchador (partnered with Mariana Vallejo) - Winners
- Adrián Uribe, actor/comedian (partnered with Bethzy Zamorano) - Runners-up
- Ana Layevska, actress (partnered with Juan Muñiz) - Eliminated - Eliminated 6th (Day 49)
- Patricia Navidad, actress/singer (partnered with Víctor Rivera) - Eliminated 5th (Day 42)
- Carlos Bonavides, actor/comedian (partnered with Athalía Giménez) - Eliminated 4th (Day 35)
- Cynthia Klitbo, actress (partnered with Fernando Rodríguez) - Eliminated 3rd (Day 28)
- María Rojo, actress/politician (partnered with Carlos Pastrana) - Eliminated 2nd (Day 21)
- René Casados, actor (partnered with Indira Domínguez) - Eliminated 1st ( Day 13)

== Contestants Cycle 2 ==
=== Season 2 ===
- Alessandra Rosaldo, actress/singer (partnered with Israel Aquino) - Winners
- Imanol Landeta, actor/singer (partnered with Cinthya Díaz) - Runners-up
- Adriana Fonseca, actress (partnered with Luis Colorado) - Eliminated 8th (Day 63))
- Galilea Montijo, actress/TV hostess (partnered with Miguel Ángel Monfort) - Eliminated 7th (Day 56)
- Gabriel Soto, actor/model (partnered with Pamela Marrun) - Eliminated 6th (Day 49)
- Sylvia Pasquel, actress (partnered with Óscar Ramírez) - Eliminated 5th (Day 42)
- Pilar Montenegro, actress/singer (partnered with Alfredo Ramírez) - Eliminated 4th (Day 35)
- Enrique "Perro" Bermudez, sports commentator (partnered with Yesenia Hernández) - Eliminated 3rd (Day 28)
- Jorge "Travieso" Arce, boxer (partnered with Verónica Carrillo) - Eliminated 2nd (Day 21)
- Sergio Mayer, actor (partnered with Jennifer Barcelata) - Eliminated 1st (Day 13)

== Reyes de la Pista "Kings of the (Dance) Floor"' ==
Challenge between the top 3 couples from the first and second seasons.

- Latin Lover, actor/wrestler (partnered with Mariana Vallejo) - Winners
- Adrián Uribe, actor/comedian (partnered with Bethzy Zamorano) - Runners-up
- Adriana Fonseca, actress (partnered with Luis Colorado) - Eliminated 3rd (3rd place)
- Alessandra Rosaldo, actress/singer (partnered with Israel Aquino) - Eliminated 2nd (4th place)
- Imanol Landeta, actor/singer (partnered with Cinthya Díaz) - Withdraw for an injury (5th place
- Ana Layevska, actress (partnered with Juan Muñiz) - Eliminated 1st (6th place)

== El Show de los sueño: Sangre de Mi Sangre ==
Season 1

- Pee Wee, singer (partnered with "Las Fuentes"- Winners
- Gloria Trevi, singer (partnered with Mario Alberto and Amadita "Los Arredondo")- Runner-up'
- Kalimba, singer (partnered with Francisco and Natali "Los Olvera" ) - Eliminated - Eliminated 6th (3rd place)
- María José, singer (partnered with Noé and Thalía "Los Vargas") - Eliminated 5th (4th place)
- José Manuel Figueroa, singer (partnered with Beatriz and Andrea "Las Franco") - Eliminated 4th (5th place)
- Edith Marquez, actress/singer (partnered with Saúl and Edgar "Los Alvidrez") - Eliminated 3rd (6th place)
- Ernesto D’lessio, actor/singer (partnered with Ana Karen and Mayra "Las Anaya") - Eliminated 2nd (7th place)
- Ilse, singer (partnered with Hugo and Penelope "Los Camacho") - Eliminated 1st (8th place)

== El Show de los sueños: Amigos del Alma ==
Season 2

- Priscila, singer (partnered with Irvin and Carlos "Los Chucitos") - Winners
- Nigga/Flex, singer (partnered with Kassandra and Ana "Las Acereras") - Runners-up
- Alan Estrada, actor and singer (partnered with "Luca and Jorge") - Eliminated 7th (3rd place)
- Sheila, actress and singer (partnered with Rubén and Sergio"Los Troyanos") - Eliminated 6th (4th place)
- Ninel Conde, actress and singer (partnered with Nancy and Alejandro "Los Elegidos")- Eliminated 5th (5th place)
- Mariana Seoane, actress and singer (partnered with Karen and Óscar "Los Cuaresmeños") - Eliminated 4th (6th place)
- José Manuel Zamacona e Hijo, singer (partnered with Beatriz and Ishla "Las Pinkys") - Eliminated 3rd (7th place)
- Iskander, singer (partnered with Claudia and Carmen "Las Peques") - Eliminated 2nd (8th place)
- Rodrigo Fernández, singer (partnered with Mayte y Angelo "Los Cazasonrisas") - Eliminated 1st (9th place)

== Reyes del Show ==
- Pee Wee, singer (partnered with Adriana and Susana "Las Fuentes") Winners of 1 Million Dollars
- Gloria Trevi, singer (partnered with Mario Alberto and Amadita "Los Arredondo") Runners-up
- Kalimba, singer (partnered with Francisco and Natali "Los Olvera" )Eliminated 4th (3rd place)
- Priscila, singer (partnered with Irvin and Carlos "Los Chucitos")Eliminated 3rd (4th place)
- Alan Estrada, actor and singer (partnered with "Luca and Jorge")Eliminated 2nd (5th place)
- Nigga/Flex, singer (partnered with Kassandra and Ana "Las Acereras")Eliminated 1st (6th place)

Season 1

- Pee Wee, singer (partnered with Adriana and Susana "Las Fuentes") - Winners
- Gloria Trevi, singer (partnered with Mario Alberto and Amadita "Los Arredondo") - Runners-up
- Kalimba, singer (partnered with Francisco and Natali "Los Olvera" ) - Eliminated - (3rd place)

Season 2

- Priscila, singer (partnered with Irvin and Carlos "Los Chucitos") - Winners
- Nigga/Flex, singer (partnered with Kassandra and Ana "Las Acereras") - Runners-up
- Alan Estrada, actor and singer (partnered with "Luca and Jorge") - (3rd place)

== Bailando por México ==
After the success of Bailando por un sueño a side show called Bailando por México was prepared on the same year. The contestants were:

- Elizabeth Álvarez, actress
- Anaís, actress (partnered with Benjamín)
- Omar Chaparro, TV presenter (partnered with Luz María Herrera)
- Ernesto D’Alessio, actor/singer
- Luz Elena González, actress (partnered with (Juan Manuel)
- Rafael Inclán, actor
- Manuel Landeta, actor (partnered with Alma Delia)
- Charly López, ex-member of Garibaldi (partnered with Grettel Valdez)
- Ingrid Martz, actress
- Ana Patricia Rojo, actress (partnered with Rommel Treviño)

Cantando Y bailando Por Un Sueno De Navidad This was a one episode show featuring six contestants (both of them famous) to accomplish a dream to save a small town.

Judges:

- Ema Pulido, Judge from Bailando Por un Sueno, Reyes de la Pista, and Bailando por la Boda de mis Suenos
- Roberto Mitzuko, Judge from Bailando Por un Sueno, Reyes de la Pista, and Bailando por la Boda de mis Suenos
- Ricardo Montaner, Judge from Cantando por un Sueno and Reyes de la Cancion
- José José, Singer

Contestants:

- Kika Edgar (Cantando por un Sueno contestant) and Diego Vrdaguer, Singer---Winners
- Rocio Banquells (Winner of the third season of Cantando Por Un Sueno) and Mauricio Martinez, 2nd place
- Raquel Bigorra (Winner of the second season of Cntando Por Un Sueno) and Napoleon, Singer, 3rd place
- Emir Pabon (Bailando Por La Boda De Mis Suenos contestant) and Arianna, Singer, 4th place
- Eduardo Capetillo (Singer and Actor) and Dulce, singer, 5th place
- Maya Karuna (Cantando Por Un Seuno contestant) and Sergi Fchelli, actor, 6th place

== See also ==
- Dancing with the Stars
- Cantando por un Sueño
- Bailando por un Sueño (Argentina)
- Bailando por un Sueño (Peru)
