= Ya viene el Sol =

Studio album by Mecano
- Released: 16 October 1984
- Studio: AudioFilm (Madrid); Lillye Yard (London); Nova (London); Snake Ranch (London)
- Genre: Synth-pop; dream pop
- Length: 41:31
- Label: CBS Discos
- Producer: Mecano

Mecano chronology
¿Dónde está el país de las hadas? (1983)	Ya viene el Sol (1984)	Entre el cielo y el suelo (1986)

Singles from Ya viene el Sol
- 1. "Japón" Released: 28 May 1984; 2. "Busco algo barato" Released: 8 October 1984; 3. "No pintamos nada" Released: 10 December 1984; 4. "Hawaii-Bombay" Released: 8 April 1985

Ya viene el Sol (The Sun Is Coming) is the third studio album by the Spanish synth-pop band Mecano, released on 16 October 1984 by CBS Discos. The album was the beginning of a more sophisticated and mature sound. It included new sounds in the band's music, utilising the Fairlight CMI, a digital sampling synthesiser. After this album, the band assumed the production of their records from the start. This album includes the only song that the band's lead vocalist Ana Torroja wrote with the band ("Mosquito"). The importance of the songs written by José María Cano and the fact that, for the first time, one of his songs was released as a single – and became the biggest hit of the summer – kept the band together, since at this point he was considering leaving the band.

== About the singles ==
The first single was "Japón" (Japan). It was composed by Nacho Cano and was very modern for its time. The use of the Fairlight CMI on the production of the track included the use of percussion and industrial sounds. The theme of the song is the hyper-industrialization of Japan and its life.

The second single was "Busco Algo Barato" ("Looking for Something Cheap"), also composed by Nacho Cano. The B-side for this song later became one of the most important songs by Mecano and of the Rock en tu idioma (Rock in Your Own Language) movement: "Aire". "Aire" ("Air") written by José María, originally was proposed as a single but CBS declined the proposal. This did not stop the song from becoming a single in South America. The song was edited and released as a single in Venezuela and Colombia. This song helped the band become recognized as a mature band that could do more profound songs.

The third single was the album's opening track, "No pintamos nada" (We Don't Count for Anything), a synth-pop sound composed by Nacho Cano. The song is based on the Cold War and the lack of voice and vote of the common people when they try to cast an opinion about global politics. The B-side was a non-album track called "La Extraña Posición" (The Strange Position). It narrates the story of a love triangle that ends in a crime of passion.

The fourth and final single was "Hawaii-Bombay". It was the first A-side song composed by José Cano to be released. The B-side was "El mapa de tu corazón" ("The Map of Your Heart"). "Hawaii-Bombay" was selected in Spain as the hit of the summer, for the tremendous success it had on all the radio stations in the country. It was recorded seven years later in English but was never released due to the band's hiatus.

The fifth single was "Ya viene el sol" ("Here Comes the Sun"). It was a non-official single release in Mexico and the rest of Latin America which had a moderate success.

The track "Me non parlez vous français" (bastardized French: "Me non parlez vous Français" -> "Mais non parlez vous Français" -> "Just Don't Speak French") was recorded as a demo for the album but was discarded later in the recording session; it subsequently became "Abracadabra", a song performed by the Spanish singer Alaska used as soundtrack for the television show La Bola de Cristal (The Crystal Ball).

== Track listing ==
1. "No pintamos nada" (Nacho Cano) – 3:50
2. "Ya viene el Sol" (Nacho Cano) – 4:42
3. "La estación" (Nacho Cano) – 4:15
4. "Hawaii-Bombay" (José María Cano) – 4:10
5. "Mosquito" (Nacho Cano, Ana Torroja) – 4:22
6. "Busco algo barato" (Nacho Cano) – 3:22
7. "Aire" (José María Cano) – 4:32
8. "Me río de Janeiro" (José María Cano) – 4:02
9. "Japón" (Nacho Cano) – 4:06
10. "El mapa de tu corazón" (Nacho Cano) – 4:08
11. "Hawaii-Bombay" (remix) (José María Cano) – 4:28 Bonus track on 2005 edition
- Bonus Tracks included on the B-side of some vinyl singles and maxi-singles
1. "Japón/La estación" (single, 28 May 1984)
2. "Japón" (promo single, 28 May 1984)
3. "Let's dance Japón" (disco-mix) / Japón (album version) / La estación (maxi-single, 28 May 1984)
4. "Busco algo barato" / "Aire" (single, 8 October 1984)
5. "No pintamos nada" (album version) / "La extraña posición" (single, 10 December 1984)
6. "No pintamos nada" (nueva versión industrial) / "La extraña posición" (versión disco-mix) (maxi-single, 12 December 1984)
7. "Hawaii-Bombay" / "El mapa de tu corazón" (single, 8 April 1985)
8. "Hawaii-Bombay" (censored version – Chile edition) (promo 8 April 1985)
9. "Hawaii-Bombay" (maxi version) / "Hawaii-Bombay" (album version) / "El mapa de tu corazón" (maxi-single, 17 June 1985)

== Charts ==
#	Chart	Peak position	Date
1.	Spain Albums Chart (2nd Edition)	99	6 June 2005

== Certifications and sales ==
Region	Certification	Certified units/sales
Spain (Promusicae)	Gold	50,000^{^}
^{^} Shipments figures based on certification alone.
