= Luis Cobos =

Spanish composer, conductor and musician

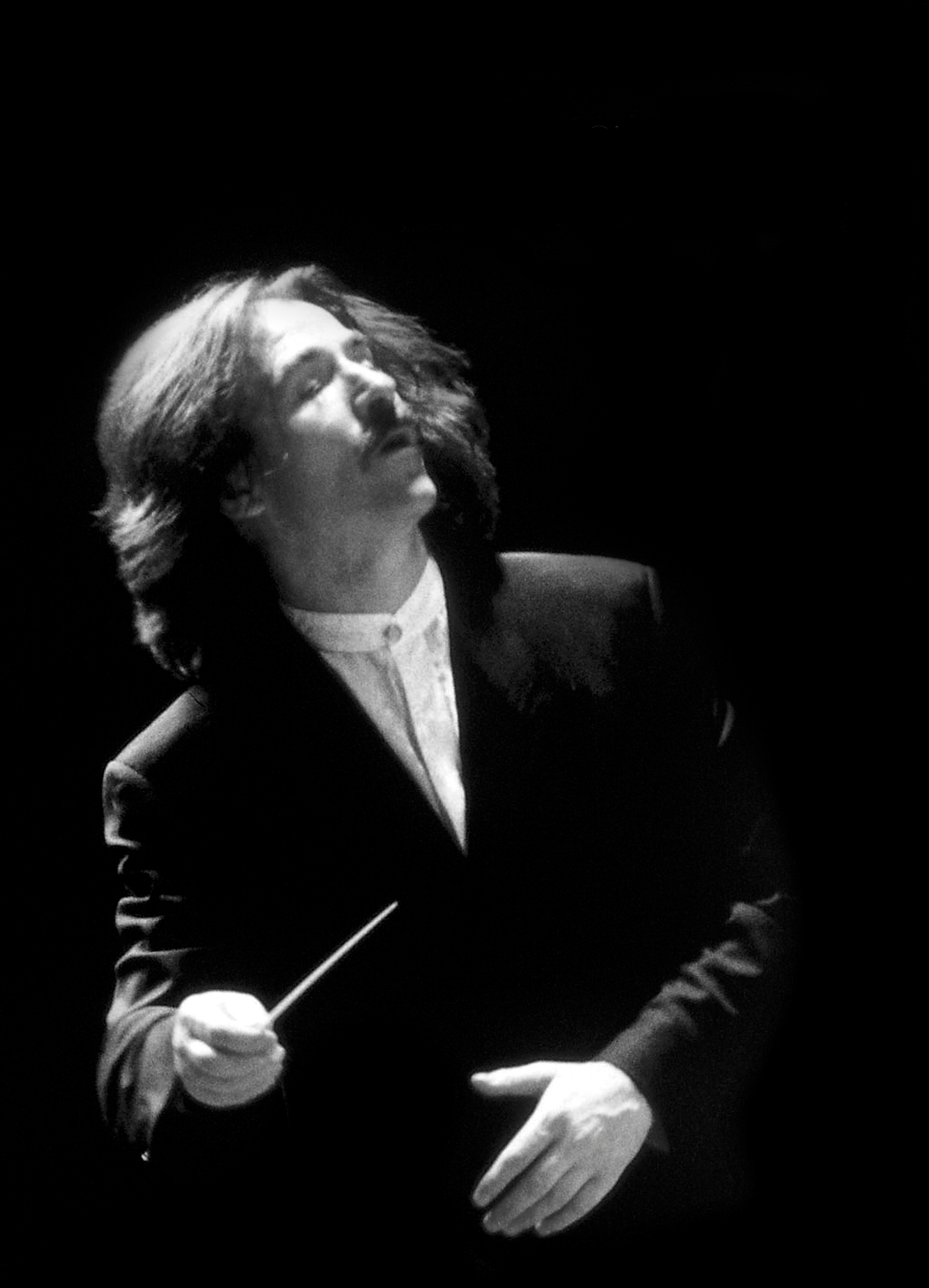
- Luis Cobos in Japan.

Background information
- Born: 30 October 1948 (age 77); Campo de Criptana, Castilla-La Mancha, Spain
- Genres: Classical
- Occupations: Musician, conductor, composer, record producer
- Years active: 1982–present
- Labels: Sony, Universal
- Website: www.luiscobos.com

Luis Cobos (born October 30, 1948) is a Spanish composer, conductor and musician. He is chairman of the management entity performers (AIE) and the chairman of the board of the Latin Academy of Recording Arts & Sciences. He was married to the singer Angel.

== Career ==
Cobos initially began as an arranger and composer for a Los Angeles latin-soul aggregation called 'Conexión' who released a number of popular dance cuts and one album including "I will pray" from the late 1960s to the early 1970s. In addition Cobos and his orchestra The Philharmonic Beethoven contributed further arrangements on a variety of latin releases during the 1970s.

Cobos' big break came in 1982 when he recorded his first solo studio album Zarzuela at Abbey Road Studios with the Royal Philharmonic Orchestra. Following the release of Zarzuela, Cobos released his second studio album in 1983 Sol y sombra followed by Mexicano which was released in 1984. He also collaborated with the albums Mecano and ¿Dónde está el país de las hadas?. His following singles reached the top of the charts: "Capriccio russo" (1986), "Tempo d'Italia" (1987) and "Vienna Concerto" (1989). In addition, his music reached the charts in the United Kingdom, France, Finland, Belgium, Germany, Argentina and Portugal. His 1990 album, Opera Extravaganza reached number 72 in the UK Albums Chart, whilst his single release, "Nessun Dorma from 'Turandot'" (featuring Plácido Domingo), peaked at number 59 in the UK Singles Chart later the same year.

As a conductor Cobos conducted national orchestras which included the RAI National Symphony Orchestra, RTVE Symphony Orchestra and the Vienna Symphony. He also collaborated with various singers including Plácido Domingo, José Carreras, Julio Iglesias, Ana Belén, Isabel Pantoja, Mónica Naranjo and Joaquín Sabina.

In 1998, Cobos published his biography, La danza de los corceles (The Dance of the Horses).

== Discography ==
- Zarzuela (1982)
- Sol y sombra (1983)
- Mexicano (1984)
- Más Zarzuela (1985)
- La corte de Faraón (complete zarzuela) (1985)
- Capriccio ruso (1986)
- Olympus (1986)
- Tempo d'Italia (1987)
- Vienna Concerto (1988)
- Opera Magna (1989)
- Suite 1700 (1990)
- Opera Extravaganza (1990)
- Concerto Fantastico (1991)
- Viento del Sur (1993)
- Oscars (1994)
- Best (1995)
- Amor (1997)
- La danza de los corceles (1998)
- ¡Viva México! (2000)
- Encantados (2008)
