= Alan Estrada =

Mexican actor, dancer & singer

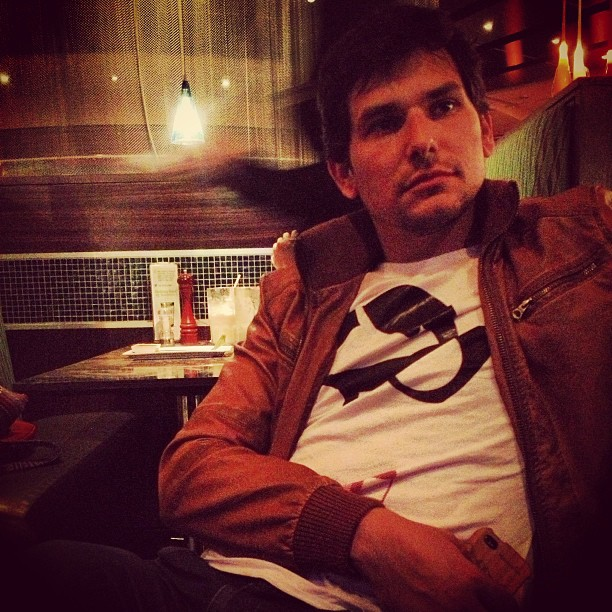
- Estrada in 2013
- Born: Alan Estrada Gutiérrez; December 23, 1980 (age 45); Tepatitlán de Morelos, Jalisco, Mexico
- Other name: Alan x el Mundo
- Occupations: Actor and singer and travel blogger
- Website: alanxelmundo.com

Alan Estrada Gutiérrez (born December 23, 1980, in Tepatitlán de Morelos, Jalisco, Mexico) is a Mexican actor, dancer and singer. His best known role was "Mario" in the Spanish musical Hoy No Me Puedo Levantar. He is also known for his YouTube channel Alan X El Mundo, documenting his world travels.

== Career ==
At the age of 18, he went to Mexico City to begin his artistic training. His professional debut was in 2000 in the play Oedipus at Colonus starring Ignacio Lopez Tarso. After that, he participated in several revivals as Chicago the musical, Saturday Night Fever and Joseph and the Amazing Technicolor Dreamcoat (all Mexican productions). His first television appearance was a minor role as "Claudio" in the soap opera Clap in 2003. He also acted in the low-budget film Hotel Garage, the tape has never been released.

In 2006, he was cast by Nacho Cano as "Mario" starring the Mexican production of the musical Hoy No Me Puedo Levantar, based on the Spanish music group Mecano. He played more than 400 performances at the Teatro 1 del Centro Cultural Telmex and later in Hoy No Me Puedo Levantar. El Concierto a version of the musical adapted for a tour that opened at the Auditorio Nacional in Mexico City. By the same time, he made a special appearance in the Univision’s soap opera Lola...Érase una vez as "Nicolas". He also starred two short films Dejalo Así and Tabacotla. The Mexican magazine Quien listed him as one of the sexiest men in 2007.

In 2008, followed by the success in Mexico, the Spanish production of Hoy No Me Puedo Levantar invited him to close the season of the musical in Madrid, Spain and started the tour of the Iberian country. The same year he has three Mexican movies in theaters: a brief appearance in Casi Divas (Road to Fame), followed by the romantic comedy Amor Letra Por Letra starring with Silvia Navarro, and the parody Divina Confusion of Salvador Garcini, also starred by Jesus Ochoa, Diana Bracho, Pedro Armendáriz, Luis Roberto Guzman, Lisa Owen, Adal Ramones, Kalimba and Ana Brenda Contreras. While he was in México promoting his films received the proposal to work for television in Bailando por un Sueño so decided to leave the musical in Spain.

Alan began his participation in the second season of Televisa’s reality: El Show De Los Sueños, Amigos Del Alma. His team “Los Mosqueteros” reached the final: Los Reyes Del Show, they did not win the contest, but it gave him the opportunity to get to an international audience showing his talent in singing and dancing. He had a role in the second season of the Mexican soap opera Verano de amor as "Fabian Escudero" and appeared in the Mexican musical Que planton! as "El Pino".

He currently co-stars in the Mexican soap opera Amor Bravío and is a co-host of the morning talk show "Hoy" which airs in the United States on Univision. He also hosts an online travelling show called "Alan x el Mundo".

In 2020, he participated in the second season of ¿Quién es la máscara? as the Jalapeño.

=== Theatre ===
Year	Title	Role
2000	Oedipus at Colonus	
2001	Chicago the musical	Swing
2003	Saturday Night Fever	Joey, Tony Manero
2005	Archi	
2006	Hoy No Me Puedo Levantar	Mario
2009	¡Que Planton!	Pinetree
2010	Timbiriche el Musical	Roberto
2012	I Love Romeo Y Julieta	Romeo
2012	Despertando en Primavera	Melchior
2014	Hoy No Me Puedo Levantar	Mario

=== Film ===
Year	Title	Role	Other notes
2005	Hotel Garage	Antonio	
2007	Dejalo Así	Andrés	Short film
2007	Tabacotla	Sebastian	Short film
2008	Road to Fame	Santiago	
2008	Amor Letra Por Letra	Edgar	
2008	Divina Confusión	Pablo	
2011	Lluvia de Luna	Pablo	
2019	This Is Tomas	Christopher	
2023	La Usurpadora: The Musical	Carlos Daniel	

== Alan x El Mundo ==
The idea emerged when he visited Asia, India, Thailand and Cambodia. While he was doing his artistic career, he visited China and soon Japan, which was how Alan x El Mundo emerged. After the death of his mom, he traveled to Morocco, England and Iceland. After traveling to the Czech Republic, he gained fame on YouTube. As of November 2020, the channel had 2.66 million subscribers.

=== Places ===
He visited places around the world, including Disney Parks, the Set of Game of Thrones and the Memorial of the Mauthausen concentration camp in Austria. He also went to the opening of Pandora – The World of Avatar at Disney's Animal Kingdom

== Personal life ==
Estrada is gay.
