= Amante =

Amante or Amantes may refer to:

== People with the name ==
=== Surname ===
- Edelmiro Amante (1933–2013), Filipino politician
- Ferdinand M. Amante, Jr. (born 1961), Filipino politician
- Vicente Amante (born 1948), Filipino politician

=== Fictional ===
- Amante del Valle, a character in the Philippine drama series Mara Clara (1992 TV series) and Mara Clara (2010 TV series)

== Books ==
- Los Amantes, 1968 play with Amelia Bence
- Los Amantes, poetry collection by Arturo Corcuera 1976

== Film and TV ==
- Amantes (film), 1991 Spanish film noir written and directed by Vicente Aranda
- Amantes (TV series), telenovela

== Music ==
- "El Amante", song by Nicky Jam
- El Amante, 1981 album by Sunny & the Sunliners
- Los Amantes (song), a 1988 song by Mecano

== Other uses ==
- Los Amantes, a painting by René Magritte
- Amantes (tribe), an ancient tribe in modern southern Albania
