= Conexión (Ana Torroja album) =

Live album by Ana Torroja
- Released: May 5, 2015
- Recorded: December 3, 2014
- Studio: Estudios Churubusco, Mexico
- Genre: Latin; Pop
- Length: 62:56
- Language: Spanish
- Label: OCESA Seitrack
- Producer: Áureo Baqueiro

Ana Torroja chronology
Sonrisa (2015)	Conexión (2015)

Singles from Conexión
- 1. "Disculpa" Released: February 16, 2015; 2. "Barco a Venus" Released: June 6, 2015; 3. "Un Año Más" Released: October, 2015

Conexión is the second live album by Spanish singer Ana Torroja. It was released under the label OCESA Seitrack on May 5, 2015. The album was recorded in Ciudad de México on December 3, 2014. The album includes material from her past five studio albums as well as 4 newly recorded songs. Featured guest include Paty Cantú, Leonel García, Miguel Bosé, Aleks Syntek, Carla Morrison and Ximena Sariñana.

== Background ==
The album was recorded in front of a selected audience attending a concert located in Mexico City.

== Singles ==
Of this material three singles were released: "Disculpa"; launched on February 16, 2015, "Barco a Venus"; launched on June 6, 2015 and "Un Año Más"; launched in October, 2015.

== Track listing ==
Conexión
No.	Title	Writer(s)	Length
1.	"La fuerza del destino"	Nacho Cano	5:57
2.	"Hoy no me puedo levantar"	N. Cano	3:26
3.	"A contratiempo"	Ana Torroja / B. Hayes / N. Yustas	4:07
4.	"Disculpa"	Aureo Baqueiro / Paty Cantú	3:58
5.	"50 palabras, 60 palabras ó 100" (with Sasha, Benny and Erik)	N. Cano	3:57
6.	"A tus pies"	Ashley Grace / Hanna Nicole / Pablo Preciado	3:15
7.	"Maquillaje"	N. Cano	2:55
8.	"Mujer contra mujer" (with Paty Cantú)	José María Cano	4:46
9.	"Infiel"	Ángela Dávalos / Baqueiro / Cantú	4:10
10.	"Me cuesta tanto olvidarte" (with Leonel García)	J. Cano	3:40
11.	"El 7 de septiembre" (with Miguel Bosé)	N. Cano	3:59
12.	"Quiero llorar"	Dávalos / Cantú	3:45
13.	"Duele el amor" (with Aleks Syntek)	Aleks Syntek	4:28
14.	"Un año más" (with Carla Morrison y Ximena Sariñana)	N. Cano	4:47
15.	"Corazones"	Torroja / Miguel Bosé	4:01
16.	"Barco a Venus"	N. Cano	4:05
Total length:			62:56

Conexión — Deluxe edition
No.	Title	Length
1.	"Sonrisa"
2.	"Los amantes"
3.	"Cruz de navajas"
4.	"Ya no te quiero"
5.	"Aire"
6.	"No me canso"
7.	"Como suenan las sirenas"
8.	"El 7 de septiembre" (with Carlos Rivera)

== Certifications ==
Region	Certification	Certified units/sales
Mexico (AMPROFON)	Platinum	60,000^{‡}
^{‡} Sales+streaming figures based on certification alone.
