= Malinche (musical) =

2022 musical created by Nacho Cano

Malinche, un musical de Nacho Cano (or Malinche) is a Spanish-language stage musical, based on the life of the Nahuan slave known as La Malinche. It premiered at the IFEMA Fairground in Madrid in 2022, and will be produced in Mexico featuring a Mexican cast. An English-language production has also been performed by the Madrid cast.

== Musical numbers ==
- Hijos de la espada ("Children of the Sword"))
- México mágico (Magical Mexico)

== Critical response ==
El País's Raquel Vidales praised the show's music, singers, set design and dancers, but was not complimentary of the script. ElDebate.com's Maria Serrano described the songlist as "boring".

Cinemagavia.es's review concluded that the show was a technical, if not an artistic success.

== Documentary ==
A Netflix documentary, "Making Malinche: A Documentary by Nacho Cano", on the development of the show was produced in 2021. The documentary provides "behind-the-scenes" insights into the production and development of the show "Malinche", which was created by Nacho Cano.

== Controversy ==
In July 2024 the director of the play, Nacho Cano, was arrested for allegedly hiring irregular migrants for the musical 'Malinche'.The musician subsequently held a press conference in which he accused the police of being criminals. The Spanish railway company Renfe cancelled the agreement with Malinche the following day because of possible reputational damage as a result of these statements. In its statement, Renfe referred to the "alleged violation of workers' rights".
