= Out of the Ashes (Katra album) =

2010 studio album by Katra

Studio album by Katra
- Released: October 26, 2010
- Recorded: 2010
- Genre: Symphonic metal
- Length: 44:30
- Label: Napalm Records
- Producer: Katra

Katra chronology
Beast Within	Out of the Ashes

Out of the Ashes is the third studio album by the Finnish symphonic metal band Katra, released on October 26, 2010.

== Track listing ==
1. Delirium - 3:31
2. One Wish Away - 4:09
3. If There Is No Tomorrow - 4:27
4. Vendetta - 4:29
5. Out of the Ashes - 4:20
6. Envy - 4:15
7. Mirror - 4:20
8. Anthem - 4:48
9. The End of the Scene - 4:32
10. Hide and Seek - 5:40

Total length: 44:30
