= Ángel (Spanish singer) =

Spanish singer

Angelika Fischer is a model who became popular as the singer Ángel in Spain in the late 1980s. She had hits with "Dancing In Paris (Que Pasa)" and "Touch my heart". For a time she was married to her producer Luis Cobos.
