= Aidalai =

Studio album by Mecano
- Released: June 1991 (Spain)
- Genre: Pop
- Length: 56:02
- Label: Ariola Eurodisc S.A.
- Producer: Mecano

Mecano chronology
Descanso Dominical (1988)	Aidalai (1991)	Ana José Nacho (1998)

Singles from Aidalai
- 1. "El 7 de septiembre" Released: 27 May 1991; 2. "El peón del rey de negras" Released: 15 August 1991; 3. "Naturaleza muerta" Released: 16 October 1991; 4. "Dalai Lama" Released: 9 December 1991; 5. "Una rosa es una rosa" Released: 12 May 1992; 6. "El fallo positivo" Released: July 1992; 7. "Tú" Released: 27 October 1992; 8. "Bailando salsa" Released: 18 January 1993

Aidalai is an album by pop group Mecano. It was released in 1991 and produced by the group. Its launch was in the middle of rumours of the separation of the group due to differences between Nacho Cano and José María Cano. It was their third release with Ariola Records. The title is a play on words: Aidalai → ¡Ay Dalai!, meaning in English something like Oh Dalai!.

== Spain Edition ==
Aidalai songs range from very minimalist ones like "Sentía" (I felt), a kind of bossa nova music in which the voice of singer Ana Torroja is accompanied by only two acoustic guitars and maracas, to others as complex as "Naturaleza muerta" (Still Life), which has a complex orchestral string arrangement. However, also on the album are songs typical of the group's techno pop style, like "El fallo positivo" (The positive verdict) about the issue of AIDS, with perhaps one of the best works of vocal arrangements of Nacho Cano, and "Dalai Lama", that narrates the life of the Dalai Lama and the invasion of Tibet by China.

It also includes "El 7 de septiembre" (September 7th), written by Nacho Cano, which won best song of the year in Spain in 1991 and was dedicated to his ex-girlfriend, the writer Coloma Fernández Armero. "Tú" (You), a heartfelt song by José María Cano, is also included.

José María Cano's song "Una rosa es una rosa" (A rose is a rose) was inspired by the famous sentences of the writer Gertrude Stein: Rose is a rose is a rose is a rose and the video won in the category of "Best National Video of the Year" in the Ondas Awards and the Lo Nuestro Award for Video of the Year.

== Track listing ==
Tracks:

1. "El fallo positivo" (I. Cano) – 4:00
2. "El uno, el dos, el tres" (J.M. Cano) – 4:41
3. "Bailando salsa" (J.M. Cano) – 4:08
4. "El 7 de septiembre" (I. Cano) – 5:02
5. "Naturaleza muerta" (J.M. Cano) – 5:02
6. "1917 (Instrumental)" (I. Cano) – 4:12
7. "Una rosa es una rosa" (J.M. Cano) – 4:48
8. "El lago artificial" (I. Cano) – 3:53
9. "Tú" (J.M. Cano) – 4:10
10. "Dalai Lama" (I. Cano) – 5:29
11. "El peón del rey de negras" (J.M. Cano) – 4:49
12. "J.C." (I. Cano) – 4:20
13. "Sentía" (J.M Cano) – 3:28
14. "El 7 de septiembre (Acoustic version)" (I. Cano) – 4:36 (only on the 2005 edition)

== Italy Edition ==
This edition was released simultaneously with the Spain and France editions. It has a length of 56:02 min; it includes 6 tracks in Italian and the rest in Spanish. The adaptations were made by B. Bonezzi and M. Luberti.

=== Track listing ===
Tracks:

1. "Responso positivo (El fallo positivo)" – 4:00
2. "El uno, el dos, el tres" – 4:41
3. "Bailando salsa" – 4:08
4. "Il 7 di settembre (El 7 de septiembre)" – 5:02
5. "Anna e Miguel (Naturaleza muerta)" – 5:02
6. "1917 (Instrumental)" – 4:12
7. "Una rosa è una rosa (Una rosa es una rosa)" – 4:48
8. "El lago artificial" – 3:53
9. "Tu (Tú)" – 4:10
10. "Dalai Lama (Italian Version)" – 5:29
11. "El peón del rey de negras" – 4:49
12. "J.C." – 4:20
13. "Sentía" – 3:28

=== Singles ===
- Tu/Tú (1991)

== France Edition ==
This French edition was released simultaneously with the Spain and Italy editions. It has a length of 60:22 min. It includes 7 songs in French, 6 in Spanish and an instrumental one. This edition was published by BMG Musique in Quebec, Canada. Its adaptations were made by Luc Plamondon, D. Burgard, M. Penalva and A. Moreau.

=== Track listing ===
Tracks:

1. "Dis-moi lune d'argent (Hijo de la Luna)" – 4:20
2. "El fallo positivo" – 4:00
3. "Une histoire à trois (El uno, el dos, el tres)" – 4:41
4. "J.C. (French version)" – 4:20
5. "Bailando salsa" – 4:08
6. "Dalai Lama" – 5:29
7. "Toi (Tú)" – 4:10
8. "Le 7 septembre (El 7 de septiembre)" – 5:02
9. "Una rosa es una rosa" – 4:48
10. "Le paradis artificiel (El lago artificial)" – 3:53
11. "Nature morte (Naturaleza muerta)" – 5:02
12. "1917 (instrumental)" – 4:12
13. "El peón del rey de negras" – 4:49
14. "Sentía" – 3:28

=== Singles ===
- Dis-moi lune d'argent/Hijo de la Luna (1991)
- Nature morte/Naturaleza muerta (1991)
- Toi/Tú (1991)
- Dalai Lama/Le 7 Septembre (1991)

== Charts ==
=== Album charts ===
#	Chart	Peak position	Date
1.	"Spain Album Charts" (1991 Edition)	#1	June 10, 1991
2.	"Switzerland Chart" (France Edition)	#29	Nov 15, 1991
3.	"Spain Album Charts" (2nd Edition)	#32	Sep 11, 2005

=== Single charts ===
Date	Title	Chart positions												B-Sides
Date	Title	ESP	MEX	CRI	CHL	COL	NIC	ECU	VEN	ARG	NLD	FRA	ITA	B-Sides
27 May 1991	El 7 de septiembre	1	9	9	2	5	10	5	10	10	76	-	-	El 7 de septiembre (Acoustic Version)
16 October 1991	Naturaleza muerta	9	11	12	9	7	5	15	10	10	-	-	-	El peón del rey de negras
9 December 1991	Dalai Lama	1	1	1	2	2	1	1	2	2	-	-	-	Dalai Lama (Instrumental)
1991	Dis-moi lune d'argent	-	-	-	-	-	-	-	-	-	5	6	-	Hijo de la Luna
12 May 1992	Una rosa es una rosa	1	1	1	1	1	1	1	1	1	64	-	-	Una rosa es una rosa (Live)
1 August 1992	Un anno di più	-	-	-	-	-	-	-	-	-	-	-	32	Une femme avec une femme
September 1992	El fallo positivo	2	9	11	10	10	15	10	10	19	-	-	-	El fallo positivo (LP Version)
16 November 1, 1992	Tú	4	9	10	10	10	15	13	10	14	47	-	-	1917

== Certifications ==
Region	Certification	Certified units/sales
France (SNEP)	2× Gold	200,000^{*}
Spain (Promusicae)	10× Platinum	1,000,000^{^}
^{*} Sales figures based on certification alone.^{^} Shipments figures based on certification alone.

== See also ==
- List of best-selling albums in Spain
