= Greenpeace, Salvemos Al Mediterráneo =

Greenpeace Salvemos Al Mediterráneo

Compilation album by Various Artists
- Released: 1986 (Spain)
- Genre: Pop
- Length: 1:14:00
- Label: RCA Records; Ariola Records

Greenpeace, Salvemos al Mediterráneo (English: Let's save the Mediterranean Sea) is a compilation album by various singers with benefits to the non-governmental organization Greenpeace. It was released in 1986. It was edited only in Spain in LP format. The only unpublished song was the one by Mecano.

== Track listing ==
- Side A:
1. Mediterráneo (Joan Manuel Serrat) 3:58
2. A por el mar (Luis Eduardo Aute) 3:25
3. ¡Es la guerra! (Orquesta Mondragón) 3:22
4. Una décima de segundo (Nacha Pop) 3:20
5. El viento de África (Radio Futura) 3:30
6. La leyenda del tiempo (Camarón) 3:38
7. Entre dos aguas (Paco de Lucía) 6:03
8. Sin aire (Ramoncín) 3:50
- Side B:
1. Antinuclear (Miguel Ríos) 3:34
2. Pronto viviremos en la Luna (Víctor Manuel) 4:31
3. Planeta Agua (Ana Belén) 4:16
4. ¿Cómo pudiste hacerme esto a mi? (Alaska y Dinarama) 4:05
5. No te puedo besar (Hombres G) 3:43
6. Danza de la primavera (Maria del Mar Bonet) 3:14
7. Maremar (Lluís Llach) 6:48
8. Canción cortita para antes que nos abandone el mar (Mecano) 0:57
