= This Is Tomas =

- Spanish: ¿Conoces a Tomás?
- Directed by: María Torres
- Written by: Enrique Vázquez
- Starring: Hoze Meléndez; Leonardo Ortizgris; Marcela Guirado; Alan Estrada
- Cinematography: Carlos Hidalgo
- Edited by: Santiago Pérez Rocha León; Rodrigo Rodríguez
- Music by: Renato del Real
- Distributed by: Videocine Distribución
- Release date: 26 July 2019 (Mexico)
- Running time: 87 minutes
- Country: Mexico
- Language: Spanish

This Is Tomas (Spanish: ¿Conoces a Tomás?) is a 2019 Mexican comedy film directed by María Torres. The film stars Hoze Meléndez, Leonardo Ortizgris, Marcela Guirado, and Alan Estrada.

== Plot ==
Tomás (Hoze Meléndez), is a young man with autism who is taken unexpectedly by his brother-in-law (Leonardo Ortizgris), a versatile group musician, to a wedding. Along the way, Tomás will discover a world he did not know.

== Cast ==
- Hoze Meléndez as Tomás
- Leonardo Ortizgris as Leonardo
- Marcela Guirado as Fernanda
- Alan Estrada as Christopher
- Pamela Almanza as Yovanna
- María Evoli as Roxanna
- Martha Claudia Moreno as Doña Rosa
- Juan Pablo Medina as Don T
- Úrsula Pruneda as Pati
- Eligio Meléndez as Reparador
