= Katra (band) =

Finnish symphonic metal band

- Origin: Tampere, Finland
- Genres: Symphonic metal
- Years active: 2006–present
- Labels: Edel, Napalm
- Members: Katra Solopuro; Kristian Kangasniemi; Johannes Tolonen; Teemu Mätäsjärvi; Matti Auerkallio
- Past members: Jani Wilund; Tom "Tomma" Gardiner; Jaakko Järvensivu
- Website: http://www.katra.fi/

Katra is a Finnish symphonic metal band founded in 2005 by vocalist Katra Solopuro in Tampere, Finland. The band is known for combining classical female vocals with symphonic and gothic metal elements. After three albums between 2007 and 2010, the band went on hiatus before returning in 2023 with the single Ever After.

== Members ==
Katra Anniina Solopuro (born 10 August 1984, Tampere) is a Finnish singer, performer and producer. She studied musical theatre at from where she graduated as bachelor of music Tampere University of Applied Sciences and cultural management at HUMAK University of Applied Sciences.

Outside of KATRA, Solopuro has an international career as a multidisciplinary show artist specializing in fire performance, hooping, and LED art through her production company Lumina Productions. She has performed in over 35 countries at corporate events, festivals, galas and large-scale ceremonies.

She also appeared in theatre, most notably as Demeter in Cats at Tampereen Teatteri (2017–2018).

Other current members of Katra include guitarist Kristian Kangasniemi (Sonicmind), bassist Johannes Tolonen (Manzana, When the Empire Falls, Plain Fade, Alcoholica), drummer Matti Auerkallio (Avenie, Soulfallen, Duality, Animal House, Mistreaters and Four Hoarsemen), and guitarist Teemu Mätäsjärvi (Alcoholica).

== History ==
=== "Sahara" single (2006) and Katra (2007) ===
Solopuro released a single "Sahara" in September 2006. Then she formed the band Katra and published the self-titled album Katra through Edel Records in spring 2007. The "Sahara" single received much radio play and while on tour, the band started writing new material. Katra also released a single that included the songs "Tietäjä" and "Vaaratar".

=== Napalm Records signing and Beast Within (2008) ===
In November 2007 it was announced that Napalm Records signed Katra and asked for an international version of their 2007 album Katra. The band re-recorded the 2007 album Katra in English, along with two new songs and named the English language release Beast Within. The album was produced by Risto Asikainen (Stratovarius) at Jean Records Studio. Beast Within was published in late August/early September 2008. The band played a couple of gigs in Germany, including Summer Breeze Open Air 2009 and received a good response. Katra also released a video for the title track "Beast Within". On June 19, 2010, Katra opened for Theatre of Tragedy at Circo Volador in Mexico, a career highlight for all of the members.

=== Out of the Ashes (2010) ===
Out of the Ashes was released in October 2010 internationally through Napalm Records and in Finland through Bullhead Music. Although it is their third album, Katra considers it their first creation as a band. A video was released for the song "One Wish Away" that features an appearance by UniFlow, fire and lihtperformance group in Finland. The German magazine Orkus reviewed it as darker, more melancholic and more determined than the previous album.

=== New album announcement, and work with Feridea (2015) ===
In December 2014 Katra Solopuro joined Feridea as their vocalist. On January 10, 2015, Katra Solopouro announced via her Facebook account that she entered to studio to record a new album, in order to be released in the next spring Into A Dawn was released in March 2015 Feridea

=== Hiatus and return (2011–present) ===
Following Out of the Ashes, the band went on hiatus as Solopuro pursued theatre and performance projects. She appeared as Demeter in Cats at Tampereen Teatteri during the 2017–2018 season.

In February 2023, Katra released the comeback single Ever After, issued through Chic Music & Lumina Productions and distributed by Playground Music. The release marked the first new studio material in over a decade.

=== Press and honors ===
Katra have been featured in Germany's Orkus magazine, where they won "Best International Newcomer" in the 2009 fan poll, and China's X music magazine. Katra have also been nominated in the "Best Atmospheric/Symphonic Metal" category for the album Beast Within on the Estonian webzine Metal Storm.

== Line-up ==
Current members

- 2006: Katra Solopuro – vocals
- 2006: Kristian Kangasniemi – guitar
- 2006: Johannes Tolonen – bass
- 2009: Teemu Mätäsjärvi – guitar
- 2009: Matti Auerkallio – drums

Former musicians

- 2006: Jani Wilund – keyboards
- 2006: Tom "Tomma" Gardiner – guitar
- 2006-2009: Jaakko Järvensivu – drums

Tour musicians

- 2008: Teemu Mätäsjärvi – guitar

== Discography ==
=== Studio albums ===
- 2007: Katra (Edel)
- 2008: Beast Within (Napalm)
- 2010: Out of the Ashes (Napalm)

=== Singles ===
- 2006: Sahara
- 2007: Tietäjä/Vaaratar
- 2010: One Wish Away
- 2023: Ever After (2023)

=== Music videos ===
- 2007: Tietäjä
- 2008: Beast Within
- 2010: One Wish Away
