= Hoy No Me Puedo Levantar (song) =

Single by Mecano

from the album Mecano
- Language: Spanish
- English title: Today I Can't Wake Up
- B-side: "Quiero Vivir En La Ciudad"
- Written: 1981
- Released: June 22, 1981
- Recorded: 1981
- Studio: (Spain) Estudios Escorpio
- Genre: Techno-pop; new wave
- Length: 3:16
- Label: Discos CBS
- Composer: Nacho Cano
- Lyricist: José María Cano
- Producer: Jorge Álvarez

Mecano singles chronology
"Hoy No Me Puedo Levantar" (1981)	"Perdido En Mi Habitación" (1981)

Music video
- "Hoy No Me Puedo Levantar" on YouTube

"Hoy No Me Puedo Levantar" (Spanish for "Today I Can't Wake Up") is the debut single by Spanish band Mecano released in June 1981. The song is from their 1982 self-titled debut album.

== Composition ==
Mecano member Nacho Cano was trying to write a song for the record since his brother José María Cano had written all the songs. By 27 May 2015, Nacho Cano told periodist Ismael Cala for CNN en Español that the lyrics of the song came as a result of a hangover due to a party the day before. Cano also added that it was then that he discovered that creativity comes from everyday experiences.

== Release ==
The original 7-inch release of the song came with a B-side called "Quiero Vivir En La Ciudad". Despite its resonance in radio, the song was not included on the debut album until the 2005 rerelease, where it appears as a bonus track.

"Hoy No Me Puedo Levantar" instantly became a hit in Spain, where it sold over 100,000 copies between 1981 and 1982.

A mistake in the printing of the 7-inch single release occurred in which the date of the song release was dated as 1980, one year earlier than the original.

== Track listings ==
7-inch vinyl

No.	Title	Length
1.	"Hoy No Me Puedo Levantar"	3:16
2.	"Quiero Vivir En La Ciudad"	2:43

Digital download and streaming

No.	Title	Length
1.	"Hoy No Me Puedo Levantar"	3:16

== Certifications ==
Country	Certification	Equivalents	Ref.
Spain	2× Platinum	100,000^	
^Sales figures based on certification alone
