= Ana José Nacho =

Compilation album by Mecano
- Released: 24 March 1998 (Spain)
- Recorded: 1998
- Genre: Pop
- Length: 131:31
- Label: BMG Music Spain
- Producer: Mecano

Mecano chronology
Aidalai (1991)	Ana José Nacho (1998)	Mecano: Grandes Éxitos (2005)

Professional ratings
Review scores
Source	Rating
AllMusic	4.5/5 stars

Ana José Nacho is a compilation album by the group Mecano. It was released in 1998, and was produced by the group itself. There are two editions: Spain and France. It includes 8 new songs by the brothers Cano: José and Nacho; these tracks were recorded in CTS Studios and Belsize Park in London; and Red Led and Eurosonic in Madrid.

== Spain edition ==
This edition was presented in 2 CDs. The Spanish release includes eight new songs, six of which were culled out from the group's previous work, the album Aidalai; the other two are new versions of their successful song "Aire" (Air) and the song named "El club de los humildes" (The club of the humble ones).

The other six "new" songs are "Cuerpo y corazón" (Body and heart) that talks about the world of prostitution; "Otro muerto" (Another dead person) that shows different interpretations around the theme of death and terrorism; "Stereosexual", a story about a man questioning his sexuality (It was censored in some countries of Latin America), "El mundo futuro" (The future world) exhibits a concern for a life and feelings increasingly material and superficial; "Esto no es una canción" (This is not a song) tells a tragic story about how drug addiction is destroying the life of a man; and "Los piratas del amor" (Pirates of love) tells the experiences of men who are promiscuous and womanizers. An altered version of this song entitled "Canción de los piratas" (Song of the Pirates) was released as a single; this altered version featured child-friendly lyrics and was written for Telecinco's "Club Disney" container program.

The sleeve was designed by Ian Ross for Bill Smith Studio. Photography by David Scheinmann.

=== Track listing ===
- Disc 1
1. Cuerpo y corazón
2. Otro muerto
3. El club de los humildes
4. Aire (otra versión)
5. Un año más
6. Naturaleza muerta
7. Hoy no me puedo levantar
8. Dalí
9. El 7 de septiembre
10. Me cuesta tanto olvidarte
11. La fuerza del destino
12. No es serio este cementerio
13. Hermano sol, hermana luna
14. Una rosa es una rosa
15. Maquillaje
16. Hijo de la luna
- Disc 2
1. Stereosexual
2. El mundo futuro
3. Esto no es una canción
4. Los piratas del amor
5. El uno, el dos, el tres
6. Barco a Venus
7. Cruz de navajas
8. Ay, qué pesado
9. No hay marcha en Nueva York
10. Perdido en mi habitación
11. Hawaii-Bombay
12. Dalai Lama
13. Mujer contra mujer
14. Me colé en una fiesta

== French edition ==
The French edition of this compilation was released alongside the Spanish one. This edition features a single disc with six new songs in Spanish, three new songs in French, and a collection of previously released songs in French.

The three new songs in French are "Le club des modestes" (The club of the humble ones), "Corps et coeur" (Heart and body) and "Frère Soleil, Soeur Lune" (Brother Sun, Sister Moon). "Encore un mort" (Another dead person) was not included due to a last-minute mistake, but was recorded and released later on as a B-side single. The tracks were recorded in London.

=== Track listing ===
Tracks:

1. Une femme avec une femme
2. Hijo de la Luna (Dis-moi Lune d'argent)
3. Dalai Lama
4. No Hay Marcha en Nueva York
5. Le Club des modestes
6. Otro Muerto
7. Toi
8. 1 histoire à 3
9. Corps & Coeur
10. Le 7 septembre
11. Stereosexual
12. Esto No es Una Canción
13. El Mundo Futuro
14. Los Piratas del Amor
15. El Blues del Esclavo
16. Frère Soleil, sœur Lune
17. Aire (Nouvelle version)

== Charts ==
=== Album charts ===
#	Chart (1998)	Peak Position
1.	"Lat. Pop Albums"	10
2.	"Top Lat. Albums"	28
3.	"France Charts"	4
4.	"Belgium Charts"	15
5.	"Spain Charts"	1

#	Chart (2005)	Peak Position
1.	"Spain Charts"	22

- Note: This release reached the #10 position in Latin Pop Albums Billboard staying for 10 weeks and it reached the #28 position in the Billboard Top Latin Albums staying for 11 weeks in the chart.

=== Single charts ===
Date	Title	Chart Positions											B-Sides
Date	Title	ESP	MEX	CRI	CHL	COL	SLV	NIC	BOL	PER	VEN	U.S. Lat. Pop	B-Sides
23 March 1998	El club de los humildes	10	8	4	1	8	5	1	10	10	2	19	Hijo de la Luna
May; 1998	Stereosexual	2	3	10	1	1	5	10	9	10	10	-	Por la cara
September; 1998	Cuerpo y corazón	5	10	10	2	1	2	9	9	9	3	-	Cuerpo y corazón (Remix)
November; 1999	Otro muerto	10	10	-	-	-	-	-	-	-	-	-	Encore un mort
1999	El mundo futuro	-	9	-	-	-	-	-	-	-	10	-	-

== Certifications ==
Region	Certification	Certified units/sales
France (SNEP)	Gold	100,000^{*}
Spain (PROMUSICAE)	3× Platinum	300,000^{^}
^{*} Sales figures based on certification alone.^{^} Shipments figures based on certification alone.
