= Entre el cielo y el suelo =

Studio album by Mecano
- Released: June 16, 1986 (Spain)
- Genres: Synth-pop; pop; acoustic; ballad; Latin
- Length: 50:36
- Label: Ariola Eurodisc S.A.
- Producer: Mecano

Mecano chronology
Ya viene el Sol (1984)	Entre el cielo y el suelo (1986)	Descanso dominical (1988)

Singles from Entre el cielo y el suelo
- 1. "Ay qué pesado" Released: 28 April 1986; 2. "Cruz de navajas" Released: 28 July 1986; 3. "Me cuesta tanto olvidarte" Released: 1 December 1986; 4. "No es serio este cementerio" Released: 23 March 1987; 5. "Hijo de la luna" Released: 18 May 1987

Entre el cielo y el suelo (Spanish for Between the Sky and the Ground) is the fourth studio album by the Spanish synth-pop band Mecano, released on June 16, 1986 by Ariola. The album's title is taken from one of the lines of the single "Me cuesta tanto olvidarte".

Entre el cielo y el suelo was the first studio album by the Spanish band to be released under the Ariola label after CBS cancelled their contracts due to the fear on the band's decreasing record selling.

With the release of the singles "Ay qué pesado...", "Me cuesta tanto olvidarte", "Cruz de navajas" and "Hijo de la Luna" Mecano started to be recognized internationally in both sides of the western hemisphere. The first one receiving notably success in Hispanic America, while "Cruz de navajas" and "Hijo de La Luna" were better received in Europe; the latter one reaching the best positions of the chart in some countries.

Nationally "Cruz de navajas" and "Hijo de la luna" did well both on selling and airplay reaching the top 5 of the Spanish charts. While "Me cuesta tanto olvidarte" and "Ay... qué pesado" also appeared on the charts. It was later when "Me cuesta tanto olvidarte" would receive more attention until it became one of the band's signature songs and their most streamed one.

The album became the band's most popular release through time mainly because of its singles "Me Cuesta tanto olvidarte", "Hijo de la Luna" and "Cruz de navajas", as well as being the band's most streamed album on the Spotify platform.

== Reception ==
Professional ratings
Review scores
Source	Rating
AllMusic	4.5/5 stars

== Track listing ==
=== Spain CD/cassette Edition ===
Tracks:

No.	Title	English translation*	Length
1.	"Ay, qué pesado"	"What a drag!"	3:58
2.	"Ángel"	"Angel"	4:28
3.	"Hijo de la luna"	"Son of the moon"	4:21
4.	"50 palabras, 60 palabras ó 100"	"50 words, 60 words or 100"	3:57
5.	"Te busqué"	"I searched for you"	2:55
6.	"Me cuesta tanto olvidarte"	"It’s hard for me to forget you"	2:53
7.	"No tienes nada que perder"	"You've got nothing to lose"	3:00
8.	"Las curvas de esa chica"	"The curves on that girl"	3:09
9.	"No es serio este cementerio"	"This cemetery ain't serious"	4:25
10.	"Cruz de navajas"	"A cross of knives"	5:02
11.	"Las cosas pares"	"A couple of things"	2:25
12.	"Esta es la historia de un amor"	"This is the tale of a love"	3:59

*English translations not official

=== Spain LP and USA/Latin America CD Edition ===
Tracks:

No.	Title	English translation*	Length
1.	"Ay, qué pesado"	"What a drag!"	4:02
2.	"Ángel"	"Angel"	4:37
3.	"Hijo de la luna"	"Son of the moon"	4:22
4.	"50 palabras, 60 palabras ó 100"	"50 words, 60 words or 100"	4:04
5.	"Me cuesta tanto olvidarte"	"It’s hard for me to forget you"	2:57
6.	"No tienes nada que perder"	"You've got nothing to lose"	3:05
7.	"Las curvas de esa chica"	"The curves on that girl"	3:14
8.	"No es serio este cementerio"	"This cemetery ain't serious"	4:42
9.	"Cruz de navajas"	"A cross of knives"	5:04
10.	"Esta es la historia de un amor"	"This is the tale of a love"	3:58

*English translations not official

=== France ===
Tracks:

No.	Title	English translation*	Length
1.	"Ay, qué pesado"	"What a drag!"	4:02
2.	"Ángel"	"Angel"	4:37
3.	"50 palabras, 60 palabras ó 100"	"50 words, 60 words or 100"	4:04
4.	"Te busqué"	"I searched for you"	2:55
5.	"Me cuesta tanto olvidarte"	"It’s hard for me to forget you"	2:57
6.	"Héroes de la Antártida"	"Heroes from Antarctica"	5:09
7.	"Fábula"	"Fable"	2:05
8.	"No tienes nada que perder"	"You've got nothing to lose"	3:05
9.	"Las curvas de esa chica"	"The curves on that girl"	3:09
10.	"No es serio este cementerio"	"This cemetery ain't serious"	4:42
11.	"Las cosas pares"	"A couple of things"	2:25
12.	"Esta es la historia de un amor"	"This is the tale of a love"	3:58
13.	"Hermano sol, hermana luna"	"Brother sun, sister moon"	3:33
14.	"Laika"		4:37

*English translations not official

=== 2005 re-release ===
Tracks:

No.	Title	English translation*	Length
1.	"Ay, qué pesado"	"What a drag!"	3:58
2.	"Ángel"	"Angel"	4:28
3.	"Hijo de la luna"	"Son of the moon"	4:21
4.	"50 palabras, 60 palabras ó 100"	"50 words, 60 words or 100"	3:57
5.	"Te busqué"	"I searched for you"	2:55
6.	"Me cuesta tanto olvidarte"	"It’s hard for me to forget you"	2:53
7.	"No tienes nada que perder"	"You've got nothing to lose"	3:00
8.	"Las curvas de esa chica"	"The curves on that girl"	3:09
9.	"No es serio este cementerio"	"This cemetery ain't serious"	4:25
10.	"Cruz de navajas"	"A cross of knives"	5:02
11.	"Las cosas pares"	"A couple of things"	2:25
12.	"Esta es la historia de un amor"	"This is the tale of a love"	3:59
13.	"Canción cortita para antes que nos abandone el mar"	"A quick song for before the sea abandons us"	1:04
14.	"Figlio della luna"	"Son of the moon" (Italian version)	4:22

*English translations not official

== Charts ==
=== Album charts ===
#	Chart	Spain Peak Position	Date
1.	"Spain Album Charts" (2nd Edition)	#30	3 July 2005

=== Single charts ===
Date	Title	Chart Positions								B-Sides
Date	Title	United States H.Lat.	Spain	Mexico	Costa Rica	Chile	Colombia	Argentina	Germany	B-Sides
16 June 1986	Ay, qué pesado	17	1	1	2	2	4	9	-	Esta es la historia de un amor
28 July 1986	Cruz de navajas	49	1	1	1	1	1	1	-	Las cosas pares
1 December 1986	Me cuesta tanto olvidarte	-	1	2	5	1	1	6	-	Ángel
2 February 1987	No es serio este cementerio	-	7	15	25	13	24	30	-	50 palabras, 60 palabras ó 100
25 July 1987	Hijo de la luna	-	1	1	1	1	1	1	45	Te busqué
