= Une femme avec une femme =

1990 single by Spanish band Mecano

- French version picture sleeve

Single by Mecano

from the album Descanso Dominical
- B-side: "Mujer contra mujer"
- Released: 1990
- Length: 4:05
- Label: Ariola
- Songwriters: José María Cano, Pierre Grosz
- Producer: Mecano

Mecano singles chronology
"Los amantes" (1988)	"Une femme avec une femme" (1990)	"Dis-moi lune d'argent" (1991)

Audio sample
- "Une femme avec une femme": file; help

"Une femme avec une femme" (Spanish: "Mujer contra mujer") is a 1990 song by Spanish pop band Mecano. In late 1990, it was released as a single from the band's seventh album, released in 1988, Descanso dominical, on which it appears as the third track. It became a hit in France, reaching number one for seven weeks. Also in 1990, the song was notably covered by the pop duo formed by Argentine singers Sandra Mihanovich and Celeste Carballo as the title track of their studio album Mujer contra mujer, which is regarded as a landmark by the country's lesbian community. In 2003, the song was covered by Saya, becoming a top-10 hit in France.

== Background ==
To obtain a hit in France, Mecano decided to collaborate with Pierre Grosz, a lyric writer, who had already written several songs for Elsa ("Quelque chose dans mon cœur", "Jour de neige"). Grosz accurately translated their song "Mujer contra mujer" to produce the French single "Une femme avec une femme". The music is composed by José Maria Cano. It was recorded in French ("Une femme avec une femme") and Italian ("Per Lei contro di Lei"), giving Mecano their first truly global hit.

== Lyrics and video ==
This song deals with lesbianism, seen through the eyes of a friend, who does not want to pass judgment on this relationship and prefers to be tolerant. At the time, the subject was taboo in France and had almost never been addressed in a song.

The music video is largely in black and white and features Ana Torroja singing in front of a white fence. There are also two women in love who arm wrestle, which represents their different point of view regarding whether or not to hide their homosexuality – one of them says hiding it is not good, the other says there is no choice.

== Chart performance ==
"Une femme avec une femme" entered the French Top 50 Singles Chart at number 34 in the chart edition of 9 September 1990, climbed quickly and peaked at number one for seven weeks, from its eighth to its 14th week. Then it was dislodged by François Feldman's "Petit Frank" and stayed at number two for three weeks, then it kept on dropping in the chart and left off the top 50 after 22 weeks of presence. After a prestigious Iberian career, Mecano thus became the first Spanish group to reach first place in France's Singles Chart. The song was certified Gold disc in 1991 by the French certifier Syndicat National de l'Édition Phonographique, for a minimum of 250,000 copies sold.

On the Eurochart Hot 100, it debuted at number 100 on 6 October 1990, climbed every week until peaking at number eight in its eighth week. It totalled five weeks in the top ten and 20 weeks in the top 100.

== Track listings ==
7-inch single

1. "Une femme avec une femme" – 4:05
2. "Mujer contra mujer" – 4:05

CD maxi

1. "Une femme avec une femme" – 4:05
2. "Mujer contra mujer" – 4:05
3. "Hijo de la luna" – 4:18

== Charts ==
=== Weekly charts ===
Chart (1990–1991)	Peak position
Europe (European Airplay Top 50)	46
Europe (Eurochart Hot 100)	8
France (SNEP)	1
Quebec (ADISQ)	48

=== Year-end charts ===
Chart (1991)	Position
Europe (Eurochart Hot 100)	71

== Certifications ==
Certifications for "Une femme avec une femme"
Region	Certification	Certified units/sales
France (SNEP)	Gold	250,000^{*}
^{*} Sales figures based on certification alone.

== Sandra Mihanovich and Celeste Carballo version ==
"Mujer contra mujer"

Song by Sandra Mihanovich and Celeste Carballo

from the album Mujer contra mujer
- Released: October 1990
- Recorded: December 1989 – March 1990
- Studio: Panda; Del Cielito; (Buenos Aires)
- Genre: Pop rock
- Length: 3:48
- Label: RCA Records
- Producer: Fito Páez

Argentine singers Sandra Mihanovich and Celeste Carballo notably covered the song and included it as the title track of their second and final studio album as a pop duo, Mujer contra mujer, released in October 1990 by RCA Records. The choice of title, cover art and songs were centered on the message of lesbian love, considered a bold and unprecedented act in Argentine popular culture. Mujer contra mujer is widely remembered for a promotional campaign in which the city of Buenos Aires was wallpapered with large posters featuring its controversial cover photograph, which shows both singers in a naked embrace.

The song was produced by Argentine rock musician Fito Páez, who also played the piano, keyboard, bass and electronic drums. It is the opening track of the album's B-side. When promoting the record, Mihanovich and Carballo gave a famous performance of "Mujer contra mujer" at Susana Giménez' talk show, where they got very close to each other to share a microphone after one of them suddenly stopped working. The duo also appeared at Imagen de Radio, a TV program hosted by Juan Alberto Badía, where Carballo famously came out in a landmark moment for Argentine lesbians.

Today, the release of Mujer contra mujer is celebrated as a turning point in the visibility of lesbians within Argentine society, and a symbol for the local LGBT community. Writing for Página/12 in 2009, lesbian feminist journalist Marta Dillon reflected: "[Mujer contra mujer was] an outburst typical of convulsive years, of the end of a decade, that of the '80s, which called for, at least, attitude. And anyone who was a teenager then knows that the attitude those girls had was more challenging than any other taken by fleeting rock stars. How can we describe what that kick to the closet meant without appealing to our own memory? Also for those who didn't even dream that being a lesbian was possible, for those who fantasized, for those who fantasized but made an effort to have a boyfriend, for the gays from the provinces, for those from the city, for those who were alone, for those who couldn't read between the lines in Virus' lyrics or Freddie Mercury's drag attitude."

== Saya version ==
"Une femme avec une femme"

Single by Saya

from the album À la Vie
- B-side: "Ils croyaient"
- Released: 2003
- Length: 3:40
- Label: WEA, Warner Music France
- Songwriters: José María Cano, Pierre Grosz
- Producers: Quentin Bachelet, Adamson Faye

Saya singles chronology
"Tourner des pages" (2002)	"Une femme avec une femme" (2003)	"De l'or entre les mains" (2003)

In 2003, "Une femme avec une femme" was covered by French-born artist Saya who peaked at number nine on the French SNEP Singles Chart on 29 March and 5 April 2003 and remained on the chart for 17 weeks. It peaked at number 35 on the Swiss Singles Chart. The song is the second track on her album À la Vie, released in 2003. On 6 June 2003, the song was certified Silver disc (meaning over 100,000 copies were sold) four months after its release by SNEP, becoming Saya's greatest hit.

=== Track listings ===
CD single

1. "Une femme avec une femme" – 3:40
2. "Ils croyaient" – 3:31

=== Charts ===
Chart (2003)	Peak position
France (SNEP)	9
Switzerland (Schweizer Hitparade)	35

=== Certifications ===
Certifications for Saya's "Une femme avec une femme"
Region	Certification	Certified units/sales
France (SNEP)	Silver	125,000^{*}
^{*} Sales figures based on certification alone.

== Other cover versions ==
American singer Laura Branigan covered the Spanish version ("Mujer Contra Mujer") in 1993 for her final studio album, Over My Heart.

On 19 August 2010, American duo Ha*Ash participated in the album tribute for Mecano entitled, Tributo a Ana, José y Nacho, recording a new Spanish version of "Mujer Contra Mujer".
