= Beast Within =

2008 studio album by Katra

Studio album by Katra
- Released: August 29, 2008
- Genre: Symphonic metal
- Length: 49:00
- Label: Napalm

Katra chronology
Beast Within (2008)	Out of the Ashes (2010)

Beast Within is the second studio album by the Finnish symphonic metal band Katra, released on August 29, 2008 through the independent record label Napalm Records.

== Track listing ==
1. "Grail of Sahara" – 3:27
2. "Forgotten Bride" – 4:22
3. "Beast Within" – 3:57
4. "Fade to Gray" – 4:49
5. "Swear" – 3:45
6. "Promise Me Everything" – 4:22
7. "Mystery" – 3:08
8. "Flow" – 4:05
9. "Scars in My Heart" – 3:50
10. "Storm Rider" – 4:22
11. "Mist of Dawn" – 4:26
12. "Kuunpoika" – 4:27

== Personnel ==
- Katra Solopuro – vocals
- Teemu Mätäsjärvi – guitar
- Kristian Kangasniemi – guitar
- Johannes Tolonen – bass
- Matti Auerkallio – drums

== Reception ==
Metal Temple rated it 5/10 stars ("mediocre"), and wrote, "Beast Within is a nicely produced work by a new band consisted of great musicians but – for me – the problem is that this album doesn't offer something new, music wise."
