= ¿Dónde está el país de las hadas? =

Studio album by Mecano
- Released: May 13, 1983
- Genre: Synth-pop; post-punk
- Length: 39:52
- Label: CBS Discos
- Producer: Jorge Alvarez

Mecano chronology
Mecano (1982)	¿Dónde está el país de las hadas? (1983)	Ya Viene el Sol (1984)

¿Dónde está el país de las hadas? (Where is fairyland?) is the second album recorded by Spanish synth-pop band Mecano, in 1983. The album was produced by Jorge Álvarez and Mecano.

The album only had three singles: the first, "Barco a Venus", later became one of the most important singles in Mecano's history. "La Fiesta Nacional" and "El Amante de Fuego" followed as singles.

== Track listing ==
All tracks are written by Nacho Cano, except where noted

No.	Title	Length
1.	"¿Dónde está el país de las hadas?" (instrumental)	2:56
2.	"Este chico es una joya"	2:31
3.	"La bola de cristal"	3:23
4.	"El amante de fuego"	4:28
5.	"Madrid"	3:22
6.	"'Barco a Venus"	3:19
7.	"La fiesta nacional"	3:29
8.	"Un poco loco" (José María Cano)	3:22
9.	"No aguanto más"	3:09
10.	"Focas" (José María Cano)	3:25
11.	"El balón"	3:29
12.	"El ladrón de discos"	2:59
13.	"Viaje espacial" (Jose María Cano; Bonus Track on 2005 edition)	3:18

Bonus Tracks included on the B-side of some vinyl singles and maxi-singles
No.	Title	Length
1.	"Este chico es una joya" (16 April 1983)
2.	"El ladrón de discos" (25 July 1983)
3.	"Un poco loco" (14 November 1983)
4.	"The uninvited guest (Me colé en una fiesta-English version)/ London (Boda en Londres)" (1983)

== Singles ==
#	Title	B-side	Date
1.	"Barco a Venus"	Este chico es una joya	16 April 1983
2.	"La fiesta nacional"	El ladrón de discos	25 July 1983
3.	"El amante de fuego"	Un poco loco	14 November 1983
4.	"The uninvited guest"	London	1983

== Charts ==
#	Chart	Peak position	Date
1.	"Spain Albums Chart" (2nd Edition)	77	22 May 2005

== Credits and personnel ==
Recording and management

- Strings and brass were recorded in CBS Studio 1 (London), Engineer: Mike Ross
- Recorded and mixed in digital system in Scorpio Studios (Madrid), Engineer: Tino Azores
- Graphic Concept: Juan Oreste Gatti
- Flower pictures: Julio Lima
- Mecano pictures: Alejandro Cabrera

Vocals and instrumentation

- Ana Torroja – vocals
- Nacho Cano – keyboards, chorus
- Jose Maria Cano – guitars, chorus
- Luis Cobos – arrangements, orchestral direction
- Manolo Aguilar – bass
- Javier de Juan – drums
- Gustavo Montesano – guitars
