= Mecano (album) =

Studio album by Mecano
- Released: April 5, 1982
- Studio: Estudios Escorpio (Spain)
- Genre: New wave; synth-pop; post-punk
- Length: 44:27
- Language: Spanish
- Label: CBS
- Producer: Jorge Álvarez, Nacho Cano, Luis Cobos
- Compiler: Mecano

Mecano chronology
Mecano (1982)	¿Dónde está el país de las hadas? (1983)

Singles from Mecano
- 1. "Hoy No Me Puedo Levantar" Released: June 22, 1981; 2. "Perdido en mi Habitación" Released: December 7, 1981; 3. "Me Colé en Una Fiesta" Released: March 22, 1982; 4. "Maquillaje" Released: June 21, 1982; 5. "No Me Enseñen la Lección" Released: November 22, 1982

Mecano is the debut studio album recorded by Spanish synth-pop band Mecano, released on April 5, 1982, under the label Discos CBS.

The album spawned five singles, "Hoy No Me Puedo Levantar", "Perdido en mi Habitación", "Me Colé en Una Fiesta", "Maquillaje" and "No Me Enseñen la Lección", all of them receiving pop culture popularity in Spain. While two of them made it to number one in the Spanish Airplays, those being "Me Colé en Una Fiesta" and "Maquillaje". Both spending a week at the top of the charts, while the first of them spent six weeks atop the Spanish Singles Sales Chart. While "Hoy No Me Puedo Levantar" and "Perdido en mi Habitación" made it into the top 10 of the Spanish charts, peaking at number four and number two, respectively.

Mecano is one of the most commercially successful Spanish albums of all time, selling not much after its release 350,000 pure units and by the end of the year it had already sold over 1,000,000 in Spain alone, thus elevating Mecano to become the best-selling Spanish group and artist of the moment.

With a refreshing style of music, Mecano crowned the band as the new music sensations in Spain back in the early 1980s, becoming a commercial and critical success.

AllMusic rated the album with four out of five stars, adding, "Mecano is their first record, and one of their most popular, a glamorous effort in which listeners can already appreciate Nacho Cano's brilliant mind for composition. Synths and electronic devices mixed with poppy melodies and Torroja's sweet voice are heard throughout the record, forming a style that became the group's personal trademark from then on".

Mecano is better known in popular slang as the clock album due to the large clock that appears on the cover (although there is an alternate cover version, mainly marketed in Latin America in the late 1980s due to Mecano's success after changing record companies, in which they are shown standing idly over a backdrop scenery reminiscent of Roman ruins). In the 2005 re-issue a new track, "Quiero Vivir En La Ciudad", was included as a bonus track. With its 2023 pressing vinyl format Mecano increased in popularity, debuting at number 7 in the PROMUSICAE most popular vinyl list.

== Track listing ==
=== 12-inch version (1982) ===
Source for bonus track:

No.	Title	Length
1.	"Hoy No Me Puedo Levantar"
2.	"No Me Enseñen la lección"
3.	"Perdido en Mi Habitación"
4.	"Cenando en París"
5.	"Maquillaje"
6.	"Boda en Londres"
7.	"Me Colé en Una Fiesta"
8.	"Máquina de Vapor"
9.	"Me Voy de Casa"
10.	"254.13.26"
11.	"El Fin del Mundo"
12.	"Sólo soy Una Persona"

No.	Title	Length
13.	"Quiero Vivir en La Ciudad - Bonus Track (2005 rerelease)"

- Bonus Tracks included on the B-side of some vinyl singles and maxi-singles
1. "Quiero vivir en la ciudad".
2. "Viaje espacial" (single version).
3. "Napoleón".
4. "Súper-Ratón".

=== Singles ===
#	Title	B-side	Date	Sales
1.	"Hoy No Me Puedo Levantar"	Quiero vivir en la ciudad	22 June 1981	100,000
2.	"Perdido En Mi Habitacion"	Viaje Espacial	7 December 1981	75,000
3.	"Me Colé En Una Fiesta"	Boda en Londres	22 March 1982	75,000
4.	"Maquillaje"	Napoleón/Super Ratón	21 June 1982	60,000
5.	"No Me Enseñen La Lección"	Me voy de casa	22 November 1982	-

=== Covers ===
"Maquillaje" has later been recorded by many singers and bands, among them:

- Yuri (1989)
- Amarillo (2005)
- Ana Torroja (2006)
- Tatiana (2007)
- Cherry Ahava (2009)
- Jot Dog (2010)
- Nacho Cano presenta: Mecandance (2011)

== Charts ==
=== Album charts ===
#	Chart	Spain Peak Position	Date
1.	"Spain Album Charts" (2nd edition)	#10	Apr 10 2005

== Sales and certifications ==
Region	Certification	Certified units/sales
Spain (PROMUSICAE)	Gold	50,000^{^}
^{^} Shipments figures based on certification alone.

== Personnel ==
- Ana Torroja (vocals)
- Nacho Cano (keyboards, background vocals)
- Jose Maria Cano (guitars, background vocals)
- Manolo Aguilar (bass)
- Javier de Juan (Linn LM-1 drum machines on tracks 1–5, 7–11)
- Peter Van Hooke (Linn LM-1 drum machine and Simmons electronic drums on track 6)
- Luis Cobos (Linn LM-1 drum machine, sound effects, keyboards, and sax on "Quiero Vivir En La Ciudad")
- Carlos García-Vaso (uncredited; guitars on several tracks of the album)
