= Mecano =

Spanish pop band

- Mecano circa 1982, during photo sessions for the cover of their "Perdido en mi habitación" single; left to right: José María Cano, Ana Torroja, Nacho Cano

Background information
- Origin: Madrid, Spain
- Genres: Pop; synth-pop; new wave; pop rock
- Years active: 1981–1992; 1998
- Labels: CBS; Sony BMG
- Past members: Ana Torroja; Nacho Cano; José María Cano

Mecano was a Spanish pop band formed in 1981 and active until 1992. Mecano became one of the most successful Spanish pop bands of all time. The band is still the best-selling Spanish band, with over 20 million records worldwide. They were considered by some to be avant-garde for their time and part of la Movida Madrileña countercultural movement. They had a brief comeback in 1998.

The band's line-up consisted of singer Ana Torroja and brothers Nacho and José María Cano, who worked alongside session musicians such as Arturo Terriza, Manolo Aguilar, Nacho Mañó, Javier Quílez, Ángel Celada and Óscar Astruga. The trio's musical career spanned two distinct stages. The first, up to 1985, was essentially as a synthpop band, while in the second stage Mecano followed a more acoustic pop rock direction, with elements of ballad, dance, flamenco, bossa nova, tango, salsa, rumba flamenca, bolero, pasodoble, and even reggae.

The unprecedented success also hit Hispanic America. Also, thanks to adaptations to other languages of several of their songs, they influenced non-Spanish speaking countries such as Italy and France, as with their song "Une femme avec une femme". In 2005, Mecano's music was adapted into the successful musical Hoy no me puedo levantar, which opened productions in Spain and Mexico. After two years, it was announced that the musical had been seen by more than 1,500,000 spectators in both countries, making it the most successful original production in Spanish of all time.

Some of their biggest number one singles include "Me cuesta tanto olvidarte", "La fuerza del destino", "Hijo de la luna", "Cruz de navajas", "Une femme avec une femme" ("Mujer contra mujer", a worldwide number one hit), and "El 7 de septiembre".

== History ==
The band started as a synth-pop ensemble (tecno pop in Spanish) by brothers Nacho and José María Cano, along with singer Ana Torroja, in 1981 in Madrid influenced by English new wave band Spandau Ballet. In a period of cultural experimentation in the newly democratic Spain, Mecano achieved its initial popularity with its debut single, "Hoy no me puedo levantar" ("I Can't Get Up Today"), a song about youth boredom and hangovers. Their first, self-titled album became a collection of classics that would later represent Spanish 1980s pop music.

At the same time, Nacho Cano branched out into producing other bands, and both brothers started writing songs for other pop up-and-comers. Although those secondary acts wouldn't achieve the level of success Mecano gained, they turned out to be new testing grounds for Mecano.

After switching recording labels, passing from then CBS-Columbia (later Sony Music) to the Ariola label (later acquired by BMG music group) and having achieved another huge hit in 1986 with "Me cuesta tanto olvidarte" ("It's So Hard to Forget You"), the band reformed its musical approach with the album Entre el cielo y el suelo (Between the Sky and the Ground). Their new style emphasised pop over techno. It also facilitated the export of their music to Latin America. This new versatility was evidenced by "Hijo de la Luna" ("Son of the Moon"). This song was also submitted by the band as a potential contestant for Spain in the Eurovision Song Contest 1986, but TVE selected another band, Cadillac.

Their follow-up album, Descanso Dominical (Sunday Rest), produced two of their most popular singles. One was, "La fuerza del destino," ("The force of fate") in which actress Penélope Cruz debuted in the video clip for it. She later had a relationship with Nacho Cano for several years. The other single "Mujer contra mujer" ("Woman against woman"), is about a lesbian relationship, seen through the eyes of a friend, who only later realises what is going on. It was recorded in French ("Une femme avec une femme"), English and Italian, giving Mecano their first global hit. The single which was released in Latin America in 1989, became a number one hit, it also remained seven consecutive weeks on the French number one position from 10 November to 22 December 1990; the song became one of the greatest hits of all time in that country.

Aidalai (nonsense word meaning, "Oh Dalai"), their following album, was published in 1991 and was as successful as their previous two works.

"El 7 de septiembre" ("7 September") was dedicated to Coloma Fernández Armero, who was Nacho Cano's girlfriend for several years. "El 7 de septiembre", which was released in the summer of 1992, was the last Ibero-American number one hit for the band, a music video was released for the song and it was inspired by the 1927 German silent film Metropolis. It was the last original album of the band.

In 1993, the band announced a temporary hiatus.

In 1998, the band released the album Ana, Jose, Nacho, which mixed new songs with greatest hits. The band separated later that year and all three members went on to have solo careers, though only Ana found success as a singer. In 2005 keyboardist Nacho Cano wrote a musical based on 32 Mecano songs, named after their first single.

In 2005, the members of Mecano released a double-CD/DVD package commemorating the 25th anniversary of the creation of the band. The new CD/DVD, Mecanografia (Mecano-graphy), includes a compilation of all their singles, never-before released songs, and a DVD with videos and early concert appearances.

The Cano brothers were innovative musicians in the use of technology, and Nacho was one of the first Spanish musicians to own a Fairlight keyboard. (Its screen can be seen in the back cover of their only live album). José María also commented that he often locked himself in a room with a dictionary and books to write his songs, while Nacho has said that to compose he started off with a rhythm machine, then added the melody, and the lyrics came in last.

In November 2009, the band reunited with a new song to be released later that month.

On 25 November 2011, the journalist José Antonio Abellán announced their reunion in ABC Punto Radio for a world tour in 2012. This was later denied. Other media such as the newspaper El País, confirmed the news and the world tour.

== Band members ==
- Ana Torroja – lead vocals
- Nacho Cano – keyboards, synthesizers, backing vocals
- Jose Maria Cano – guitars, backing vocals

== Awards and nominations ==
Award	Year	Nominee(s)	Category	Result	Ref.
Lo Nuestro Awards	1993	"Una Rosa Es Una Rosa"	Video of the Year	Won	
MTV Video Music Awards	1992	"El 7 de septiembre"	Viewer's Choice	Nominated	
MTV Video Music Awards	1993	"Una Rosa Es Una Rosa"	Viewer's Choice	Nominated	

== Discography ==
=== Studio albums ===
- Mecano (1982)
- ¿Dónde está el país de las hadas? (1983)
- Ya viene el Sol (1984)
- Entre el cielo y el suelo (1986)
- Descanso Dominical (1988)
- Aidalai (1991)

=== Other releases ===
- Mecano: Obras Completas – 2005 (collection, released in a limited and numbered edition. The CDs inside the box are in digipack format. The box contains 8 original-CDs of their official discography in Spanish, yet it doesn't include albums in Italian or French. The box contains: 6 studio-albums + 1 live-album + 1 "CD Bonus" with previously unreleased songs)
- Tripack: Mecano: Grandes Éxitos – 2005 (a pack in the shape of 3-gatefold that contains 2 audio-CDs (15 songs each one, singles and non-singles) + 1 DVD with 20 official videoclips)
- Digipack: Mecanografía (La Historia En Imágenes) – 2006 (Luxury digipack with 4 DVDs, it contains presentations of Mecano in Televisión Española (TVE) + extra unpublished songs)
- Mecano contributed the song "Canción Cortita Para Antes que Nos Abandone el Mar" to the compilation album "Greenpeace, Salvemos al Mediterráneo" (1985).

=== Foreign-language recordings ===
Mecano recorded some of their songs in English, one of which was released as a single: "The Uninvited Guest", which is the English version of "Me Colé en Una Fiesta" ("I crashed a party"). Other songs recorded in English by Mecano are: Hawaii-Bombay and You, but these were never released officially.

Italian

Mecano also recorded many of their songs in Italian, such as:

- Figlio Della Luna (Hijo De La Luna)
- Croce Di Lame [Cruz de Navajas ("Cross of Knives")]
- Un Anno Di Più [Un Año Más ("Another Year")]
- Uno Di Quegli Amanti [Los Amantes ("The Lovers")]
- Per Lei Contro Di Lei [Mujer Contra Mujer]
- Il Cinema [El Cine ("The Movie Theatre")]
- Vado A Nuova York [No Hay Marcha En Nueva York ("Nothing Happens in New York")]
- Fermati A Madrid [Quédate En Madrid ("Stay in Madrid")]
- Mi Costa Tanto di Scordarti [Me Cuesta Tanto Olvidarte]
- Responso Positivo [El Fallo Positivo ("Positive Sentence")]
- Anna e Miguel [Naturaleza Muerta ("Still Life")]
- Una Rosa e Una Rosa [Una Rosa es Una Rosa ("A Rose is a Rose")]
- Tu ("You") (Italian version)
- "Dalai Lama" (Italian version)
- Il 7 Di Settembre [El 7 De Septiembre]
- "La Forza Del Destino" [La Fuerza del Destino].

French

Mecano recorded some songs in French including:

- Une Femme Avec Une Femme [Mujer Contra Mujer]
- Dis-Moi Lune D'Argent [Hijo De La Luna]
- "Une Histoire À Trois" [El Uno, El Dos, El Tres ("The One, The Two, and The Three")]
- Nature Morte [Naturaleza Muerta]
- Le Paradis Artificiel [El Lago Artificial ("The Artificial Lake")]
- Toi [Tú]
- "J.C." (French version)
- "Le 7 Septembre" [El 7 de Septiembre]

=== Unreleased songs ===
Some unreleased Mecano songs are Me Non Parle Vous Français ("I Don't Speak French"), Me he declarado en guerra ("I've Declared Myself At War"), Cristóbal Colón ("Christopher Columbus"), El Caballo de Espartero ("Espartero's Horse"), Solo ("Alone"), Lía ("Tie"), El Pez ("The Fish"), El Romance de la Niña María Luz ("The Romance of the Girl María Luz"), Arlequín ("Harlequin"), Al Alba ("At Dawn"), ¿Qué Haces Tú en el Mundo? ("What Do you Do in the World?"), among others.

=== Covers by other artists ===
Due to the popularity of their songs, Mecano has been covered by other artists in the Spanish-speaking as well as in the non-Spanish-speaking world. Songs from Entre el cielo y el suelo have been covered by Montserrat Caballé and Celia Cruz. Also, the unpublished song Lía was sung by Ana Belén. The Eurodance band Loona covered the song "Hijo de la luna" in 1998 and achieved a major hit with it. Laura Branigan recorded a version of "Mujer Contra Mujer" on her 1993 album Over My Heart. In 2008, Mexican singer Daniela Romo included the song in her album, Sueños de Cabaret. Cruz de Navajas was covered in a salsa style by Dominican singer Raulin Rosendo.

In 2004, Mexican pop singer Fey recorded the album La Fuerza Del Destino, an album consisting of 12 Mecano covers. This album was nominated for the Latin Grammy Awards in 2005. Costa Rican Latin grammy winners, Editus covered the song "Hijo De La Luna" in their album Siempre....

Non-Spanish covers include Sarah Brightman, who sang the songs "Tú", "Hijo de la luna", "Naturaleza Muerta". Mario Frangoulis covered "Hijo de la luna" and "Naturaleza Muerta." The Belgian-Spanish Belle Perez did the same. Greek singer Eleni Dimou covered "Hijo de la luna" translating it in Greek ("Πέφτει το φεγγάρι" - "Moon is falling").

The Spanish heavy metal band Stravaganzza covered the song "Hijo de la luna" in their most recent studio work: an EP called Hijo del Miedo (Son of Fear).

Recently the crossover soprano Geraldine Larrosa covered a French/Spanish version of "Naturaleza Muerta".

A Portuguese-language cover of "Hawaii–Bombay" was performed by Brazilian new wave band Metrô on their 1985 album Olhar. Portuguese singer José Cid also sung a version of his own.

In their 2008 album, Tales of Ithiria, the German symphonic metal band Haggard made a cover for "Hijo de la Luna".

A Finnish pop-folk artist Tuula Amberla released a cover in Finnish of "Hijo de la Luna" called "Kuun poika" in 1992, later a symphonic metal band Katra made the same cover in their 2008 album Beast Within.

In 2009, the Mexican singer Gloria Trevi sang a live cover of the song "Hijo de la Luna" on the Mexican television show, El Show de los Sueños. Also that same year the Brazilian-Venezuelan singer, Elisa Rego, did an electronic version of "Aire" song (Air) included in her fifth studio album titled "Temperamental". It is noteworthy that also in her beginnings (1982) Rego was the lead singer of ES-3, an underground rock band who specialized in performing Mecano covers in Caracas city night clubs long before this Spanish trio visited Venezuela for the first time in 1984 during the Promotional Tour of the "Ya Viene El Sol"-album (The Sun is Coming). Then their second visit to Venezuela was in 1986 in the promotional tour of "Entre el cielo y el suelo".

The Italian extreme gothic metal band Theatres des Vampires made an Italian-language cover of "Hijo de la Luna" in their 2011 album Moonlight Waltz.

== Bibliography ==
1. Book: "Mecano: La Explosión Del Pop Español", Author: Joan Singla, editions: "Martínez Roca", 144 pages, 20 × 13 cm., ISBN 84-270-0871-6.
2. Book: "Mecano (El Libro)", several authors, editions: "Luca", 128 pages, 24 × 20 cm., ISBN 84-87491-05-7. Includes a CD-PROMO with two Audio-tracks, "track 1" sung in Italian; "track 2" sung in French. Date of publication: August 1, 1992.
3. Book: "Mecano: La Fuerza Del Destino", authors: Carlos Del Amo and Javier Adrados PopAdrados, publishing house(editorial): "La Esfera De Los Libros", edition: 1st: 436 pages, ISBN 84-9734-177-5. Date of publication: April 20, 2004.

== See also ==
- List of best-selling Latin music artists
