= Nacho Cano =

Spanish arranger, composer and producer

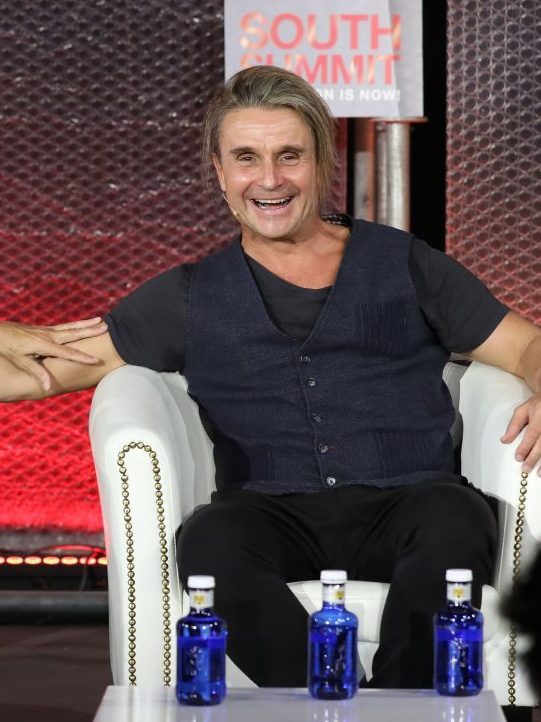
- Cano at the South Summit 2017

Background information
- Born: Ignacio de la Macarena Cano Andrés; 26 February 1963 (age 63); Madrid, Spain
- Occupations: Arranger; composer; producer; musician
- Years active: 1977–present
- Formerly of: Mecano

Ignacio "Nacho" Cano Andrés (b. Madrid, 26 February 1963), better known as Nacho Cano, is a Spanish arranger, composer, and record producer. He and his brother showed an interest in music in their young lives. At 5, he began to play the Spanish guitar and at 12 he started his first band called "Prisma", with Toti Arboles and Eduardo Benavente, both of whom would later make up the core of the sociocultural movement that took place in Spain after Franco's death, known as the "Movida Madrileña". After playing in several different bands in his early teens, Nacho formed Mecano with his brother Jose and his brother's friend Ana Torroja. At 16, Nacho wrote "Hoy No Me Puedo Levantar" ("I Can’t Get Up Today"). Mecano signed their first record deal with CBS, when Nacho was 17 years old. This first album smashed all sales records in Spain, selling 1,000,000 copies in three months.

At this time, Nacho met the influential Hans Zimmer who would help him produce and arrange Mecano's third album and his least sold album and the one that ends his contract with CBS Spain. Today, Nacho attributes Hans with teaching him the most important music lessons of his life. They remain friends and mentors to this day. It was during this journey also that Nacho met Penélope Cruz who would star in the music video for one of his most successful songs, "La Fuerza del Destino" (Destiny's Force). In 1992, seeking to escape the challenges that entail his success, he travelled to New York City with Penélope Cruz and wrote his first and best conceptual album "A World Split by the same god". They moved to London in 1994. Their relationship lasted through 1996, and they remain friends.

With 4 albums on the market in 2002 he composed the music to represent Madrid's 2012 Olympic candidacy, also used for the 2016 candidacy. In 2004, Nacho composed the official wedding music for Prince Felipe of Spain, a work commissioned as a gift by Madrid City Hall. In April 2005, he debuted his first musical "Hoy No Me Puedo Levantar" ("I Can't Get up Today"), again recalling the success of the earlier written song of the same name. This show would receive the highest earnings in the history of Spain, selling out day after day for over 5 years. The musical was received with equal enthusiasm in Mexico. Following this show he launched "A", a new musical that premiered in Madrid and Barcelona with great success. During the spring of 2010 in his Ibiza studio, Nacho composed the inauguration music for the European Athletics Championships, held in Barcelona. He composed this work alongside the aerial choreographer Hansell Cereza. Nacho currently lives in Miami, Florida, and divides his time between his yoga studio and his music.

== Malinche ==
Cano developed Malinche a Spanish-language stage musical, based on the Mexican Malinche legend. It premiered in Madrid in 2022. A Netflix documentary, Making Malinche: A Documentary by Nacho Cano, on the development of the show was produced in 2021.

In July 2024, Cano was arrested for allegedly hiring irregular migrants for the musical Malinche. The musician subsequently held a press conference in which he accused the police of being criminals. These declarations led the Spanish railway company Renfe to cancel the agreement with Malinche the following day due to its "potential reputational damage".

== Discography ==
=== Albums recording with Mecano ===
- Album: "Mecano" 1982
- Album: "¿Dónde Está El País De Las Hadas?" 1983
- Album: "Ya Viene El Sol" 1984
- Album: "Mecano En Concierto" 1985
- Album: "Lo Último De Mecano" 1986 album not official published by CBS Columbia. Album with 4 unpublished songs in studio: 3 songs of 1982 and 1 song of 1984 and too 4 live-songs of 1985's Tour (Concert at "Frontón De Segovia").
- Album: "Greenpeace, Salvemos Al Mediterráneo" 1986 album not official published by RCA/Ariola. Only 1 song of Mecano: "Canción cortita para antes que nos abandone el mar" (I. Cano – 00 min. 57 seg.)
- Album: "Entre El Cielo Y El Suelo" 1986 (Spain edition) 12 songs.
- Album: "Entre El Cielo Y El Suelo" 1986 (US & Latin-America edition) 10 songs.
- Album: "Entre El Cielo Y El Suelo" 1986 (France edition) 14 songs.
- Album: "Figlio Della Luna" 1989 (Italy edition) 9 songs in Italian + 1 instrumental.
- Album: "Descanso Dominical" 1988 (edition in Spanish) 14 songs.
- Album: "Descanso Dominical" 1990 (France edition) 1 song in French + 11 songs in Spanish.
- Album: "Aidalai" 1991 (edition in Spanish) 12 songs + 1 instrumental.
- Album: "Aidalai" 1991 (Italy edition) 6 songs in Italian.
- Album: "Aidalai" 1991 (France edition) 7 songs in French.
- Album: "Ana/José/Nacho" 1998 compilation double-album in Spanish: 7 "new" songs + 23 old hits.
- Album: "Ana-José-Nacho" 1998 (France edition) compilation unique-disc: 3 new songs in French + some of 7 "new" songs in Spanish and old songs in French.

=== Solo career albums ===
- Un mundo separado por el mismo dios (A world split by the same God). (Virgin, 1994)
- El lado femenino (The feminine side) (Virgin/EMI Benelux B.V., 1996)
- Amor Humor (Love Humor) (Virgin Benelux, B.V., 1999)
- Nacho Cano (Nocontroles, 2001)
