= Ana Torroja =

Spanish pop singer (born 1959)

The Most Illustrious Ana Torroja 3rd Marchioness of Torroja
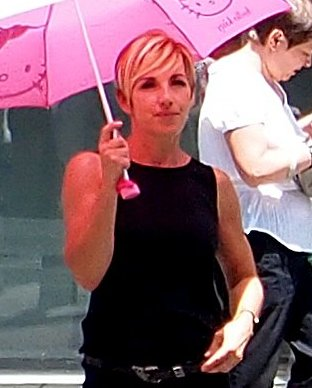
- Torroja in 2010

Background information
- Born: Ana Torroja Fungairiño; 28 December 1959 (age 66); Madrid, Spain
- Genres: Pop; synth-pop; post-punk; new wave
- Occupation: Singer
- Instrument: Vocals
- Years active: 1981–present
- Formerly of: Mecano

Ana Torroja Fungairiño, 3rd Marchioness of Torroja (born 28 December 1959) is a Spanish singer and aristocrat. She was the lead singer of the pop trio Mecano, considered one of the most popular pop bands from Spain during the 1980s and 1990s. Mecano split in 1998, and she embarked on a solo career.

== Early years ==
Torroja is the eldest of six siblings: Celia, Yago, Laura, Javier, and Carlos. Her father, José Antonio Torroja, 2nd Marquess of Torroja, was a prestigious civil engineer, as was her grandfather, Eduardo Torroja Miret, 1st Marquess of Torroja, and perhaps the world's leading expert in concrete construction of his time. Her mother, María del Carmen Fungairiño Bringas, a nurse and homemaker to whom Ana was very close, was the sister of the well-known and controversial prosecutor Eduardo Fungairiño. She died on September 26, 1985, when Ana was twenty-four years old and Mecano was at the height of its success.

== Career ==
Ana Torroja met José María Cano while studying economics at university. The two became good friends, and José María soon introduced her to his younger brother, Nacho. After hearing Ana sing José María's guitar compositions, Nacho suggested that the three form a band. In 1981, at 22 years old she became the vocalist of Mecano.

After seven Mecano albums and huge success in Europe and Latin America, the continuous touring began taking its toll on the band. Ana was especially affected and started developing vocal problems. In an interview the artist recalls: "I am a person, even if it may not seem so, very shy and I am also a very reserved person with my other part, with my other half, with Ana just. So, being so exposed made me feel very vulnerable and that vulnerability became almost, almost agoraphobia, it didn't really become agoraphobia. but I say it like this to explain a little what I felt, it scared me, I didn't want to go outside because it couldn't be me, because people immediately screamed, they went crazy, they wanted to touch you, they wanted to hug you, they wanted to hear from you, I felt like... how to explain it... like some kind of freak, and I didn't like that feeling."

In 1993, the band announced a temporary split. While José and Nacho released solo albums, Ana chose to travel around the world and visited Hawaii, Mumbai, and New York City—places she had sung about while with Mecano. She eventually settled in New York and took dance classes.

By 1997, Ana felt confident enough to sing again and moved to London to record her first solo album, Puntos Cardinales (Cardinal points). The album, produced by Tony Mansfield, marked a curious change for Ana. Because her new songs were not written from a male point of view—unlike the Mecano hits written by the Cano brothers—she felt that she could express herself as a woman for the first time. The first single from the album, A Contratiempo, was a Spanish-language cover of an old Bette Midler song, "Bottomless". Both the album and the single went to No.1 in Spain.

In 1998, partially due to the cost and commercial failure of José María's opera project, Mecano reunited for the double-disc greatest hits compilation Ana, José, Nacho, which also featured seven new songs.

Ana's biggest solo success came in 1999 with her album, Pasajes de un Sueño (Passages of a dream). This album was hailed by critics and the first single, "Ya No Te Quiero" ("I don't love you anymore" or "I don't want you anymore"), became one of the best-selling songs in Spain that year. As a part of the promotion of this album, Torroja undertook, together with Miguel Bosé the Girados tour in May 2000, throughout Spain, the United States, and part of Latin America. The tour concluded at the beginning of the following year.

In 2001, Ana tried to reconquer the French audience she had won over at the time of Mecano, recording the album Ana Torroja.

She then took part in the recording of the disc Duetos 2 by the Mexican artist Armando Manzanero, with whom she recorded the song "Nada personal" ("Nothing personal").

In 2003 she published her third album Frágil (Fragile), in which she presented a more genuine pop-based image. For the album, she appeared for the first time solo on stage, in a brief tour across America and Europe called the Gira Frágil (Fragile Tour). It was this material that consolidated her success as a solo artist, and with which she also obtained numerous nominations and prizes such as the Grammy Latino, Shangay (Spain) and Oye (Mexico).

Shortly afterwards, she took a brief break from her musical career, guesting with artists such as Mexican singer, composer, and keyboard player Aleks Syntek in 2004. She dueted with Syntek on the song "Duele el Amor" ("Love hurts"), which was a major commercial success. That same year she did a duet with Italian singer Gigi D'Alessio, a new song called "Bacio" ("kiss") in Italian, a cover of the same song also sung by Gigi D'Alessio with Anna Tatangelo.

In 2006, Ana released a new studio album called Me Cuesta Tanto Olvidarte, produced by Syntek. The album contained new versions of old Mecano hits. The first single was "Los Amantes", which reached No. 2 on the Spanish charts.

In 2008, Ana decided to work with Schiller, singing Por qué te vas, which went to Number One in the Sehnsucht album charts in (Germany).

On 17 May 2008, Ana Torroja was invited by Aleks Syntek to take part in the macro concert of the Fundación ALAS, in aid of children in Latin America. She sang "Me cuesta tanto olvidarte", "Duele el amor", "Corazones", and "Te amaré" (alongside all the invited artists).

On 10 October 2008, she was seriously injured in a car crash in Cádiz, from which she fully recovered.

Ana's music has managed to spread further than just France and Germany. In 2010, British singer Jack Lucien announced that he had covered her song "Hoy ya no te quiero" for his forthcoming third studio album.

In October 2010 Ana released Sonrisa (Spanish for smile), her fifth original studio album in Spanish. The album was produced by the Venezuelan Andrés Levin, who also produced her second album. The recording of the album started in 2008, the album being originally scheduled for release in March 2009. The release had however been delayed due to her car accident in 2008. So far Sonrisa has been met with favourable reviews.

In 2023, she competed in the third season of the Spanish version of The Masked Singer as "Ratita" and was declared co-winner along Fernando Morientes, who competed as "Gorila".

== Titles and honours ==
In 2022, after her father's death, she inherited the title of Marchioness of Torroja and the style of "The Most Illustrious".

=== Honours ===
- Cross of Merit, Order pro merito Melitensi

== Discography ==
=== Studio albums ===
- Puntos cardinales (1997)
- Points Cardinaux (1997)
- Pasajes de un sueño (1999)
- Ana Torroja (2001)
- Frágil (2003)
- Me Cuesta Tanto Olvidarte (2006)
- Sonrisa (2010)
- Mil Razones (2021)
- Se Ha Acabado El Show (2026)

=== Live albums ===
- Girados en concierto – a collaboration with Miguel Bosé (2000)
- Conexión (2015)

=== Compilations ===
- Esencial (2004)

== Covers and collaborations ==
- "A contratiempo" and "Les murs" (version en français) ("Bottomless" – Bette Midler) (1995)
- "Hold on" (duet with Jason Hart) (1997) (marketed in 2005)
- "Si fuera tú" (1997) (If It were you) – Jason Hart
- "No estás" (1999) (Don't fall) – Jason Hart
- "Media luna" (duet with Deep Forest) (1997)
- "Dulce pesadilla" (1999) (Sweet nightmare) – Jason Hart
- "Veinte mariposas" ("Hidden like a secret" – Josefina Sanner/Jimmy Wahisteen/Jorge Drexter) (2003)
- "Quien dice" ("I really don't think so" – Tina Harris/Marc Nelkin/Jamie Hartman) (2003)
- "Sólo por eso" ("Rien que pour ça" – Tristan Boccara/Nathaniel Brendel) (2003)
- "Cuatro días" ("Would you like to know" – Tina Harris/Mats Bernhoft/Anders Bagge) (2003)
- "Menos, más" ("Vers ta voix" – Tino Izzo/Diane Cadieux) (2003)
- "I wish you were here" ("Wish you were here" – Waters G.) (2003)
- "Sweet Lullaby" (duet with Deep Forest) (2003)
- "Duele el amor" (duet with Aleks Syntek)("Love breaks your heart") (2004)
- "Enfant de la lune" (duet with Psy 4 de la Rime, a French hip hop group) (2005)
- "Porque te vas" (duet with Schiller) (2008)
- "Hijo de la luna" (duet with Raphael) (2008)
- "Mujer contra mujer" (duet with Garson) (2012)
- "Mujer contra mujer" (duet with Ha*Ash) (2012)
- "Todo No Fue Suficiente" (duet with Ha*Ash) (2012)
- "La fuerza del destino" (duet with Ha*Ash) (2012)
- "A contratiempo" (duet with Benny Ibarra) (2012)
- "Reforma" (duet with Ximena Sariñana) (2016)
- "Cruz de Navajas" (duet with Álvaro López) (2016)
- "Mujer contra mujer" (duet with Nicole) (2016)
- "Duele el amor" (duet with Gepe) (2016)
- "Me cuesta tanto olvidarte" (duet with Luis Fonsi) (2016)

== See also ==
- Marquesado de Torroja
