= Self discography =

- Studio albums: 5
- EPs: 3
- Live albums: 5
- Compilation albums: 3
- Singles: 13

Self is an American pop rock band formed in Murfreesboro, Tennessee. The band is led by Matt Mahaffey, and has been active since 1993. Chris James, Mac Burrus, Jason Rawlings, and Brian Rogers are additional members, while past members include Mike Mahaffey and Tim Nobles.

== Albums ==
=== Studio albums ===
List of studio albums, with selected details and chart positions
Title	Album details	Peak chart positions	
Title	Album details	CMJ	CMJ Alt
Subliminal Plastic Motives	Released: October 24, 1995; Label: Zoo, Spongebath, Fat Possum; Format: CD, LP, cassette	—	64
The Half-Baked Serenade	Released: April 24, 1997; Label: Spongebath; Format: CD	70	48
Breakfast with Girls	Released: July 13, 1999; Label: DreamWorks, Spongebath; Format: CD, LP, cassette	18	19
Gizmodgery	Released: September 5, 2000; Label: Spongebath, El Camino; Format: CD, LP, digital download	4	9
Ornament & Crime	Released: August 25, 2017; Label: El Camino; Format: CD, LP	×	×
"—" denotes albums that did not chart. "×" denotes periods where charts did not exist.

=== Live albums ===
List of live albums, with selected details
Title	Album details
Halloween Bashaton	Released: October 30, 1999; Label: Spongebath; Format: digital download
Live At Wherehouse Music	Released: December 1, 1999; Label: Spongebath; Format: CD, digital download
Live At The Exit/In	Released: January 21, 2006; Label: Independent; Format: digital download
Live at Spaceland Acoustic	Released: Unreleased; Label: Independent; Format: DVD
Daytrotter Session	Released: March 25, 2015; Label: Wolfgang's, Paste; Format: digital download

== Extended plays ==
List of extended plays, with selected details
Title	Album details
Brunch	Released: September 23, 1999; Label: DreamWorks, Spongebath; Format: CD
Self Goes Shopping	Released: December 16, 2000; Label: Spongebath; Format: Digital download
Super Fake Nice	Released: July 29, 2014; Label: El Camino; Format: CD, LP

== Compilations ==
List of compilations, with selected details
Title	Album details
Feels Like Breakin' Shit	Released: 1998; Label: Spongebath, DreamWorks; Format: Digital download
Selfafornia	Released: July 27, 2001; Label: Spongebath; Format: Digital download
Porno, Mint & Grime	Released: April 14, 2005; Label: El Camino; Format: CD, LP, digital download

== Singles ==
List of singles as lead artist, showing year released and album name
Title	Year	Album
"Cannon"	1995	Subliminal Plastic Motives
"So Low"	1996	Subliminal Plastic Motives
"Paint by Numbers"	1998	Breakfast With Girls
"Meg Ryan"	1999	Breakfast With Girls
"KiDdies"	1999	The Half-Baked Serenade
"Trunk Fulla Amps"	1999	Gizmodgery
"Stay Home"	2001	Shrek: Music from the Original Motion Picture
"Grow Up"	2003	Ornament & Crime
"Could You Love Me Now?"	2010	Non-album single
"Looks and Money"	2011	Super Fake Nice
"Runaway"	2014	Super Fake Nice
"Monogamy"	2015	Non-album singles
"Love You Less"	2024	Non-album singles

=== Promotional singles ===
List of promotional singles, showing year released and album name
Title	Year	Album
"Stewardess" / "Borateen"	1995	Subliminal Plastic Motives
"So Low" / "Borateen"	1996	Subliminal Plastic Motives
"Sucker"	1999	Breakfast With Girls
Awareness! ("Meg Ryan" / "It All Comes Out In The Wash")	1999	Breakfast With Girls

== Music videos ==
List of music videos, showing year released and director
Title	Year	Director
"Cannon"	1995	Jesse Peretz
"So Low"	1996	Jesse Peretz
"Trunk Fulla Amps"	1999	Reed Ridley
"Could You Love Me Now?"	2010	Bodie Orman
"Runaway"	2014	Ballard C. Boyd
"Looks and Money"	2015	Dave Foley

== Other appearances ==
Title	Year	Album	Length
"Shame"	1998	For the Masses	4:12
"Stay Home"	2001	Shrek: Music from the Original Motion Picture	3:32
"This Is Love"	2006	Another Gay Movie Soundtrack	2:14
"Ana Ng"	2006	Hello Radio: The Songs of They Might Be Giants	3:22
"State Run Radio" (Lupe Fiasco featuring Self)	2011	Lasers	3:57
"Stranger than Strange"	2014	Songs for Blake - Embracing Autism	3:38
"Merry Christmas, Santa" (Cake In Space featuring Self)	2024	Christmas in Space	2:31
