= Porno, Mint & Grime =

2005 compilation album by Self

Compilation album by Self
- Released: April 14, 2005
- Recorded: September 2000–January 8, 2004
- Studios: Royaltone (North Hollywood); Crackertracks (Studio City); Larrabee (Los Angeles)
- Genres: Pop rock; power pop; internet music; alternative rock
- Length: 70:04
- Labels: Independent; El Camino Media (reissue)
- Producer: Matt Mahaffey

Self chronology
Selfafornia (2001)	Porno, Mint & Grime (2005)	Break out the Battle Tapes (2006)

Porno, Mint & Grime is the third compilation album by the American pop rock band Self, released on April 14, 2005, independently as a free internet download. It primarily consists of demos produced during the recording sessions of their fifth studio album, Ornament & Crime (2017). Originally released throughout 2004, it was meant to tide fans over until a release of Ornament & Crime was feasible. A month after Porno, Mint & Grime's release, Self's guitarist Mike Mahaffey died of unknown causes, culminating in a band hiatus.

Upon release, Porno, Mint & Grime was met with favorable to mixed reviews. Several songs from the album would appear on various films, including Win a Date with Tad Hamilton! (2004), Another Gay Movie (2004) and the Guinness World Record-awarded Team Fortress 2 machinima Team Fabulous 2 (2012).

== Background ==
In May 2000, Self frontman Matt Mahaffey and pianist Chris James moved to Los Angeles to be closer to their major label DreamWorks Records, followed by bassist Mac Burrus in September. In March 2001, the band announced that they had begun recording demos for their upcoming fifth album, speculated for a Summer release. Throughout the production of their fifth studio album, later named Ornament & Crime (2017), it suffered from label interference and setbacks, leading to several delays. This culminated with its eventual shelving after DreamWorks was purchased by Universal Music Group on January 9, 2004, a day after the band had finished recording the album, resulting in the band being dropped.

== Production ==
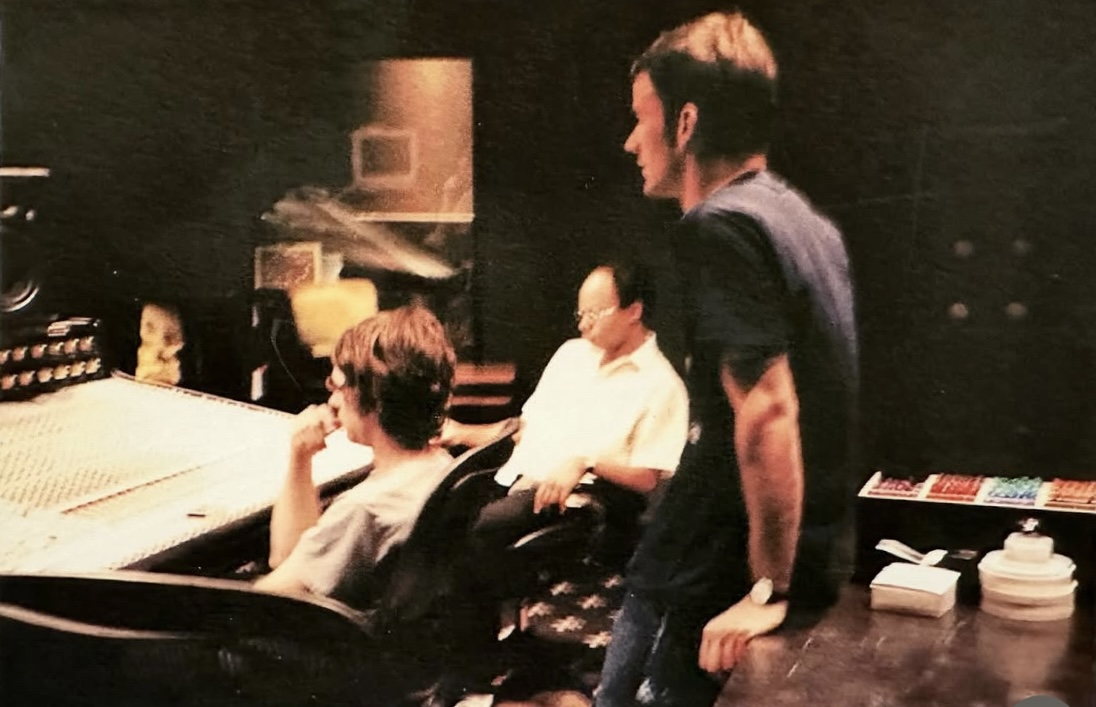
Self during the recording of Ornament & Crime in 2002.

Self recorded various demos during the production of Ornament & Crime, many of which would later be included as a part of Porno, Mint & Grime. On September 9, 2002, Mahaffey recorded a demo for "Pretty One," which had originated from a jam session the previous year, and a demo for "Breakdown", with plans to record studio versions later that month. Mahaffey additionally recorded the song "This is Love" for the 2004 American animated fantasy comedy film Shrek 2, meant to mimic the American rock band Weezer's Island in the Sun, but the song was rejected as the producers wanted a new song from Weezer.

== Release ==
=== Independent song releases and Tunes of the Week ===
Various songs from Porno, Mint & Grime had been available prior to their official release. On October 5, 2000, "Brooklyn" was aired on the student-run radio station WMTS-FM. "See If You Swim" was previously released on volume 9 of the Japanese pop fanzine Kheer in April 2001, later being included on Self's second compilation album Selfafornia (2001).

On January 20, 2002, Self announced that they would launch a new website for sharing band updates and contact information, including new music by the band. Upon launch, the band released the song "Busy Sending Me". On August 5, Self released "Potential," followed by "Breakdown" and "Pretty One" on September 9, released on their website as parts of "Tunes of the Week." By April 7, 2004, Self had run out of b-sides and demos to share on their website, with an announcement that the band would be performing at Spaceland as Britt Daniel's opening act. In 2004, the song "While the Gangsters Sleep" was used in the film "The Bros." "This is Love" was featured in trailers promoting the 2004 American romantic comedy film Win a Date with Tad Hamilton!, and was featured on the soundtrack to the American romantic comedy film Another Gay Movie released on July 28, 2006.

=== Selfies and vinyl release ===
Self released Porno, Mint & Grime on April 14, 2005, on the fan forum Selfies, with the songs having been available previously on their official site through streaming. The album cover was created by band associate Brad Ross-MacLeod, and features an essay by Mahaffey discussing the recording of Ornament & Crime and Porno, Mint & Grime, alongside his feelings towards the final product. A small manga-influenced comic strip is also included, created by L.M. Lorady (Azarath), Azarath had previously created the cover for Self's "Grow Up" single in 2003.

On June 9, 2017, El Camino Media announced that they would officially release Ornament & Crime and Porno, Mint & Grime on vinyl for the first time, planning for a Summer release date. The album was released on August 25, 2017, as a limited-edition vinyl, with autographed copies being sold as ticket bundles for WRLT's Ellison Place Street Festival. It featured new cover artwork by Andy Suriano, originally drawn in 2008, with Self logo and the album text layered above the artwork. On October 24, 2025, both Porno, Mint & Grime and Ornament & Crime were published to streaming services in celebration of Subliminal Plastic Motives' 30th anniversary.

== Reception ==
In 2010, the Duluth News Tribune retrospectively compared Porno, Mint & Grime to Psalm One's Woman at Work series, citing a wide range of style and genres.

== Legacy ==
A month after the release of Porno, Mint & Grime Self guitarist Mike Mahaffey would pass away in his sleep of unknown causes, the band would play a show in his honor on September 10, performing the song "Pretty One." A live bootleg recording of the concert was uploaded to Selfies on January 31, 2006. Combined with the shelving of Ornament & Crime, Self would enter a hiatus shortly after Mike Mahaffey's death. Porno, Mint & Grime would remain the band's last studio work until the EP Super Fake Nice (2014).

In 2012, "While the Gangsters Sleep" was used in the Team Fortress 2 machinima Team Fabulous 2 by Kitty0706, and by February 2016, the video had received over 17 million views, gaining an award from Guinness World Records for being the "Most watched Team Fortress machinima on YouTube". Kitty0706, whose real name was Colin Wyckoff, died on January 25, 2015. Mahaffey commented on an upload of the track "Out with a Bang" sharing his condolences.

== Track listing ==
All tracks are written by Matt Mahaffey except where noted.

Porno, Mint
No.	Title	Writer(s)	Length
1.	"Breakdown"		2:18
2.	"With You Somehow"		3:24
3.	"Summersound"		3:26
4.	"While the Gangsters Sleep"	Chris James; Jason Rawlings; Mac Burrus; Mahaffey; Mike Mahaffey	2:48
5.	"Gotta Stop (Messin' About)"	Prince Rogers Nelson	2:50
6.	"Donating to Science"		4:10
7.	"Busy Sending Me"	Burrus; Mahaffey	3:15
8.	"This is Love"		2:17
9.	"See If You Swim"		3:23
10.	"Call Me Back"	Shane Ball; Darren Ledford; Kevin C. Torbett	3:01
Total length:			30:52

Grime
No.	Title	Writer(s)	Length
11.	"Now"		4:22
12.	"(You're So) Deadly"		2:35
13.	"Pretty One"	James; Rawlings; Burrus; Mahaffey; Mahaffey	2:54
14.	"Punk Bitch Flash"		3:25
15.	"Brooklyn"		4:34
16.	"I Knew What I Know Now"	Burrus; Mahaffey	3:59
17.	"Keepaway"		2:53
18.	"Potential"		3:46
19.	"Evolution"		4:01
20.	"Glue"		2:35
Total length:			65:56

2005 release
No.	Title	Writer(s)	Length
21.	"She's An Island"	Brian Bottcher	3:31
22.	"No B-Sides"		0:47
Total length:			70:04

Notes

- "Pretty One" was originally titled "Pretty" in 2002.

== Personnel ==
Credits adapted from the album’s liner notes.

Musicians

- Matt Mahaffey – vocals, guitar, drums, piano, various instruments
- Jason Rawlings – drums
- Mac Burrus – performer, bass
- Mike Mahaffey – guitar, vocals
- Chris James – piano
- Geoff Gallegos – strings, horns
- Swan Burrus – backing vocals, performer
- Seth Timbs – backing vocals, performer
- Ken Andrews – performer
- Ken Coomer – performer
- Gary Welch – performer

Technical

- Robert Carranza – engineer
- Rich Costey – mixing engineer
- Mario Caldato Jr. – production, assistant engineer
- Mickey Petralia – production, assistant engineer
- Matt Mahaffey – production, assistant engineer
- Chris James – assistant engineer
- Dan Leffler – assistant mixing engineer
- Brad Ross-MacLeod – 2005 artwork
- Andy Suriano – 2017 artwork

== Release history ==
Release dates and formats
Region	Date	Format(s)	Label	Ref.
Various	August 25, 2017	CD; vinyl LP	El Camino	
