= Self Goes Shopping =

EP by Self
- Released: December 16, 2000
- Studio: Matt's House (Murfreesboro)
- Genres: Chiptune; electronica; bossa nova; techno; jazz; doo-wop
- Length: 18:18
- Label: Spongebath
- Producers: Matt Mahaffey; Mike Mahaffey

Self chronology
Gizmodgery (2000)	Self Goes Shopping (2000)	Selfafornia (2001)

Self Goes Shopping is the second extended play by the American pop rock band Self, released through Spongebath Records as an internet download on December 16, 2000. The EP was produced in just two days, created as pre-show music for the tour of their fourth studio album, Gizmodgery (2000). It is the band's only work to consist of remixes, featuring songs from Subliminal Plastic Motives (1995), The Half-Baked Serenade (1997), Breakfast with Girls, and Brunch (both 1999). Upon release, Self Goes Shopping was met with mixed reception from both concert audiences and critics.

== Background ==
In September 2000, the American pop rock band Self released their fourth studio album Gizmodgery through their home label Spongebath Records, performing a short tour to promote the album. During the tour, the band would often play instrumental remixes of previously released songs as pre-show music. Self frontman Matt Mahaffey and his brother Mike Mahaffey created these remixes in the span of two days in the bathroom of Matt's house. He used an Ensoniq EPS-16 Plus to sequence the project, additionally sampling toys from Gizmodgery alongside MIDI instrumentation. For the project's remix of "Uno Song", Matt was inspired by Billy Joel's "Allentown" to incorporate doo-wop harmonies. For "Crimes on Paper", he composed it to be as cheesy as possible to annoy audiences before they recognized the song.

== Release ==
Shortly after Gizmodgery's release, Mahaffey stated plans to release Self Goes Shopping through DreamWorks Records, only intending to do so if their following album took longer to release. Although DreamWorks distribution was planned, the EP was instead published on Spongebath's website as an exclusive internet download. Released on December 16, 2000, it replaced the website's download for Self's first compilation album, Feels Like Breakin' Shit (1998). Self Goes Shopping was followed by Self's second compilation album, Selfafornia (2001), another free download.

== Reception ==
Initial crowd reactions to the Self Goes Shopping remixes were mixed, with Mahaffey stating "It was really fun to watch people in the crowd be like, WTF, oh! WTF". Gerald Dih of AudioPhix compared the "Super Mario Mix" of "Fliptop Box" to that of black comedy, contrasting the songs serious nature with an "absurdly fun feeling of adventure, void of any context". Dih additionally praised the "David Sanborn Mix" of "Crimes on Paper", highlighting it as the best track on the EP, but criticized the "Rave-A-Licious Mix" of "Cannon" as shallow and unsatisfying to listen standalone. Since 2024, Mahaffey has stated that Self Goes Shopping was made simply to confuse and amuse concert audiences, and not a serious release.

== Track listing ==
All tracks are written by Matt Mahaffey.

No.	Title	Original release	Length
1.	"Sassy Britches" (Kung-Pow Mix)	The Half-Baked Serenade (1997)	3:53
2.	"Cannon" (Rave-A-Licious Mix)	Subliminal Plastic Motives (1995)	1:39
3.	"Fliptop Box" (Super Mario Mix)	Brunch (1999)	3:51
4.	"Crimes on Paper" (David Sanborn Mix)	The Half-Baked Serenade	2:53
5.	"So Low" (Banjo Kazooie Mix)	Subliminal Plastic Motives	2:51
6.	"Uno Song" (Billy Joel Mix)	Breakfast with Girls (1999)	3:11
Total length:			18:18

== Personnel ==
Credits are adapted from the EP's MP3 metadata.

- Matt Mahaffey – vocals, instruments, production, audio mixing, arrangement
- Mike Mahaffey – vocals, production, arrangement
- Brad Ross-MacLeod – album artwork
