= Ornament & Crime =

2017 album by Self delayed for 14 years

Studio album by Self
- Released: August 25, 2017
- Recorded: March 2001 – January 8, 2004
- Studios: Royaltone (North Hollywood); Crackertracks (Studio City); Larrabee (Los Angeles)
- Genres: Alternative rock; power pop; garage rock; pop-punk; new wave
- Length: 38:46
- Label: El Camino Media

Self chronology
Super Fake Nice (2014)	Ornament & Crime (2017)

Singles from Ornament & Crime
- 1. "Grow Up" Released: June 13, 2003

Ornament & Crime is the fifth studio album by the American pop rock band Self (stylized as sElf). Originally planned for release in June 2003, it was delayed and completed in January 2004, before being indefinitely shelved with the folding of DreamWorks Records into Universal Music Group. The album leaked multiple times after its cancellation on peer-to-peer file sharing networks like LimeWire, followed by the release of its B-sides as Porno, Mint & Grime (2005) and a band hiatus until late 2012. El Camino Media later announced an official issue of the album on vinyl and CD, which was released on August 25, 2017, nearly 17 years after their previous studio album Gizmodgery (2000).

Upon release, Ornament & Crime was met with favorable to mixed reviews. It was praised for its instrumentation and compared to Self's debut album Subliminal Plastic Motives (1995), but sometimes labeled as more commercialized than their recent efforts. The song "Grow Up" was released on June 13, 2003 as the album's lead single, while "Out with a Bang" appeared in various films, including Evolution (2001) and a Guinness World Record-awarded Team Fortress 2 machinima. Self would enter a second band hiatus soon after the album's release.

== Background ==
In September 2000, Self released their fourth studio album, Gizmodgery, through Spongebath Records, which had published or co-published the band's entire discography up to that point. Spongebath was shut down in 2001 due to a lack of sales and major label interest, though Self maintained a distribution deal with DreamWorks Records. To be closer to the label, the band moved from Murfreesboro, Tennessee, to Los Angeles, California. Frontman Matt Mahaffey subsequently planned a rock approach harkening back to their debut album Subliminal Plastic Motives (1995) for their next album.

== Writing and production ==
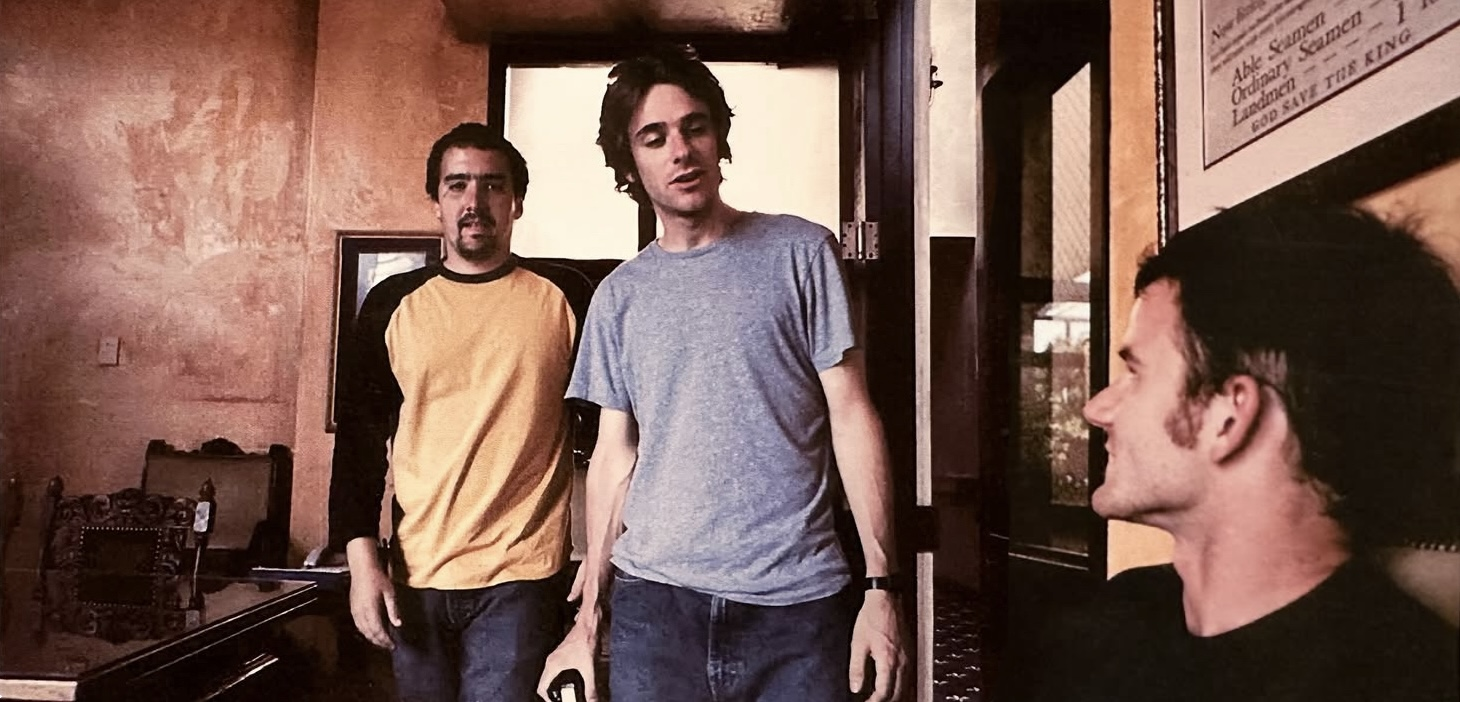
Rawlings, Mahaffey and Burrus during the recording of Ornament & Crime in 2002.

Self began writing their fifth album by March 2001. Mahaffey prominently used Pro Tools during the recording process, limiting analog use for drums and some guitars. The first song recorded was "Out with a Bang", appearing in the 2001 sci-fi comedy film Evolution. It was written for its ending after a meeting with director Ivan Reitman. Absent from any soundtrack album, the song could only be heard in the film. The song "Emotional" was produced second as Self began sorting through a collection of 35 demos for the album. Four were recorded through two weeks in late July 2002: "Insecure Sober", "No One Knows You", "Hellbent", and "Grow Up". Further sessions were done in late September for "Coming Over", "Can't Go On", "The Pounding Truth", and an unnamed fourth song.

Throughout the album's development, various stylistic changes were requested by DreamWorks due to the label's desire to present Self as a modern rock band, comparable to Weezer, requesting "something for the radio". Its lyrical content was attenuated, and keyboard components were stripped back, described by Mahaffey as "a love letter to KROQ". It cost approximately $650 thousand ($1.14 million in 2025) to make the album. While producing it, the band titled the project Ornament & Crime after a Los Angeles clothing boutique of the same name. Recording was initially projected to be finished in December 2002.

== Marketing ==
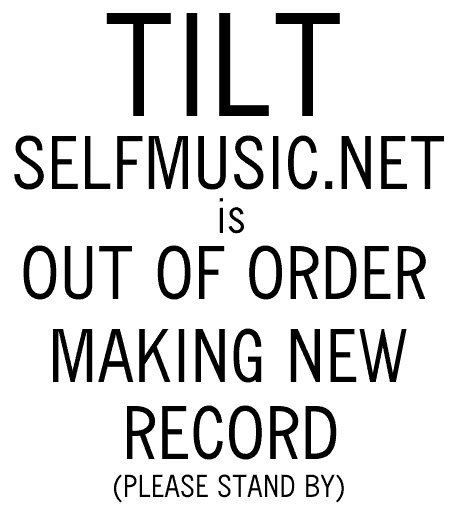
Self's main website displayed a single "out of order" message from August 2002—May 2003.

Early in the album's development, a Summer 2001 release date was speculated. On January 28, 2002, Self launched a website for posting new songs and band updates, with the track "Busy Sending Me" becoming available upon launch. In May 2003, Self updated their website with branding to reflect Ornament & Crime, featuring a red fingerprint embellished with the band name. DreamWorks partnered with Streetwise Concepts and Coke to release "Grow Up" on June 13, issued on a sampler album as the album's sole single. Ornament & Crime was originally scheduled for release on June 3, 2003, though DreamWorks Records later updated their schedule for August 19, followed by another delay to March 3, 2004, to accommodate newer material. During this time, multiple videos detailing the recording process were uploaded to the band's website. On September 18, 2003, Self performed various songs from the album at The Echo in Los Angeles.

In a retrospective interview with Alternative Press regarding Ornament & Crime, Mahaffey stated that "the label folded the night after we finished it". On November 11, 2003, DreamWorks announced the sale of their company to Universal Music Group for $100 million ($175 million in 2025), which was finalized on January 9, 2004. Universal's executives believed that the album would commercially underperform, cancelling it and leaving the album indefinitely unreleased. The band continued uploading demos to their website until early 2004, followed by a performance as Britt Daniel's opening act on April 17. On April 14, 2005, Self released their third compilation album, Porno, Mint & Grime. which included all of the scrapped demos posted to their website. It would be the band's final release until their reunion with the extended play Super Fake Nice (2014). The Duluth News Tribune retrospectively compared the compilation to Psalm One's Woman at Work series, citing a wide range of style and genres.

== Leaks and release ==
Cover artwork used for the album in leaks and later by Self prior to its official release.

After Ornament & Crime's delay was announced to fans, a demo version of the album was leaked online on the blogging website LiveJournal in mid–2004. Unofficial track titles were applied by fans, leading the song "How Can I Make You Happy?" to be known as "Mermaid". Mahaffey initially discouraged the leaks, asking fans to wait for an official release. While it remained unreleased, the album was only legally available via streaming on Self's MySpace and YouTube channels. Fan artwork by Rafe Heltsley was created using the band's website graphics, which received widespread circulation and was thereafter used by Self to represent Ornament & Crime's unreleased version. A second version of the album was later leaked on the peer-to-peer network LimeWire. In April 2006, a remix of "The Pounding Truth" by Prefontaine was shared on MySpace.

In 2017, Mahaffey began composing the score of the animated television series Rise of the Teenage Mutant Ninja Turtles, co-developed by Andy Suriano. During their partnership, Mahaffey selected some of Suriano's illustrations published in 2008 and adapted them into cover artwork for his album, adding the title as text on top. On June 9, independent record label El Camino Media opened pre-orders of Ornament & Crime, announcing a summer release date. The album was officially released on August 25 as a limited-edition vinyl, with autographed copies being sold as ticket bundles for WRLT's Ellison Place Street Festival. Since its release, Self has stagnated on music output. On October 24, 2025, the album was published to streaming services in celebration of Subliminal Plastic Motives' 30th anniversary.

== Reception ==
Stephen Trageser of Nashville Scene praised the song "No One Knows You", describing the combination of rock styling and catchy hooks as a standout of the band's discography. Gabe Besecker of Woof Magazine noted its simpler instrumentation as more focused, commending the stripped-back style. Gerald Dih of AudioPhix highlighted "How Can I Make You Happy?" for its adaptation of Madonna's "Material Girl", comparing the album's alternative rock style to the band's debut, Subliminal Plastic Motives (1995). He additionally complimented other songs' lyricism and vocal performances, but found it to lack the quirk present in Breakfast with Girls (1999). In a separate review, Dih lauded the song "Out with a Bang" as a "high-energy alt-rock anthem", describing its intense guitar bridge as fit for TikTok trends.

=== Usage in media ===
"Hi Kitty0706 fans! Very sorry to hear of his passing. My name is Matt. I wrote, produced, and sang this song. I'm glad you stopped by to listen to it."

— Matt Mahaffey (@mamorymoog)

The song "The Pounding Truth" was used in commercials promoting the third generation Chrysler Sebring, while "Out with a Bang" is featured in the intro of the Team Fortress 2 machinima Team Fabulous 2 by Kitty0706. It garnered over 17 million views by February 2016, receiving an award from Guinness World Records for being the "Most watched Team Fortress machinima on YouTube". Kitty0706, whose real name was Colin Wyckoff, died on January 25, 2015. Mahaffey shared his condolences on a reupload of the track on YouTube in 2021, thanking viewers for listening to it.

== Track listing ==
All tracks are written by Matt Mahaffey, except where noted.

No.	Title	Writer(s)	Length
1.	"Hellbent"		3:07
2.	"Emotional"		3:25
3.	"Insecure Sober"	Matt Mahaffey; Mac Burrus	2:22
4.	"Pathetic Song"		3:20
5.	"How Can I Make You Happy?"		3:11
6.	"Can't Go On"		4:05
7.	"Coming Over"		3:56
8.	"No One Knows You"		2:42
9.	"Grow Up"		3:21
10.	"The Pounding Truth"		3:17
11.	"Out with a Bang"		3:25
12.	"L.A. Radio"	Mahaffey; Burrus; Mike Mahaffey; Gary Welch	2:29
Total length:			38:46

Notes

- On streaming services, "How Can I Make You Happy?" is stylized without a question mark, "No One Knows You" as "No One Knows", "The Pounding Truth" as "Pounding Truth", and "L.A. Radio" as "La Radio".
- "Emotional" was titled "(Emo)tional" and "Out with a Bang" as simply "Bang!" on Mini CD singles handed to DreamWorks executives and band associates.

== Personnel ==
Credits are adapted from the album's liner notes.

Musicians

- Matt Mahaffey – vocals, guitar, drums, piano, various instruments
- Jason Rawlings – drums
- Mac Burrus – performer (12), bass
- Mike Mahaffey – guitar, vocals
- Chris James – piano
- Geoff Gallegos – strings, horns
- Gary Welch – performer (12)

Technical

- Robert Carranza – engineer
- Rich Costey – mixing engineer
- Mario Caldato Jr. – production (1–3, 8, 9, 11), assistant engineer
- Mickey Petralia – production (4–7, 10), assistant engineer
- Matt Mahaffey – production (12), assistant engineer
- Chris James – assistant engineer
- Dan Leffler – assistant mixing engineer
- Andy Suriano – artwork

== Release history ==
Release dates and formats
Region	Date	Format(s)	Label	Ref.
Various	August 25, 2017	CD; vinyl LP	El Camino	

== See also ==
- Grow Up and Blow Away (2007), an album by the Canadian indie rock band Metric which suffered a similar fate as Ornament & Crime and has been compared to Self by Pitchfork.
