= Out with a Bang (Self song) =

2017 song by Self

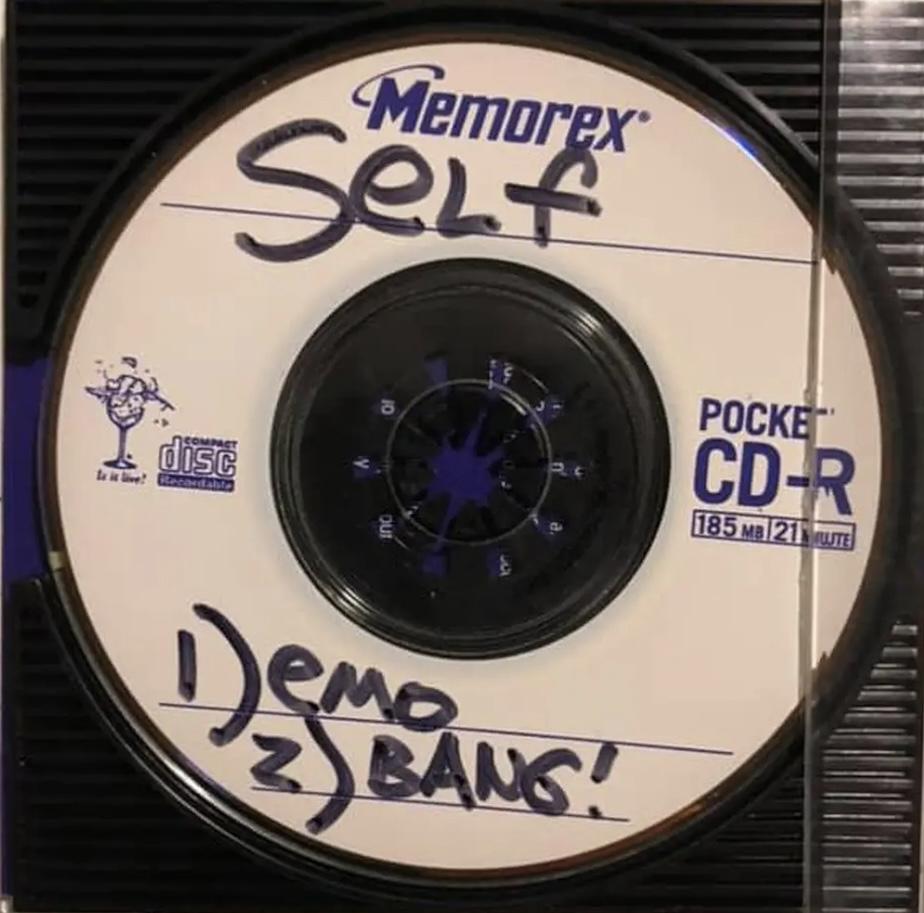
- Mini CD single distributed by Matt Mahaffey

Promotional single by Self

from the album Ornament & Crime
- A-side: "Emotional"
- Released: August 25, 2017
- Recorded: March 2001–2002
- Studio: Larrabee (Los Angeles)
- Genre: Alternative rock; pop-punk
- Length: 3:25
- Label: El Camino
- Songwriter: Matt Mahaffey
- Producer: Mario Caldato Jr.

Audio
- "Out with a Bang" on YouTube

"Out with a Bang" is a song by the American pop rock band Self, released on August 25, 2017. It appears as the eleventh track on their fifth studio album Ornament & Crime (2017), distributed through El Camino Media. The song lyrically adapts the spy comedy film Spies Like Us (1985), instrumentally backed by energetic alternative rock music with pop-punk influence. "Out with a Bang" appeared in the film Evolution (2001) and the Team Fortress 2 machinima Team Fabulous 2 (2012), boosting its popularity online before its official release.

== Background ==
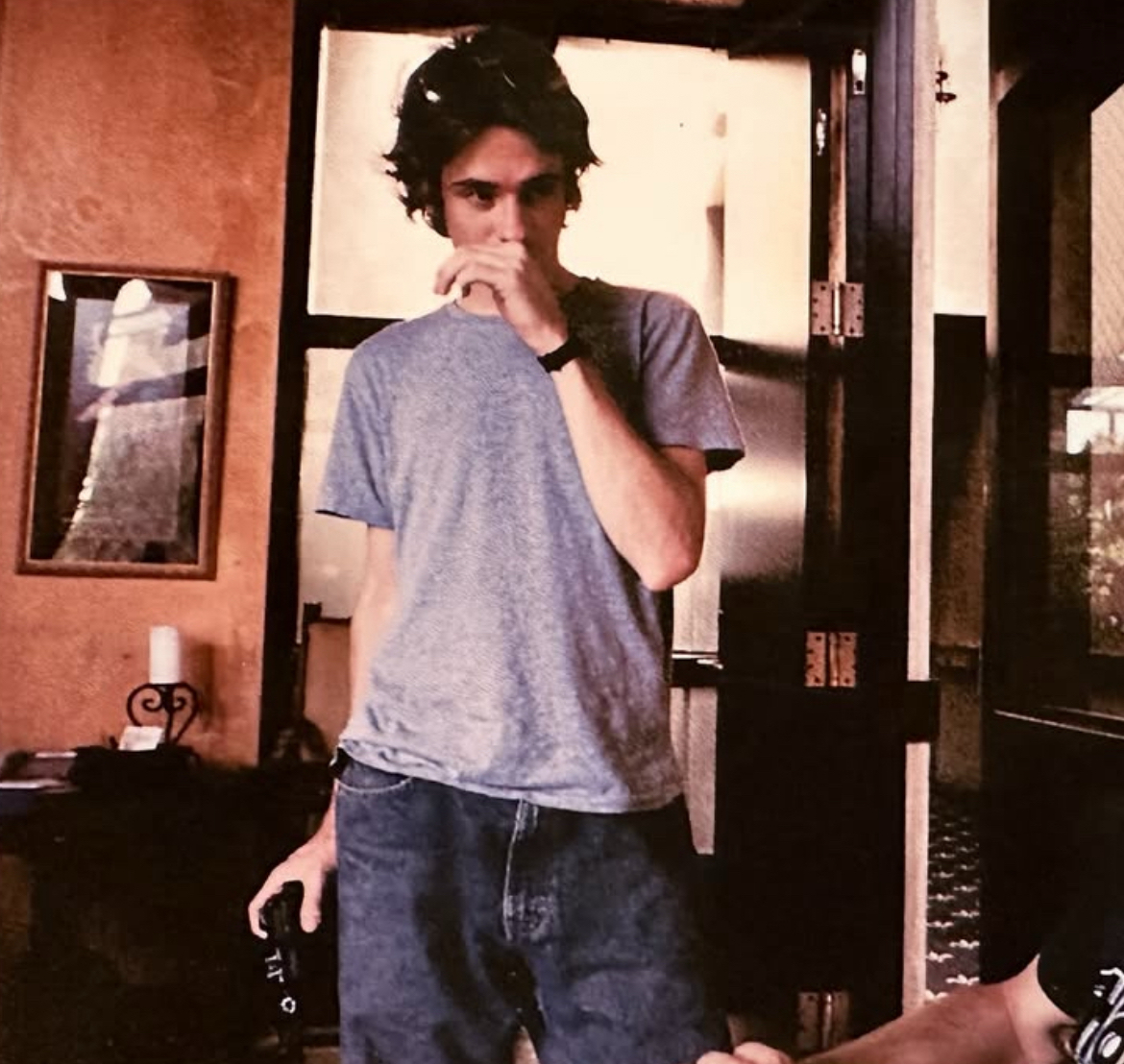
Matt Mahaffey during the recording of Ornament & Crime in 2002.

After the release of Self's third studio album Breakfast with Girls (1999) on DreamWorks Records, lead member Matt Mahaffey and pianist Chris James moved to Los Angeles in 2000 to be closer to the label, while bassist Mac Burrus moved nearby to San Diego. Mahaffey was subsequently offered soundtracking work for the label's film division. The first of these was the song "Stay Home", appearing in the animated fantasy comedy film Shrek (2001). He was then invited to a meeting with director Ivan Reitman, offering to produce music for his sci-fi comedy film Evolution (2001). Mahaffey wrote the song "Out with a Bang" for it, which appeared in the film's end credits. Evolution never received an official soundtrack album, leading the song to be unavailable outside the film. Mahaffey correspondingly encouraged fans to watch the film to listen to the song, while Burrus assured fans that "Out with a Bang" would "eventually make its way to some medium".

== Release ==
Self's fifth studio album, Ornament & Crime, was first speculated to be released in summer 2001, though Mahaffey stated in June that the album was still "in progress" with no confirmed release date. By July 2002, "Out with a Bang" had been re-recorded from its demo and added to the album, a project which was designed to appeal to the radio by request of DreamWorks. Ornament & Crime was planned to release on March 3, 2004, though in a retrospective interview with Alternative Press regarding the album, Mahaffey stated that "the label folded the night after we finished it". The sale of DreamWorks Records to Universal Music Group for $100 million ($175 million in 2025) was announced on November 11, 2003, and finalized on January 9.

Universal's executives did not believe the album would be profitable to release, cancelling the album and leaving it unreleased. Ornament & Crime was indefinitely delayed, later leaking online via LiveJournal shortly after the announcement, with a second leak occurring on LimeWire thereafter. Following the death of guitarist Mike Mahaffey in 2005, the band entered hiatus. Matt Mahaffey later made "Out with a Bang" available for download on his MySpace, while Ornament & Crime was eventually released on August 25, 2017, by El Camino Media.

== Reception ==
"Hi Kitty0706 fans! Very sorry to hear of his passing. My name is Matt. I wrote, produced, and sang this song. I'm glad you stopped by to listen to it."

— Matt Mahaffey (@mamorymoog)

In 2012, "Out with a Bang" was featured in the intro of the Team Fortress 2 machinima Team Fabulous 2 by Kitty0706, gaining popularity online through the Team Fortress 2 community. By February 2016, it had received over 17 million views, gaining an award from Guinness World Records for being the "Most watched Team Fortress machinima on YouTube". Kitty0706, whose real name was Colin Wyckoff, died on January 25, 2015. Mahaffey shared his condolences on a reupload of the track on YouTube in 2021, thanking viewers for listening to it. Writing for AudioPhix, Gerald Dih praised the song as "perfect for punchy, action-driven videos" and speculating it would be picked up and reach further virality on TikTok, comparing it to music by the American bands Vulfpeck and Glass Beach.

== Personnel ==
Credits adapted from the album's liner notes.

Musicians

- Matt Mahaffey – vocals, guitar, drums, piano, various instruments
- Jason Rawlings – drums
- Mac Burrus – bass
- Mike Mahaffey – guitar, vocals
- Chris James – piano
- Geoff Gallegos – strings, horns

Technical

- Robert Carranza – engineer
- Rich Costey – mixing engineer
- Mario Caldato Jr. – production, assistant engineer
- Mickey Petralia – assistant engineer
- Matt Mahaffey – assistant engineer
- Chris James – assistant engineer
- Dan Leffler – assistant mixing engineer
