= Grow Up (Self song) =

2003 single by Self

- Digital single artwork illustrated by Azarath

Single by Self

from the album Ornament & Crime
- Released: June 13, 2003
- Recorded: July 17–30, 2002
- Studio: Royaltone (North Hollywood)
- Genre: Alternative rock; power pop
- Length: 3:21
- Label: DreamWorks; El Camino
- Songwriter: Matt Mahaffey
- Producer: Mario Caldato Jr.

Self singles chronology
| "Stay Home" (2001) | "Grow Up" (2003) | "Could You Love Me Now?" (2010) |

Audio
- "Grow Up" on YouTube

"Grow Up" is a song by the American pop rock band Self, released on June 13, 2003, via DreamWorks Records as the lead single of their fifth studio album, Ornament & Crime. The song is built around a fast rhythmic section, lyrically centering on an obsessive protagonist repeatedly calling his ex-girlfriend until she threatens to call the police. Although not liked by frontman Matt Mahaffey himself, critics highlighted the song's dark humor and energy.

Ornament & Crime was intended to be released through DreamWorks Records, but was shelved once the label folded into Universal Music Group. "Grow Up" was subsequently the band's final release through the label and their final single until "Could You Love Me Now?" in 2010.

== Production ==
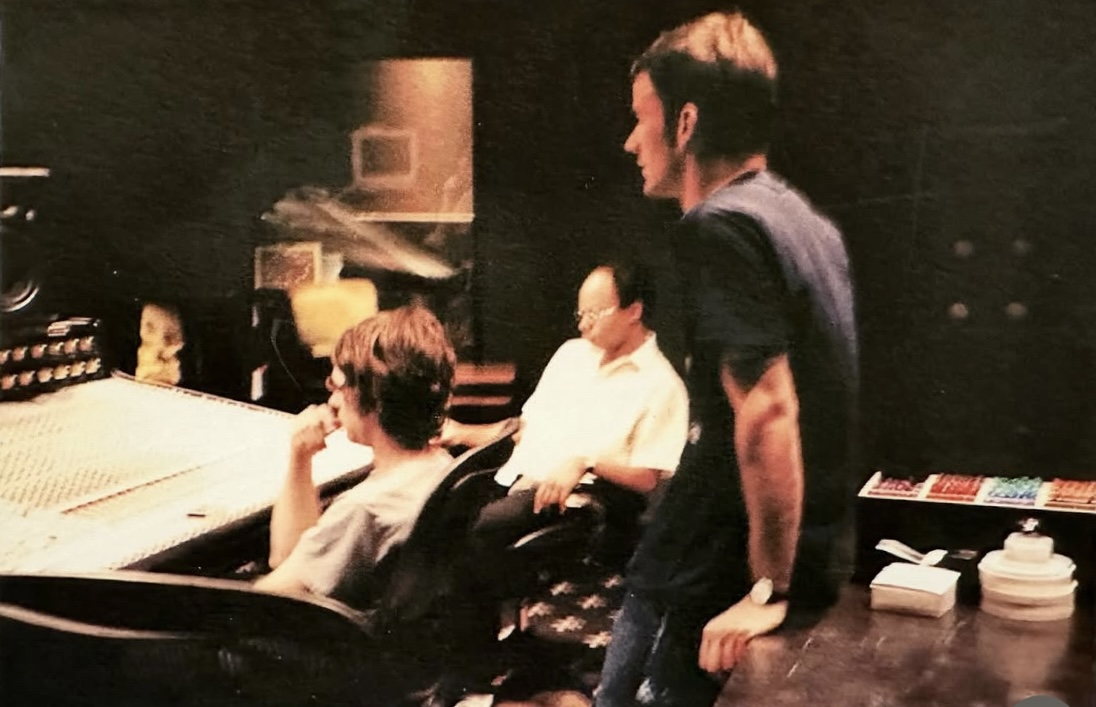
Self during the recording of Ornament & Crime in 2002.

In May 2000, American musician Matt Mahaffey moved to Los Angeles to be closer to DreamWorks Records, the label his band Self was signed to, and began writing new music and constructing a home studio by September. In March 2001, Self announced that they had begun recording for their fifth studio album, speculated for a summer release. By July 2002, Self had recorded 35 demos for the album, including "Emotional" and "Out with a Bang" as completed songs. At the Royaltone studio in North Hollywood, the band began recording four more songs on July 17. The song "The Pounding Truth" was originally intended for these sessions, though it was replaced by "Grow Up", whose recording was finished by July 30. During production, Self taped video footage of themselves making the song, including its vocal harmonies, and featured band member Chris James playing its organ and piano. This footage was later published online via the band's website.

== Composition ==
"Grow Up"
An 30-second sample of "Grow Up" by Self, where the third chorus is heard.

Lyrically, "Grow Up" features a protagonist who declares he will "change" for the better from undesirable traits, repeatedly calling his ex-girlfriend until she threatens to call the police. He continues regardless, searching for a solution in the American romantic comedy drama show Sex and the City and promising that he's about to grow up. The song follows a tempo of 140 beats per minute and a time signature of 4/4, using a verse–chorus form. "Grow Up" runs for 116 bars with a few seconds of silence at the end for the instruments to fade, resulting in a duration of 3 minutes and 21 seconds. It additionally features an instrumental intro and a guitar break, using guitars, keyboards, and drums that follow a consistent pace.

== Release and reception ==
"Grow Up" was released on June 13, 2003, as part of a sampler album released by DreamwWorks Records in partnership with Streetwise Concepts and Coke. It was marketed as the lead single for Self's then-upcoming fifth studio album Ornament & Crime. In 2004, "Grow Up" received artwork by Self's graphic designer "Azarath" (L.M. Lorady). DreamWorks Records folded the night after the band finished the album, being sold to Universal Music Group. The label's executives cancelled the album in fear that it would commercially underperform, leaving it indefinitely unreleased.

In a 2004 interview on the Middle Tennessee State University student-run college radio station WMTS-FM, Mahaffey voiced his displeasure with the song, stating: "That's actually one of my least favorite songs on the album, that's why we kinda put it out there". Until Ornament & Crime was issued through El Camino Media in 2017, "Grow Up" was the only officially released song from the album. Gerald Dih of AudioPhix praised the song for its "spiraling stalker of a narrator assisted by an intensifying backdrop" and drew comparisons between it and They Might Be Giants' "All The Lazy Boyfriends".

== Personnel ==
Credits are adapted from the album's liner notes.

Musicians

- Matt Mahaffey – vocals, guitar, drums, piano, various instruments
- Jason Rawlings – drums
- Mac Burrus – bass
- Mike Mahaffey – guitar, vocals
- Chris James – piano

Technical

- Robert Carranza – engineer
- Rich Costey – mixing engineer
- Mario Caldato Jr. – production, assistant engineer
- Matt Mahaffey – assistant engineer
- Chris James – assistant engineer
- Dan Leffler – assistant mixing engineer
