= Trunk Fulla Amps =

2001 single by Self

Single by Self

from the album Gizmodgery
- Released: 1999
- Studio: Bennett House (Franklin)
- Genre: Alternative rock; power pop; bossa nova
- Length: 3:24, 3:20 (single), 3:26 (edit)
- Label: Spongebath
- Songwriters: Matt Mahaffey; Mike Mahaffey; Jason Rawlings; Mac Burrus; Chris James
- Producers: Matt Mahaffey; Chris James

Self singles chronology
"Meg Ryan" (1999)	"Trunk Fulla Amps" (1999)	"Stay Home" (2001)

Music video
- "Trunk Fulla Amps" on YouTube

"Trunk Fulla Amps" is a song by the American pop rock band Self, released on September 5, 2000, via Spongebath Records as the fifth track of their fourth studio album, Gizmodgery. The song is built around repetition, with variations referencing and emulating other musicians. In 1999, it was marketed as the album's lead single and received a music video the same year. Critics praised the song's humor, energy, and arrangements, highlighting it as a common fan favorite.

== Composition ==
"Trunk Fulla Amps" lyrically consists of "I got a trunk fulla amps, motherfucker" repeated through its length. Four repetitions have the line's beginning replaced with a musical artist, followed by emulating an archetype of them for the first half of the final word. These inclusions are Freddie Mercury, ELO, Glenn Danzig, and Lenny Kravitz. In the song's clean version, the second half of "motherfucker" is replaced with a playful "ooh" or muted altogether. Instrumentally, the song is alternative rock with elements of power pop, reliant on a constant guitar rhythm. Following the theme of its origin album, Gizmodgery (2000), the song exclusively uses toy instruments. For its bridge, the song switches to an uptempo bossa nova arrangement, described by Spencer Owen of Pitchfork to have Brazilian influence. While producing "Trunk Fulla Amps", Self experienced issues with the song's bass being absent in all recordings. Band members Matt Mahaffey and Chris James resolved it in the mixing process.

== Release ==
During shows surrounding the release of Breakfast with Girls (1999), Self would perform "Trunk Fulla Amps" as a preview of their next album. In 1999, a music video directed by Reed Ridley was published for the song, featuring the band members performing and having a party. It was created to air on MTV's "Indie Day", but Self was denied broadcasting due to their previous association with DreamWorks Records. "Trunk Fulla Amps" was released through Spongebath Records on September 5, 2000, as the fifth track of Gizmodgery, Self's fourth studio album. A clean version of the song was placed at the end of the album, while physical copies were packaged with parental advisory stickers on the front due to the song's prevalent swearing. The band stated plans to create a Gizmodgery DVD containing the album alongside interviews, photos, and the video for "Trunk Fulla Amps". The song was also featured in the final season of the American television series Weeds.

== Reception ==
Andrew Shaw of The Daily Nebraskan commended Mahaffey's recognizable imitation of each artist mentioned in the song, stating that "his abilities shine on the track". Bill Ribas of NY Rock ranked it as his favorite of the album, likening its style to David Bowie's album Scary Monsters (and Super Creeps) (1980). Samuel Barker of RockZone called it Gizmodgery's catchiest track, appreciating its beat and lyricism. Spencer Owen of Pitchfork classed "Trunk Fulla Amps" as the album's highlight, lauding its lively vocal performance and bossa nova bridge.

Mark Woodlief of CMJ complimented the song's "deliciously unexpected" bridge, comparing its pulsating bass to American rock band Local H. J Noise of Hybrid Magazine extensively praised "Trunk Fulla Amps", picking out its humor and danceability as aspects that could make it "a monster club hit" for collegiate fraternities and general American life. However, Noise suggested that the song should've been a B-side to "Dead Man", another song from Gizmodgery, rather than a standalone single. Scott Hefflon of Lollipop Magazine admired the track's snappy energy, rating it as one of the album's best tunes.

== Track listing ==
"Trunk Fulla Amps" CD single
No.	Title	Writer(s)	Length
1.	"Trunk Fulla Amps" (radio edit)	Matt Mahaffey; Mike Mahaffey; Jason Rawlings; Mac Burrus; Chris James	3:20

"Trunk Fulla Amps" Spongebath sampler
No.	Title	Writer(s)	Length
1.	"Trunk Fulla Amps" (early version) (performed by Self)	Mahaffey; Mahaffey; Rawlings; Burrus; James	3:20
2.	"Valerie's Revenge" (performed by Call Florence Pow)	Brian Jacobs; David Tobias	2:15
3.	"Do It" (performed by Knodel)	Knodel	2:21
4.	"Trunk Fulla Amps" (edit) (performed by Self)	Mahaffey; Mahaffey; Rawlings; Burrus; James	3:26

== Personnel ==
Credits adapted from the album's liner notes.

Self

- Matt Mahaffey – lead vocals, instruments, production
- Mike Mahaffey – instruments
- Jason Rawlings – instruments
- Mac Burrus – instruments
- Chris James – mixing engineer, production

Technical

- Tom Baker – mastering engineer
- Shawn McLean – engineer
