= Selfafornia =

Compilation album by Self
- Released: July 27, 2001
- Recorded: 1994–2001
- Studios: Bennett House (Franklin); Ocean Way (Nashville); Mahaffey's House (Murfreesboro); Treasure Isle (Nashville)
- Genres: Alternative rock; folktronica; power pop; shoegaze; chiptune
- Length: 29:19
- Label: Spongebath Records
- Producers: Matt Mahaffey; Michael Simpson; Todd Kinnon (uncredited)

Self chronology
Self Goes Shopping (2000)	Selfafornia (2001)	Porno, Mint & Grime (2005)

Selfafornia is the second compilation album by the American pop rock band Self, published by Spongebath Records. Intermittently released in portions beginning in Spring 2001, the album was available via Spongebath's website as a free internet download, with its final songs being uploaded on July 27, 2001. It includes songs scrapped from Self's third and fourth studio albums, Breakfast with Girls (1999) and Gizmodgery (2000), alongside other demos and alternative remixes.

Selfafornia was met with generally positive reviews from critics, with most praising band frontman Matt Mahaffey's songwriting ability and the album's musical variety. Following the September 11 attacks in the United States, the song "America", which expresses embarrassment over patriotism, was removed from the album's download page over concerns of insensitivity. As of 2026, Selfafornia has never been made available on streaming services.

== Production ==
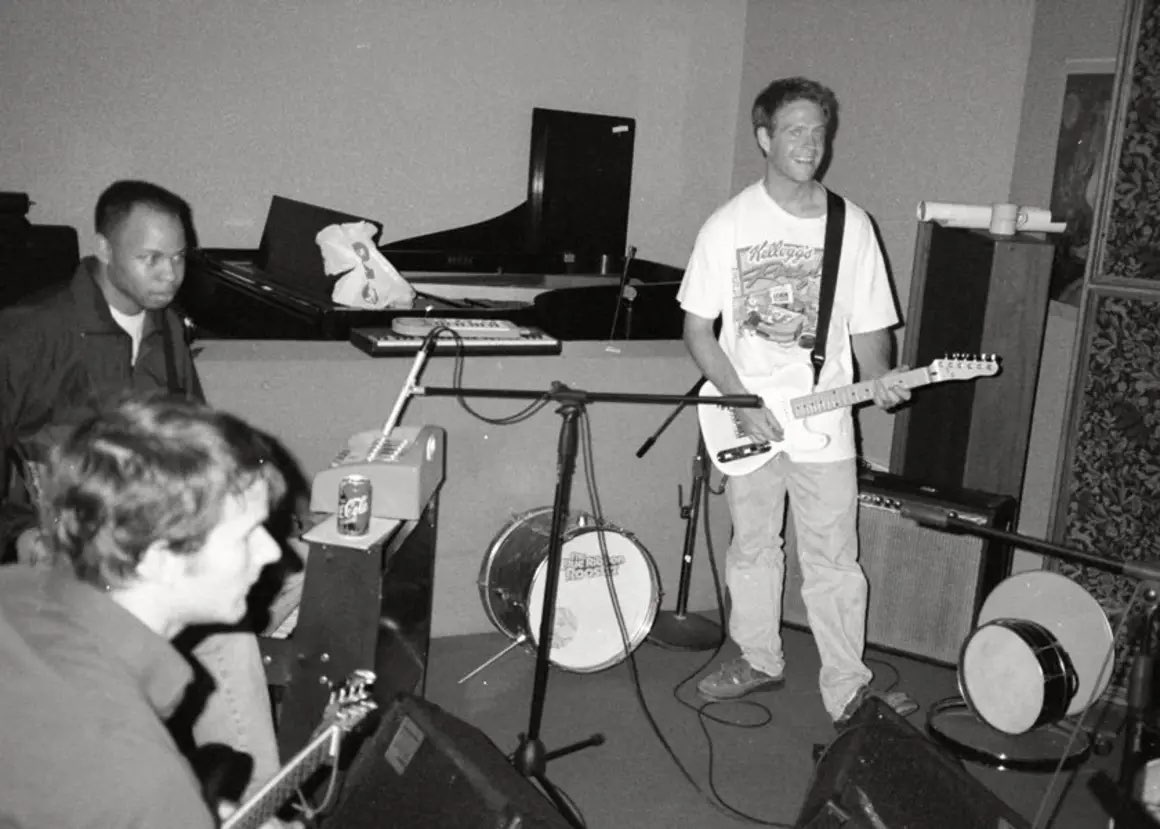
Self during the recording of Breakfast with Girls in 1998.

During the creation of Self's third and fourth albums, Breakfast with Girls (1999) and Gizmodgery (2000), frontman Matt Mahaffey wrote the song "Suzie Q Sailaway". He recorded the song with toy instruments for the latter album but was requested by DreamWorks Records to put the song on the former. Mahaffey subsequently re-recorded the song with a full band, stating that he didn't want any toy recordings outside of Gizmodgery. This process delayed the release of Breakfast with Girls, which, combined with the song's shift in style, led to a retroactive dissatisfaction with it.

In November 1997, Michael Simpson of the Dust Brothers began mixing Self's then upcoming album Breakfast with Girls, creating a remix of the toy recording of "Suzie Q Sailaway". Mahaffey preferred this remix to the original version, stating a wish to use it on a future album. Mahaffey later met Ken Andrews of Failure through a mutual friend, hiring him as an engineer for Breakfast with Girls. The two additionally recorded three songs together in April 1998, including "Shelf Life" and "Wednesday Again". "Baby, Can You Dig Your Man?" is an adaptation of a fictional song created by Larry Underwood, a character in the post-apocalyptic dark fantasy novel The Stand (1978), written by American author Stephen King, which is considered Underwood's breakout hit.

== Release ==
Selfafornia was intermittently released in portions through Spongebath Records beginning in Spring 2001, with the final set of songs releasing on July 27, 2001. Available as a free internet download, it contains nine songs in MP3 format, primarily from the writing sessions of Gizmodgery, and Breakfast with Girls. Spongebath Records would close its doors shortly after its release of Selfafornia in late 2001. The track "See If You Swim" was featured in volume 9 of the Japanese pop fanzine Kheer in April 2001, and was later included on Self's third compilation album Porno, Mint & Grime, released on April 14, 2005. "Resurrect" was additionally included on Selfafornia's download page, previously released as a part of the Japanese edition of Gizmodgery. Shortly after the September 11 attacks, the track "America" was removed from the album's download page.

== Reception ==
Laurent of Indiepoprock complimented the compilation's sound, describing it as encapsulating the band's bright and quirky instrumentation amidst a low budget. Gerald Dih of AudioPhix described the song "America" as having an intentionally "jarring, unsettled quality", calling its "bitter mockery of clichés" and departure from the rest of the album's sound as highlighting Mahaffey's wit and comparing it to the Gizmodgery tracks "5 Alive" and "Chameleon".

== Track listing ==
All tracks are written by Matt Mahaffey except where noted.

No.	Title	Writer(s)	Length
1.	"See If You Swim"		3:20
2.	"Wednesday Again"	Mahaffey; Ken Andrews	3:29
3.	"America"		1:08
4.	"Shelf Life"	Mahaffey; Andrews; Seth Timbs	3:42
5.	"Waiting"		3:03
6.	"Anything is Impossible"		3:57
7.	"Baby, Can You Dig Your Man?"	Larry Underwood; Timbs	4:04
8.	"Puppy Love"	Mahaffey; Timbs	3:47
9.	"Suzie Q Sailaway" (Mike Simpson Toy Mix)	Matt Mahaffey; Mike Mahaffey; Mac Burrus; Chris James; Jason Rawlings	2:49
Total length:			29:19

== Personnel ==
Credits adapted from liner notes.

- Matt Mahaffey – guitar, vocals, drums, production
- Seth Timbs – piano, vocals
- Ken Andrews – guitar (2-4), vocals (2)
- Mike Mahaffey – guitar, backing vocals
- Chris James – piano
- Mac Burrus – bass
- Jason Dietz – bass
- Swan Burrus – backing vocals
- Jason Rawlings – drums
- Michael Simpson – production, mixing
- Neil Dietz – drum technician
- Todd Kinnon – mastering (1–4, uncredited)
- Brad Ross-MacLeod – artwork (uncredited)
