= Brunch (EP) =

1999 extended play by Self

EP by Self
- Released: c. September 23, 1999
- Recorded: September 1997–1998
- Genres: Art rock; space age pop
- Length: 12:16
- Labels: DreamWorks; Spongebath
- Producer: Matt Mahaffey

Self chronology
Breakfast with Girls (1999)	Brunch (1999)	Gizmodgery (2000)

Brunch (stylized as Brunch B-Sides) is the first extended play by the American pop rock band Self, released around September 23, 1999, (Note: Contemporary sources mention Brunch would be "in stores" by September 23, but do not mention the exact release date.) through DreamWorks Records and Spongebath Records. It consists of cut tracks from Self's third studio album, Breakfast with Girls (1999). It received a limited physical release, which was met with positive reception.

== Background ==
During the production of Self's third album, Breakfast with Girls (1999), frontman Matt Mahaffey wrote and produced nineteen songs. The band's label gradually reduced this to thirteen tracks to improve marketability and the album's listening experience. Three of these scrapped songs were compiled to create the extended play Brunch. "Fliptop Box" discusses Mahaffey's smoking addiction, which was written in an unsuccessful attempt to quit. "Crashing Parties" uses synthesizer-reliant space age pop instrumentation, while "Happy Accidents" follows an art rock style likened by Bryan Tilford of Ink 19 to XTC's music. "Fliptop Box" was first performed by Self as early as late 1996, including a performance at the McNeil Room in Troy, New York. "Crashing Parties" was simply entitled "Parties" by Mahaffey prior to its official release.

== Release ==
Marketed as a limited edition release, Brunch was released by DreamWorks Records and Spongebath Records, around September 23, 1999. It was originally meant to be included alongside Breakfast with Girls upon its release, but was not due to it still being manufactured at the time. Brunch was later given to fans who pre-ordered the album as consolation, bundled together alongside a puffy sticker. 5,000 units of the EP were produced, with a portion of these available for sale on its own at select retailers. Brunch sold out within its first week, with the band consequently referring to songs from the EP as "from our CD that's available on eBay" during live performances.

All three songs featured on Brunch were later released on the double vinyl release of Breakfast with Girls, and later made available for digital download on Spongebath's website alongside Self's first compilation album, Feels Like Breakin' Shit (1998). An acoustic version of "Fliptop Box" was made available for download on October 5, 2000, followed by a chiptune remix of the song based on the Super Mario game franchise that was included on Self's second extended play, Self Goes Shopping (2000). Initially planned for distribution via DreamWorks, the remix was released for free on Spongebath's website. Brunch has never been made available on streaming services.

== Reception ==
Bryan Tilford of Ink 19 reviewed Brunch positively, complimenting the inventive sampling of "Fliptop Box" and highlighting the lyricism of "Happy Accidents" as reminiscent of Andy Partridge's sarcasm. He praised the EP's worth as essential to Breakfast with Girls, calling the songs "too genius for their mother disc".

== Track listing ==
All tracks are written by Matt Mahaffey.

No.	Title	Length
1.	"Fliptop Box"	3:45
2.	"Crashing Parties"	4:22
3.	"Happy Accidents"	4:09
Total length:		12:16

Notes

- "Fliptop Box" is sometimes stylized as "Flip-Top Box."

== Personnel ==
Credits adapted from the EP's back notes.

- Matt Mahaffey – lead vocals, instruments, production
- Chris James – mixing engineer
