= Paint by Numbers =

1998 single by Self

Single by Self

from the album Breakfast with Girls
- Released: July 21, 1998
- Recorded: 1998
- Studio: Bennett House (Franklin)
- Genre: Power pop; surf rock
- Length: 3:07
- Label: DreamWorks; Spongebath
- Songwriter: Matt Mahaffey
- Producer: Matt Mahaffey

Self singles chronology
"So Low" (1996)	"Paint by Numbers" (1998)	"Meg Ryan" (1999)

Audio
- "Paint by Numbers" on YouTube

"Paint by Numbers" (Note: Stylized as "Paint by #'s" in early DreamWorks' promo CD's sent to the press.) is a song by the American pop rock band Self, released on July 21, 1998, as the lead single of Breakfast with Girls (1999). Distributed through DreamWorks Records and Spongebath Records, it first appeared in the soundtrack for the MTV film Dead Man on Campus (1998). The track was later nominated for Song of the Year by the Nashville Music Association Awards.

== Background ==
"Paint by Numbers" was written by Matt Mahaffey as commentary against bands who simplify songwriting and chase trends after becoming a one-hit wonder, particularly inspired by Smash Mouth's career after their debut single "Walkin' on the Sun". The song's bassline was composed on a synthesizer by Matt before being performed on a sampled upright bass by his brother Mike Mahaffey. It was included on the soundtrack of the film Dead Man on Campus (1998), which released through MTV and DreamWorks Records on July 21, 1998. Director Alan Cohn picked "Paint by Numbers" as a theme for the main character, Josh Miller (Tom Everett Scott). It was later included as the sixth track of the band's third studio album, Breakfast with Girls (1999), released through DreamWorks and Spongebath Records. The song follows the power pop style of its origin album, additionally incorporating surf rock instrumentation.

== Reception ==
Ben Wener of The Orange County Register praised the styling of "Paint by Numbers", observing a resemblance to instrumentation prominent in Latin music. Jeremy Fleishman of The Daily Texan declared the song "destined for radio play", lauding its diverse influence and the track's inclusion of other techniques used on Breakfast with Girls. Robert Wilonsky of Dallas Observer noted that the song's commercial success was hindered by Weezer and Beck's recent success within rock music, but stated that it deserved a much larger audience. Gerald Dih of AudioPhix listed the track as one of the best surf rock songs of the 1990s, commending its succinct approach to "great guitar interplay and punchy drums". Rivers Cuomo discovered "Paint by Numbers" on Napster due to the service's prevalence of mislabeled files, with the song being listed under his band Weezer with the title "Ex-Girlfriend".

== Accolades ==
At the 1999 Nashville Music Association Awards, Self received a nomination in the Song of the Year category for "Paint by Numbers", ultimately losing to Faith Hill's "This Kiss".

Nominations for "Paint by Numbers"
Year	Organization	Award	Result
1999	Nashville Music Association Awards	Song of the Year	Nominated

== Personnel ==
Credits adapted from the album's liner notes.

Self

- Matt Mahaffey – lead vocals, instruments
- Mike Mahaffey – electric guitar, acoustic guitar, bass
- Mac Burrus – bass
- Chris James – piano, B-3, vox
- Jason Rawlings – percussion

Technical

- Matt Mahaffey – production, engineer
- Hugh Padgham – mixing engineer
- Bob Ludwig – mastering engineer
- Richard Williams – executive producer
- Richard Dodd – engineer
- Bobby Dufresne Jr. – engineer
- Jeff Balding – engineer
- Ken Andrews – engineer
- Shawn McLean – engineer
- Joe Baldridge – engineer
- Chris James – engineer
- Glenn Spinner – assistant engineer
- Aaron Swihart – assistant engineer
- Joe Costa – assistant engineer
- Brian Garten – assistant engineer
- John Saylor – assistant engineer
