= Cannon (song) =

1995 single by Self

Single by Self

from the album Subliminal Plastic Motives
- B-side: "Sophomore Jinx"
- Released: October 24, 1995
- Recorded: 1994–May 1995
- Genre: Power pop; alternative rock
- Length: 4:01
- Label: Zoo; Spongebath
- Songwriter: Matt Mahaffey
- Producer: Matt Mahaffey

Self singles chronology
"Cannon" (1995)	"So Low" (1996)

Music video
- "Cannon" on YouTube

"Cannon" is a song by the American pop rock band Self, released on October 24, 1995. It was the band's debut single, distributed simultaneously with their debut studio album Subliminal Plastic Motives by Zoo Entertainment and Spongebath Records. It became an alternative rock radio hit, boosted by its Jesse Peretz-directed music video airing on MTV.

== Background and release ==
Matt Mahaffey wrote the song "Cannon" in tribute to Richard Williams, founder of Spongebath Records and manager of his band Self. It lyrically incorporates the advice Williams received from others, switching between embracing support and spiting opposition. "Cannon" begins with a white noise sample, leading into soft verses. This builds until it rockets into a heavy chorus, using a sporadic guitar sequence and bassline alternating with intense vocals. It instrumentally aligns with a power pop and alternative rock style. The song was released alongside the album as the lead single of Subliminal Plastic Motives on October 24, 1995.

A music video for "Cannon" was released in 1995, directed by Jesse Peretz. The video opens with the band eating together, performing primarily in a kitchen with additional shots in various indoor and outdoor locations. Later, they assemble the band's name with marquee lettering outside a Thrifty Inn. The music video ends with the band eating, framed like the opening scene. It aired several times on MTV, commercially boosting the song. It additionally received radio play on alternative rock stations, including KROQ-FM.

== Reception ==
Larry Flick of Billboard commended the single, calling it a "dead-center hit". In the context of Subliminal Plastic Motives, the song was positively reviewed by Ryan Schreiber of Pitchfork. Chuck Campbell of Knoxville News Sentinel lauded "Cannon" as a "modern-rock hit", likening its lyricism to the Breeders' song "Cannonball". Laurent of Indiepoprock additionally praised the song, describing it as the best representation of energetic power pop. Contrarily, Eric Brace of the Washington Post labeled "Cannon" as uninventive for rock music, comparing it to the works of Better Than Ezra and the Dambuilders.

== Personnel ==
Credits adapted from the album's liner notes.

Self

- Matt Mahaffey – lead vocals, instruments, sampler
- Mike Mahaffey – instruments

Technical

- Matt Mahaffey – production, mixing engineer
- Bob Ludwig – mastering engineer
- Jim Faraci – mixing engineer, engineer
- Sean McLean – assistant engineer
- Pete Martinez – assistant engineer
- Brian Bottcher – art direction
