= The Katies =

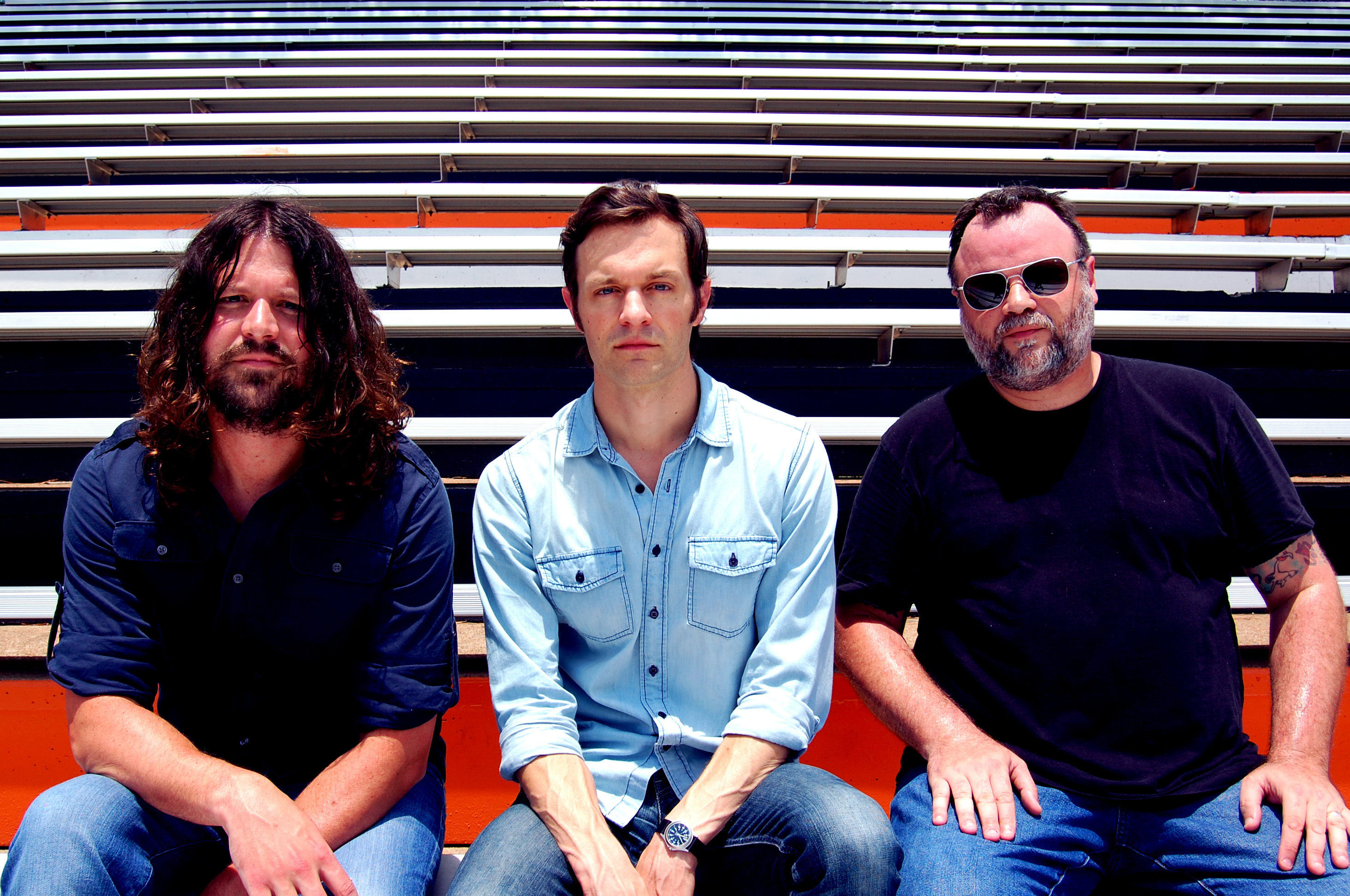

Background information
- Origin: Murfreesboro, Tennessee
- Genres: Power pop, classic rock, modern rock, hard rock
- Years active: 1996–2006 / 2017-current (approximately)
- Labels: Elektra Records, Spongebath Records
- Spinoff of: The Plain
- Past members: Jason Moore (guitar, vocals), Gary Welch (bass, vocals), Josh Moore (drums), Mac Burrus (guitar, keys), Joey Campbell (guitar)
- Website: www.thekaties.com

The Katies are a three-piece power rock band originating in Murfreesboro, Tennessee, and currently residing in Nashville, Tennessee

== History ==
Jason Moore (guitar, vocals) and Gary Welch (bass, vocals) had previously been in a Murfreesboro band called A Million Worlds. Once A Million Worlds dissolved, Jason and Gary began a new band—the Katies—named after Jason's sister in-law.

The duo recruited friends from local band Fluid Ounces for their rhythm section and began playing gigs around town, but didn't achieve a permanent lineup until Moore's younger brother Josh was recruited as their drummer. The first lineup of the band featured Fluid Ounces members Seth Timbs (piano) and Sam Baker (drums), and Mac Burrus (guitar.) Jason and Mac had previously been in Murfreesboro rock band The Plain. The band played with this lineup for a few shows around Murfreesboro.

Eventually, Seth Timbs and Sam Baker bowed out to concentrate on Fluid Ounces, so the band continued with Jason Moore, Gary Welch, and Mac Burrus. After an accident which resulted in Mac breaking his neck, the band was put on hold. Around this time, Jason convinced his younger brother, Josh, to leave their hometown of Clinton, Tennessee and move to Murfreesboro to play drums for the Katies as soon as he graduated high-school.

While waiting for Josh to graduate, the band continued to play sporadic dates around Murfreesboro and Nashville, with Mac Burrus now playing a Fender Rhodes. Mac eventually left the band, accepting an offer to play bass for Matt Mahaffey's band, Self.

With Josh now living in Murfreesboro, the band's sound grew—and changed—as a power trio. The band began writing their own brand of radio-friendly, melodic power pop. The band’s music was influenced by classic rock bands like the Beatles, Led Zeppelin, and The Heartbreakers, as well as more contemporary bands like The Pixies and Supergrass. Jason’s lyrics centered personal themes like spirituality and the love for his wife.

The band began to make a name for themselves around town and started to draw a following, playing with local bands like Self, The Features, and Fluid Ounces. The Katies then cut a series of demos with local producer Brian Carter (now referred to as The Carter Sessions). These demos caught the ear of Rick Williams, who had just launched local indie label Spongebath Records, along with Matt Mahaffey and Seth Timbs.

Williams eventually signed the band to Spongebath. The band then recorded another batch of demos with Carter (The Carter Sessions Volume 2). These demos, along with the band's ear-splitting and energetic live show, resulted in major label interest. The band ultimately inked a deal that would give both Elektra Records and Spongebath a co-label release for the Katies' major label debut.

The band recorded their debut album, The Katies, in 1998 with Nashville producer Joe Baldridge at the helm. Their first single was "Noggin' Poundin'," a crowd-favorite album track with a radio friendly chorus. The album was released on July 13, 1999, the same day as labelmates Self-released Breakfast with Girls. To celebrate the co-releases, the band played a sold-out, widely bootlegged show with Self at Nashville club The Exit/In.

Although reviews for The Katies (and the "Noggin' Poundin'" single itself) were universally positive, neither Spongebath nor Elektra marketed or promoted the album effectively, and sales were lackluster. However, the band continued to tour around the Southeast, promoting the album and continuing to write and record. They had a minor radio hit with their single "Noggin' Poundin." During this time, the Katies opened for bands like The Verve Pipe and Lynyrd Skynyrd.

In the aftermath of the album release, Elektra dropped the band, and the Katies ultimately left Spongebath Records. The band continued to gig and recorded more promising demos with Brent Rawlings, whose brother, Jason, was the drummer for Self.

In 2001, the band recorded a new EP with Matt Mahaffey at his studio in Los Angeles (which was released as the EP "Blue" in April 2020. Encouraged by Matt and the positive response to their EP, the band relocated to Los Angeles permanently. After a year of playing shows in the L.A. area, Gary Welch, missing his family and son, decided to move back to Tennessee. Jason and Josh, however, decided to stay in L.A and formed a band called WhenBreathingStops with Shawn Brock and Shawn Turner. The Katies, essentially, had ended.

By 2005, both Jason and Josh had moved back to the Nashville area as well. In August, the band officially reunited (with auxiliary guitarist Joey Campbell) at a memorial tribute for their friend, Self guitarist Mike Mahaffey. The experience was so memorable that the band reunited and continued to gig around Nashville and Murfreesboro as a quartet.

After a brief return to the Nashville rock scene, the band had dissolved again by 2006, with Welch fronting new band SJ & The Props, and the Moore brothers continuing to play together in various projects.

The Katies reformed in 2017 and began releasing singles while working on a future album.

== Critical acclaim ==
Tom Demalon from Allmusic praised their debut, saying

The Murfreesboro, TN trio the Katies -- consisting of brothers Jason and Joshua Moore on vocals/guitar and drums, and Gary Welch on bass -- takes the best elements of melodic hard rock and alternative pop to create an arresting debut. Melding the sonic punch of bands like Stone Temple Pilots and the pop sense of the Beatles, their first release, produced by Joe Baldridge, is an infectious brew. Lead singer Jason Moore possesses the same pop-perfect vocals of Robin Zander and the music manages to sound both raw and polished at the same time. "Powerkiss," the leadoff track, is the first of many memorable cuts with its "do I, do I, do I...do I need you" hook. The single "Noggin' Poundin' (Tongue-Tied & Underspoken)" is a sheer sonic delight with its chugging riffs and buzz-saw guitars. The less frenetic numbers are also a flat-out success. "Shisiedo" features a dreamy, lovelorn lyric delivered by Moore with urgency, and "Jesus Pick" combines the moody, spacey feel with wry lyrics advising Jesus against returning to create a tour-de-force. An inspired and significant release made more impressive by the fact that it's the Katies' first album.
