= The Half-Baked Serenade =

Studio album by Self
- Released: April 24, 1997
- Studios: Mahaffey's home, Murfreesboro
- Genres: Electropop; punk rock; hip hop; jazz
- Length: 33:43
- Label: Spongebath
- Producer: Matt Mahaffey

Self chronology
Subliminal Plastic Motives (1995)	The Half-Baked Serenade (1997)	Feels Like Breakin' Shit (1998)

Singles from The Half-Baked Serenade
- 1. "KiDdies" Released: December 11, 1999

The Half-Baked Serenade is the second studio album by the American pop rock band Self, released through Spongebath Records on April 24, 1997. Following the success of Subliminal Plastic Motives (1995), frontman Matt Mahaffey distanced himself from rock music stereotypes, focusing instead on electropop instrumentation for the project. Upon release, the album received favorable reviews for its bold experimentation and ornate compositions. It peaked at number 48 on CMJ's Alternative Radio Airplay chart and number 70 on the CMJ Top 200. The single "KiDdies" received national radio play and topped some local charts.

== Background ==
Following the success of Self's debut album Subliminal Plastic Motives (1995), frontman Matt Mahaffey and his brother Mike recruited keyboardist Chris James, drummer Jason Rawlings, and bassist Tim Nobles to sustain touring as a band. They later found difficulty working with Nobles, leading to his removal from the group and lack of appearance on any album. During the same period, Mahaffey frequently received invitations to strip clubs from radio personalities and other music industry colleagues for his association with Subliminal Plastic Motives. Mahaffey's strong disinterest in this lifestyle led him to drop his guitar usage, citing the stereotypes around rock bands like Eve 6 and Green Day as the reason.

== Development and release ==
Self's logo as seen on the front cover art.

After touring with rock band Cracker for two months, Mahaffey returned home and found a message from a crazed fan in his answering machine. She had developed a parasocial relationship with him, believing his music to be about her and sharing personal information, including an interest in dressing like Marilyn Manson. After removing his name from the city's phone book, Mahaffey incorporated the message into the songs "KiDdies" and "Cinderblocks for Shoes", directly sampling it in the latter. Another song, "Joy, the Mechanical Boy", was stated to be about ecstasy use. The track "Song for Nelson" is an instrumental spy theme inspired by Mahaffey's colleague Nelson, who would gift bags of CDs to him that were discarded by MCA Records.

Using a Discman, Self recorded the album solely in Mahaffey's living room. Following completion, The Half-Baked Serenade was released without any promotion in contrast to the high-budget marketing campaign by Zoo Entertainment for their previous album. The album was sold on CD for $7 USD ($14.04 in 2025), available exclusively through mail order from Spongebath Records. Its limited publicity led the band's shift in style not to reach many fans, believing Self to still focus on alternative rock. "KiDdies" was later marketed as the album's sole single, receiving radio play nationwide and ranking number one on some stations. Since Spongebath's dissolution, Mahaffey has maintained independent rights to the album. In 2014, "Microchip Girl" appeared as part of a live acoustic set by Self.

== Reception ==
Professional ratings
Review scores
Source	Rating
Pitchfork	7.5/10
Spin	7/10

The Half-Baked Serenade received favorable reviews upon release. Shan Fowler of Pitchfork gave the album a rating of 7.5/10, highlighting its wit and comparing the electronic instrumentation and lyrical subjects to OK Computer (1997). Chuck Eddy of Spin gave it a rating of 7/10, complimenting Mahaffey's versatility between songs and intricate compositions. Laurent of Indiepoprock praised extensive sample usage of The Half-Baked Serenade, only finding vexation with its brevity. Gabe Besecker of Woof Magazine lauded the album's experimental qualities in contrast to the previous hard rock style of Self.

== Accolades ==
At the 1998 Nashville Music Awards, Self received a nomination for the Rock Album of the Year category for The Half-Baked Serenade.

Nominations for The Half-Baked Serenade
Year	Organization	Award	Result
1998	Nashville Music Awards	Rock Album of the Year	Nominated

== Track listing ==
All tracks are written by Matt Mahaffey.

The Half-Baked Serenade track listing
No.	Title	Length
1.	"Joy, the Mechanical Boy"	4:11
2.	"Dielya Downtown"	2:16
3.	"Crimes on Paper"	2:57
4.	"KiDdies"	2:33
5.	"Cinderblocks for Shoes"	2:56
6.	"Song for Nelson"	1:57
7.	"Preschool Days"	3:02
8.	"Cater to Your Ego"	1:58
9.	"Microchip Girl"	3:39
10.	"Sassy Britches"	5:04
11.	"When You're Alone" (Hidden track)	3:07
Total length:		33:43

== Personnel ==
Credits adapted from the album's liner notes.

- Matt Mahaffey – lead vocals, instruments, production, mixing, arrangement
- Tommy Dorsey – mastering engineer
- Chris James – mixing
- Jason Rawlings – mixing (all tracks), drums (2)
- Brian Rogers – guitar (4)
- Mike Mahaffey – guitar (9)
- Brian Bottcher – album design, artwork direction

== Charts ==
Weekly chart performance for The Half-Baked Serenade
Chart (1997–1998)	Peak position
Alternative Radio Airplay (CMJ)	48
CMJ Top 200	70
