= Feels Like Breakin' Shit =

- Cover art made by Mahaffey, 1999

Compilation album by Self
- Released: October 1998
- Recorded: 1994–1998
- Genres: Alternative rock; punk rock
- Length: 49:53 (Spongebath); 49:19 (DreamWorks)
- Labels: Spongebath; DreamWorks
- Producers: Matt Mahaffey; Todd Kinnon

Self chronology
The Half-Baked Serenade (1997)	Feels Like Breakin' Shit (1998)	Breakfast with Girls (1999)

Feels Like Breakin' Shit (sometimes stylized as ...Feels Like Breakin' Shit) is the first compilation album by the American pop rock band Self, released for free via Spongebath Records and DreamWorks Records as an internet download in October 1998. It consists of songs scrapped from the band's first two albums along with other demos, covers, and parodies.

== Background ==
After the completion of Self's Subliminal Plastic Motives (1995) and The Half-Baked Serenade (1997), frontman Matt Mahaffey had a collection of songs scrapped from both albums. Concerned that his DATs would corrupt, he compiled the songs onto a single CD-R as a backup. He made several copies, entitled Feels Like Breakin' Shit, and gave the first one to his manager at Spongebath Records, Rick Williams. It spread throughout the label and leaked online with positive feedback from fans, leading multiple colleagues to encourage Mahaffey to put out the compilation. It was then officially released as a free Internet download through Spongebath and DreamWorks Records. Fans were encouraged to make their own artwork for the album, as none was included with the digital files. Mahaffey made his own cover for it in 1999. The album was later removed and replaced with Self Goes Shopping (2000), the band's second EP.

== Content and reception ==
Self's logo on Mahaffey's cover art.

Feels Like Breakin' Shit widely varies in style through its tracklist, such as techno instrumentation on the opening song "Having Dinner With the Funk", though it primarily follows an alternative punk rock style. Laurent of Indiepoprock praised this alongside the compilation's quality, suggesting that the songs "Pumpkinhead" and "Dog You Are" would've fit on Subliminal Plastic Motives. Bryan Tilford of Ink 19 complimented "Wide Awake at 7" and "Hey, Deceiver", finding them the most resemblant of "that classic sound-of-Self". The track "Dog You Are" was played during live shows beginning in 1996, stated by Mahaffey to be about a critic from Utah who negatively reviewed Subliminal Plastic Motives. Another song on the album, "Breakdancers Reunion", was written about a friend named James who would breakdance on command, with Mahaffey having numerous recordings of him on Bourbon Street. The ending composition of it came from a desire to say "motherfucker" through a vocoder.

Four cover songs appear on Feels Like Breakin' Shit, such as a frenetic cover of Prince's "Let's Pretend We're Married". Another cover is of "Hey, Lou", written by Sam Baker of Speake. Self's version contains a light chord progression, intended to contrast the darker instrumentation used by other bands who cover the song. The album additionally includes covers of Suzanne Vega's "Fat Man and Dancing Girl" and Tommy Roe's "Dizzy". Two parodies are also featured: The first is of Alanis Morissette's "Ironic" as "Moronic", with vulgar and comedic lyrics replacing the original, having been performed as early as June 1996. This precedes the song "Titanic", inspired by Mahaffey singing the Pixies' "Gigantic" before watching the film Titanic (1997). Following the experience, he spent 30 minutes writing a parody of the song around the film plot and included Weezer's "The World Has Turned and Left Me Here" after realizing the two songs shared a melody.

== Track listing ==
All tracks are written by Matt Mahaffey, except where noted.

Feels Like Breakin' Shit tracklist
No.	Title	Length
1.	"Having Dinner With the Funk"	1:13
2.	"Wide Awake at 7"	4:08
3.	"Let's Pretend We're Married" (Prince cover)	3:36
4.	"Breakdancers Reunion"	3:20
5.	"Pumpkinhead"	1:59
6.	"Glued to the Girl"	3:41
7.	"Kodak Moment"	2:19
8.	"Hey, Deceiver"	3:09
9.	"Moronic" (Parody of Alanis Morissette's "Ironic")	2:49
10.	"Titanic" (Parody of Pixies' "Gigantic" with interpolation of Weezer's "The World Has Turned and Left Me Here")	3:04
11.	"Binocular"	2:00
12.	"Fat Man and Dancing Girl" (Suzanne Vega cover)	2:15
13.	"Dog You Are"	2:57
14.	"Love Interest"	2:09
15.	"Hey, Lou" (Speake cover)	4:17
16.	"Dizzy" (Tommy Roe cover)	3:38
17.	"Life Could Be Swell"	3:19
Total length:		49:53

Alternate DreamWorks tracklist
No.	Title	Length
9.	"Overpopulation"	2:15
Total length:		49:19
