= Self (band) =

American pop rock band

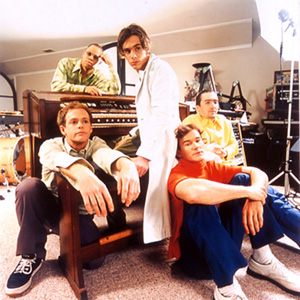
- Self inside Mahaffey's home studio, 1999

Background information
- Origin: Murfreesboro, Tennessee, U.S.
- Genres: Power pop; art rock; alternative rock; new wave; internet music
- Works: Self discography
- Years active: 1993–present (hiatus: 2006–2012; 2018–2022)
- Labels: Spongebath; Zoo; DreamWorks; Fat Possum; El Camino
- Spinoffs: Wired All Wrong
- Spinoff of: Ella Minopy
- Members: Matt Mahaffey; Chris James; Mac Burrus; Jason Rawlings
- Past members: Mike Mahaffey; Tim Nobles
- Website: self.is
- Logo

Self (often stylized as sElf) is an American pop rock band formed in 1993 in Murfreesboro, Tennessee. The band is led by vocalist and multi-instrumentalist Matt Mahaffey, additionally consisting of keyboardist Chris James, bassist Mac Burrus, and drummer Jason Rawlings. Former members include guitarist Mike Mahaffey and touring bassist Tim Nobles. The group began as a duo on Spongebath Records with the Mahaffey brothers, immediately picked up by Zoo Entertainment to release their debut album, Subliminal Plastic Motives (1995). It sold over 40,000 copies in its first two years with support from the singles "Cannon" and "So Low". After expanding the lineup for live performances, the band embraced an experimental approach with The Half-Baked Serenade (1997), followed by a compilation of demos, Feels Like Breakin' Shit (1998).

The band signed with DreamWorks Records for their third album, releasing Breakfast with Girls (1999), which included lead single "Paint by Numbers". Originally receiving mixed reviews, it has retrospectively achieved critical acclaim despite its numerous production challenges and delays. Their fourth album, Gizmodgery (2000), was created entirely with toy instruments. It featured the single "Trunk Fulla Amps", as well as the sleeper hit "Dead Man". Self also contributed songs to film soundtracks, including "Stay Home" for Shrek (2001), and "Out with a Bang" for Evolution (2001). The band's fifth album, Ornament & Crime (2017), was planned for release in 2003 but was delayed until 2004 and eventually shelved due to DreamWorks' dissolution.

Following the death of Mike Mahaffey in 2005, the band went on hiatus. Matt Mahaffey pursued solo projects, including Wired All Wrong, and continued producing music for and touring with other artists such as Beck and Hellogoodbye. While James worked with Prince, Rawlings played drums in Suburban Tragedy, and Burrus joined the Jimmy Kimmel Live! crew. Self reunited for the EP Super Fake Nice (2014), highlighted by the single "Runaway", and celebrated the twentieth anniversary of Subliminal Plastic Motives with a vinyl reissue and live performances. The EP was distributed by El Camino Media, whom in 2017 gave Ornament & Crime an official release. After years of stagnation, the band returned in 2024 with the single "Love You Less" and the holiday track "Merry Christmas, Santa".

== History ==
=== 1993–1996: Formation and Subliminal Plastic Motives ===
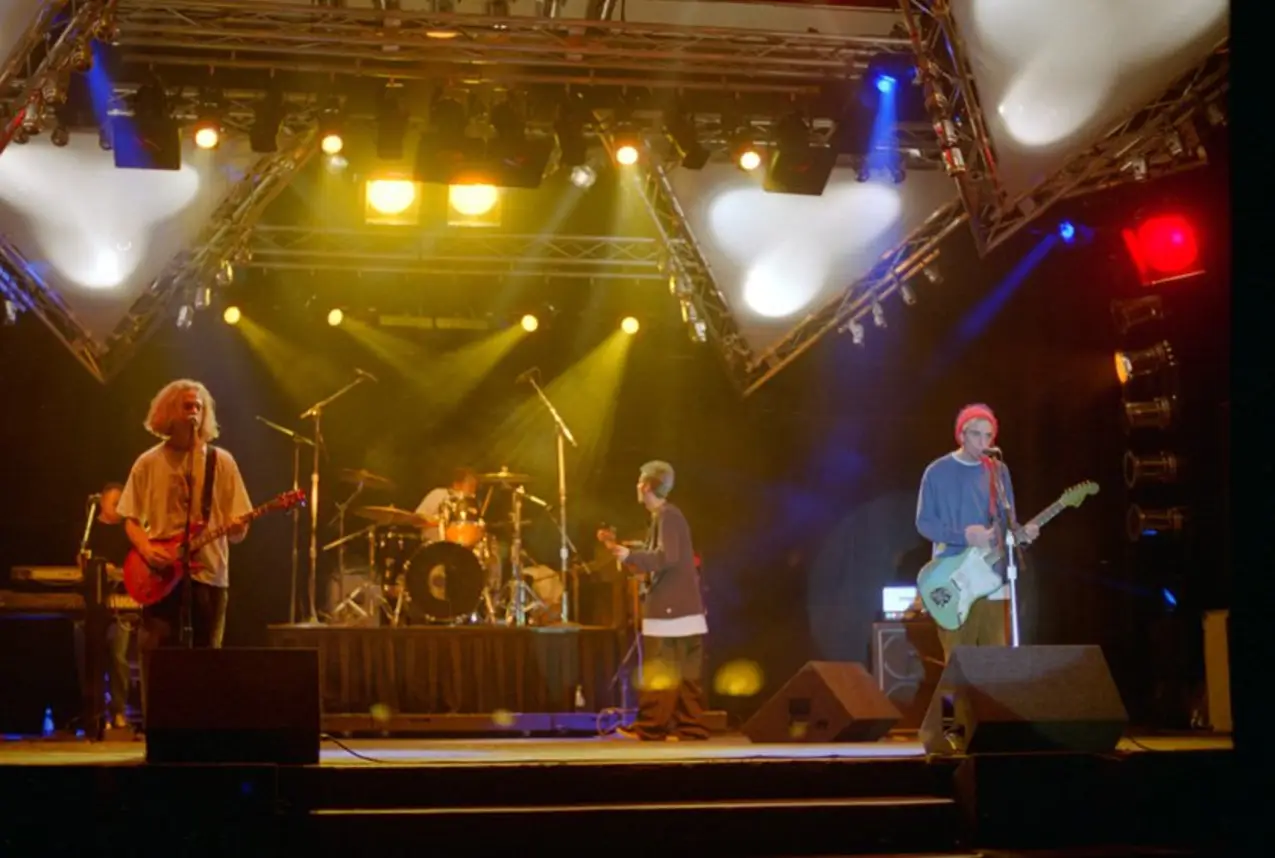
Self performing live in 1996

Self was formed in 1993 in Murfreesboro, Tennessee by Matt Mahaffey. Simultaneously, his band Ella Minopy with Seth Timbs disbanded, and Spongebath Records was founded by the two and talent manager Richard Williams. Mahaffey began writing his debut album after encouragement from Williams, recruiting his brother Mike Mahaffey as a guitarist into Self for recording assistance. After a public performance in Nashville, Tennessee, he received and accepted a recording contract from Zoo Entertainment in March 1995. The label partnered with Spongebath to co-release albums for a year, distributing them through BMG.

Mahaffey finished the project in May 1995, releasing Subliminal Plastic Motives on October 24. The band's debut single "Cannon" supported it, followed by "So Low" in 1996. Jesse Peretz directed music videos for both songs, airing them on MTV. The album was commercially successful, with sales exceeding 40,000 units by 1997, and its singles receiving radio play. After release, Self recruited three more members for live performances: keyboardist Chris James, a college friend of Mahaffey; drummer Jason Rawlings, from the local band Brian Cuzies; and bassist Tim Nobles.

=== 1997–1998: The Half-Baked Serenade and Feels Like Breakin' Shit ===
After touring, Tim Nobles was removed from the band. In an interview with Silent Uproar, Mahaffey stated that "it just wasn't working out". He additionally felt that his first album gave the band an inaccurate public image, reinforced by Mahaffey's discomfort with his extravagant new lifestyle. He declared Self to be "anti-rock", significantly reducing guitar usage and leaning into electropop instrumentation. He then began writing and recording a new album in his living room, releasing it as The Half-Baked Serenade on April 24, 1997. To further repel fame, it was distributed without any promotion, and sold exclusively through mail order via Spongebath.

Various scrapped songs and demos of Subliminal Plastic Motives and The Half-Baked Serenade were saved by Mahaffey, later compiled into a disc titled Feels Like Breakin' Shit. After sharing multiple copies with Spongebath personnel, it leaked online and became popular among fans. Self officially released it as a compilation album in 1998. During this time, the band was auditioning in search of a horn section and new bassist for concerts. They settled on Mac Burrus for the role, who visited Mahaffey's home after Self's second album was released.

=== 1998–1999: Breakfast with Girls ===
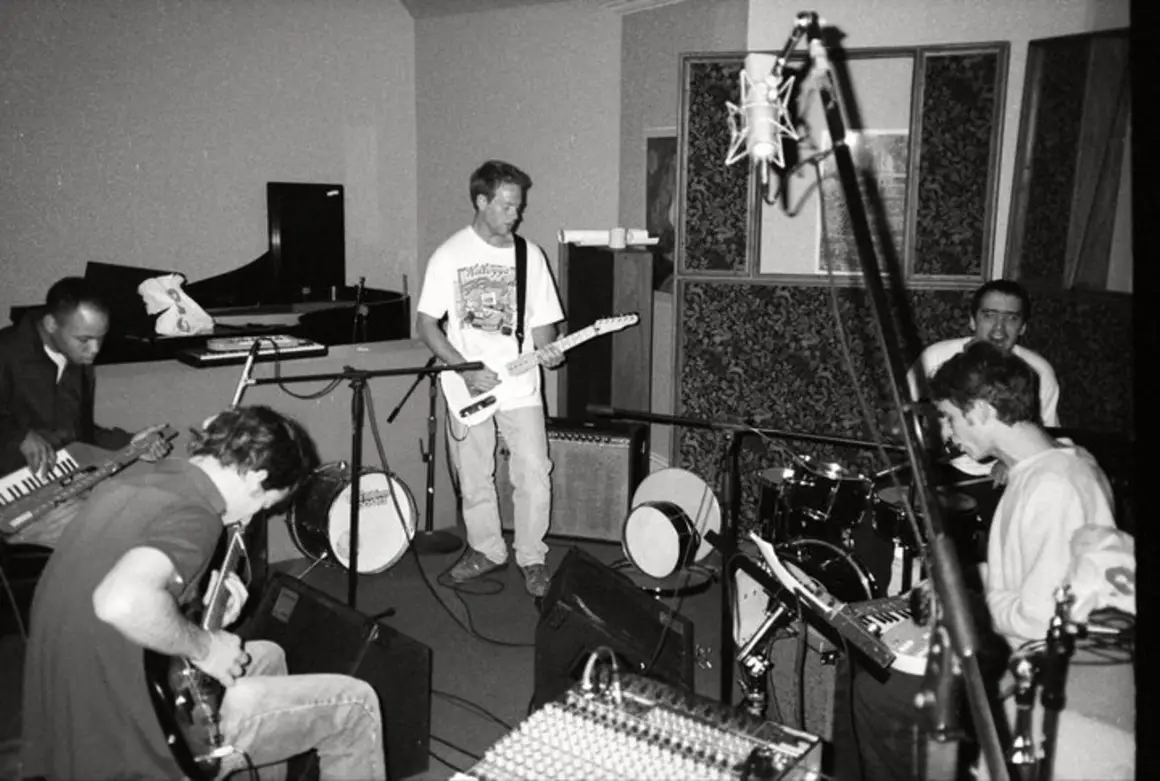
Self recording together in 1998

After their second album, Self received an offer for and accepted a recording contract from DreamWorks Records. Their significantly higher budget led the band to collaborate with acclaimed musicians, including Ken Andrews of Failure, Richard Dodd, and Hugh Padgham. Recording occurred in multiple professional studios, and Mahaffey experimented more with production. Multiple issues occurred during this process, such as file corruption, disagreements over singles for the album, and numerous delays in the release date. First announced to release on August 25, 1998, Breakfast with Girls was finally released via DreamWorks and Spongebath on July 13, 1999.

As consolation for the delays, the EP Brunch was given to customers who pre-ordered the album, featuring scrapped songs. "Paint by Numbers" was released as the first single of Breakfast with Girls on July 21, 1998, as part of the soundtrack for the 1998 film Dead Man on Campus. It was nominated for Song of the Year at the 1999 Nashville Music Association Awards. Another single for the album, "Meg Ryan", received airplay as the album's radio single. On August 4, 1998, the band released a cover version of Depeche Mode's "Shame" as part of the tribute album For the Masses.

=== 1999–2001: Gizmodgery and B-side releases ===
While spending weekdays working on Breakfast with Girls, Mahaffey began producing a fourth studio album on his weekends. Originally conceived as an idea in 1995, he was inspired by the Pianosaurus album Groovy Neighborhood (1987) to create an album entirely with toy instruments. To achieve the desired sound, Mahaffey extensively used Pro Tools to equalize and fix the audio's abundant mid-range frequencies. Gizmodgery released through Spongebath on September 5, 2000, as an HDCD. The album's sole single, "Trunk Fulla Amps", has been commonly cited as a fan favorite. A music video for it was published in February 2001 as part of MTV's "Indie Day", but wasn't aired due to Self's DreamWorks connection.

Gizmodgery sold 10,000 units in its first week, garnering praise for its unique production and playful energy. Retrospectively, Todd Olmstead of Vice described the album as Self's best-known. Its songs "Dead Man" and "What a Fool Believes" have since resurged in popularity on Spotify as Self's most popular songs. The band's second EP, Self Goes Shopping, consists of instrumental remixes of six Self songs. It was planned for DreamWorks distribution, but released through Spongebath on December 16, 2000. The EP was followed by Self's second compilation album, Selfafornia. Spongebath intermittently released it through mid-2001, with its final set of songs released on July 27, 2001. The compilation features scrapped songs and demos from the writing sessions of Gizmodgery.

=== 2001–2005: Film songs and Ornament & Crime ===
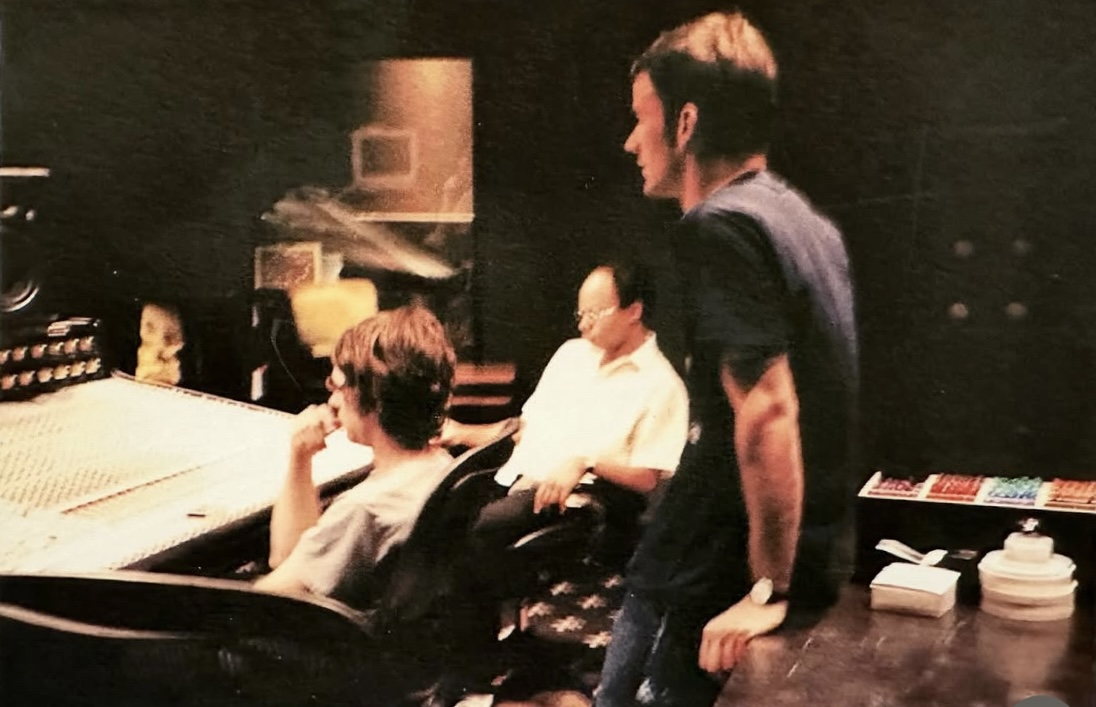
Self during the recording of Ornament & Crime in 2002.

The band contributed the song "Stay Home" to the 2001 animated fantasy comedy film Shrek. Originally composed for its opening sequence, it was moved to the end credits in favor of Smash Mouth's "All Star", but still opens the soundtrack album. This was followed by the song "Out with a Bang" appearing in the 2001 sci-fi comedy film Evolution, a track that would later appear on Self's fifth studio album. They began recording it in 2002, planning to return to the rock styling of the band's debut. Self released the single "Grow Up" in June 2003, which would end up being the albums sole single. On January 8, 2004, Ornament & Crime was completed. Before the album could be released, DreamWorks Records was bought and dissolved by Universal Music Group, who left the album indefinitely unreleased.

Whilst working on Ornament & Crime, Self was asked to create the song "Scotty Doesn't Know" for the 2004 teen sex comedy film EuroTrip. After being presented with its subject and characters, Mahaffey quickly wrote it and sent it to the film's producers, who generally enjoyed it. However, when they tasked the band Lustra with the same style of song, their result was favored. Additionally, when Mahaffey was offered work for the 2004 film Shrek 2, they wrote "This is Love" and covered the Archies' song "Sugar, Sugar", but were not featured. In 2005, Self released their third compilation album, Porno, Mint & Grime. It consists primarily of scrapped songs and demos from Ornament & Crime, along with songs made for commercial work, including "This is Love".

=== 2005–2008: Unreleased DVD and Wired All Wrong ===
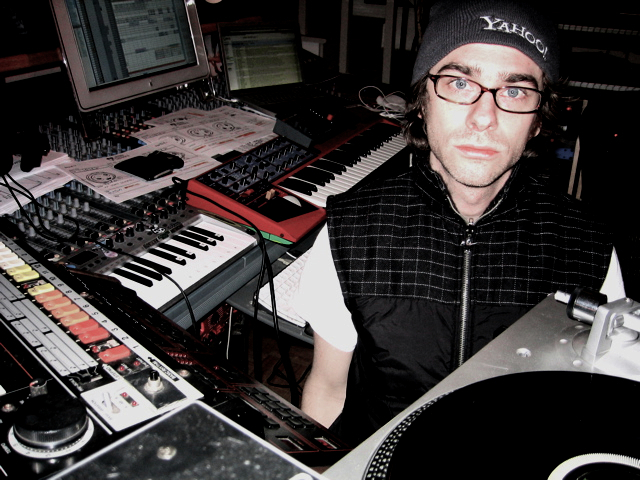
Mahaffey in 2007

On May 25, 2005, Mike Mahaffey died in his sleep, driving the band into a hiatus shortly after. They played a tribute show on September 10, which was posted as a bootleg recording on January 31, 2006. In 2005, a live video album was recorded at Spaceland. Its performance of "I Love to Love Your Love My Love" was posted to YouTube in mid-2006, with the DVD itself being stuck in development hell. In 2008, Mahaffey posted a cover of AC/DC's song "Back in Black" done solely on an omnichord and drums, also from the album. Self - Live at Spaceland Acoustic was made available for pre-order in April 2008, though it was never released due to copyright issues involving the cover.

In January 2005, Self was announced to be part of a They Might Be Giants tribute album, covering the song "Ana Ng". The song was previewed on MySpace in May, while Hello Radio: The Songs of They Might Be Giants was released on July 11, 2006. Self's cover was praised by Tim O'Neil of PopMatters for its power pop approach and interpolation of another They Might Be Giants song, "Thermostat". On March 21, 2006, Self released the song "Sucked out the Center" on MySpace. Multiple remixes of the song were made by fans, with eight being posted on the band's page through April. Matt Mahaffey continued performing as Self while on hiatus but without other band members, who began working on other projects. Rawlings played drums in a group called Suburban Tragedy, and Mahaffey also formed a new band, Wired All Wrong, with former God Lives Underwater member Jeff Turzo. Wired All Wrong released their first album, Break out the Battle Tapes on September 12, 2006.

=== 2007–2017: Super Fake Nice and re-issues ===
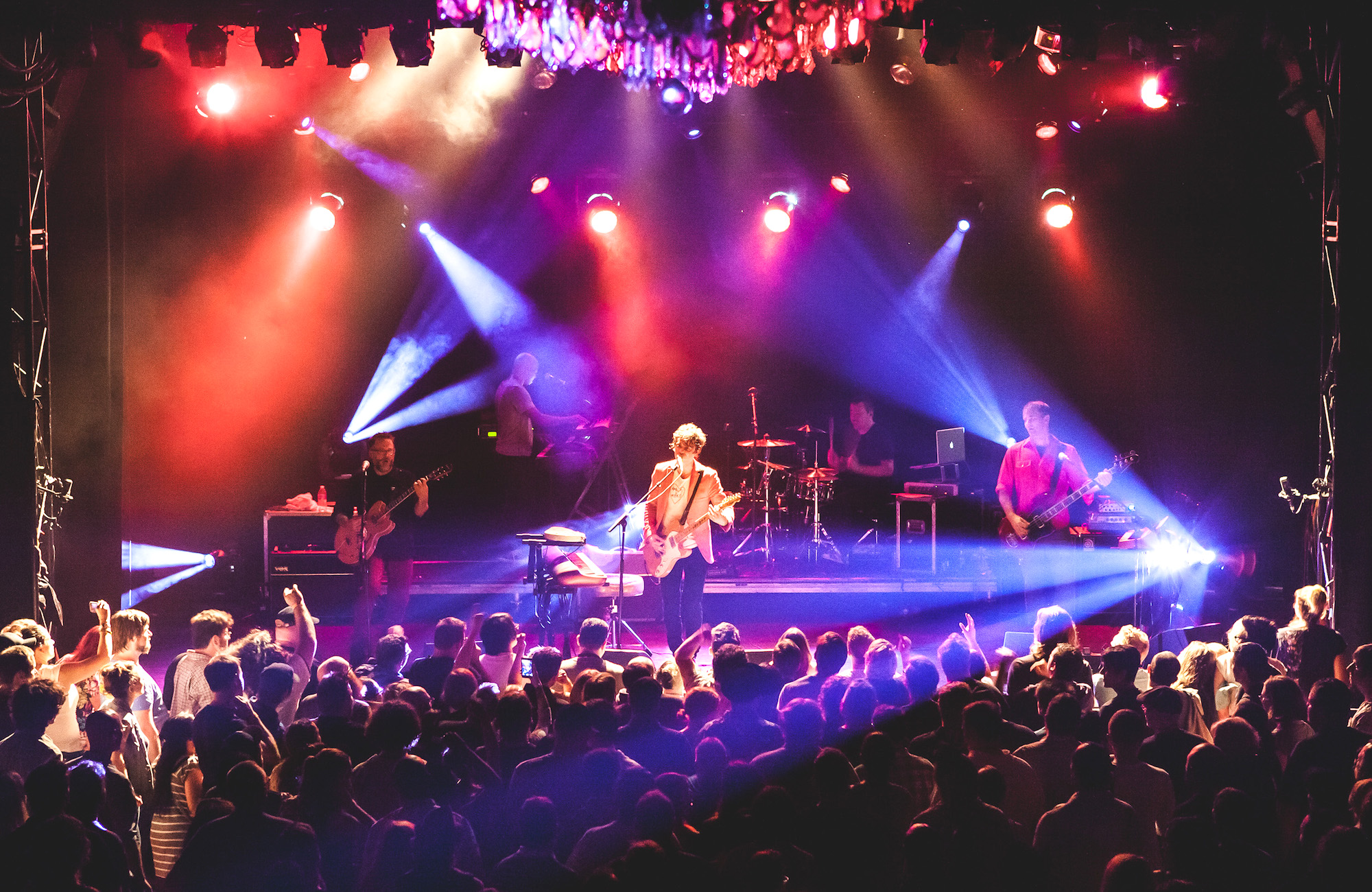
Self performing at the El Rey Theatre in Los Angeles, California in 2014

A project titled Super Fake Nice was announced in 2007, initially slated to be the band's sixth full-length studio album. Two songs from its recording sessions were published in 2009: "Orchid" and "Monogamy". For his album Lasers, Lupe Fiasco featured Self on the song "State Run Radio", releasing it on March 7, 2011. On May 10, 2010, Self released the single "Could You Love Me Now?" alongside a music video, followed by the track "Looks and Money" on November 28, 2011. In January 2012, Mahaffey finished building a home studio in Franklin, Tennessee, and began writing and recording more songs. Later in the year, Self began working with El Camino Media, an independent label they would later sign to for the project's distribution. A sold-out reunion show at Exit/In in Nashville was played on December 29, 2012, with Fluid Ounces guitarist Brian Rogers filling Mike Mahaffey's position.

In January 2014, Subliminal Plastic Motives was re-issued through Fat Possum Records, on vinyl for the first time. Celebrating its twentieth anniversary, the band performed the entire album at Gramercy Theater in New York City on January 10. Self contributed the song "Stranger than Strange" to the compilation Songs for Blake - Embracing Autism on May 13. On July 11, "Runaway" was released as a single for Super Fake Nice, now classed as the band's third EP. It additionally received a music video, which placed at number ten on Rolling Stone's top 20 music videos of 2014. The EP was released on July 29, followed by Self's TV debut on Jimmy Kimmel Live! the next day. For Record Store Day 2015, "Monogamy" and "Could You Love Me Now?" were bundled together and released as a 7-inch vinyl on April 18. Later in the year on September 11, El Camino Media re-issued Gizmodgery for its fifteenth anniversary, on vinyl for the first time. The label additionally released Ornament & Crime on August 25, 2017, being its first official issue after thirteen years since completion.

=== 2022–present: You've Been Tricked ===
On May 10, 2022, Mahaffey announced via his Instagram account that he was making new Self music for the first time in nearly 10 years. The band began teasing segments of artwork through October 2024, releasing the single "Love You Less" on November 6. Jamie Good of WRLT praised the track, comparing the updated instrumentation to the style of Matty Healy. On November 29, 2024, he contributed the song "Merry Christmas, Santa" under the pseudonym Elfs to the album Christmas in Space by Cake in Space, a composer collective by Mahaffey. Beginning in the 2020s, Self experienced a resurgence in popularity after their Spotify account was verified, and suggested amongst music by indie rock artists Tally Hall and Lemon Demon. By July 2025, the band had reached 40,000 listeners on Spotify. Less than six months later in January 2026, the band had reached over a million monthly listeners on the platform. On March 9, Mahaffey revealed the title of Self's sixth album to be You've Been Tricked, and requested Discord users to post their favorite songs by the band for idea interpretation.

== Discography ==
Studio albums

- Subliminal Plastic Motives (1995)
- The Half-Baked Serenade (1997)
- Breakfast with Girls (1999)
- Gizmodgery (2000)
- Ornament & Crime (2017)

== Filmography ==
- Live at Spaceland Acoustic (Unreleased)

== Band members ==
Current members

- Matt Mahaffey – lead vocals, lead guitar, bass guitar, keyboards, drums (1993–present)
- Chris James – keyboards, mixing (1995–2005, 2012–2017, 2022–present)
- Jason Rawlings – drums (1995–2005, 2012–2017, 2022–present)
- Mac Burrus – bass guitar (1998–2005, 2012–2017, 2022–present)

Former members

- Mike Mahaffey – backing vocals, lead guitar (1993–2005; his death)
- Tim Nobles – bass guitar (1995–1997)

Touring musicians

- Seth Timbs – bass, keyboards, backing vocals (1997, 2011–2013)
- Brian Rogers – guitar, backing vocals (1997, 2012–2017)
- Swan Burrus - backing vocals, percussion (2001, 2003)

Timeline
