= Stay Home =

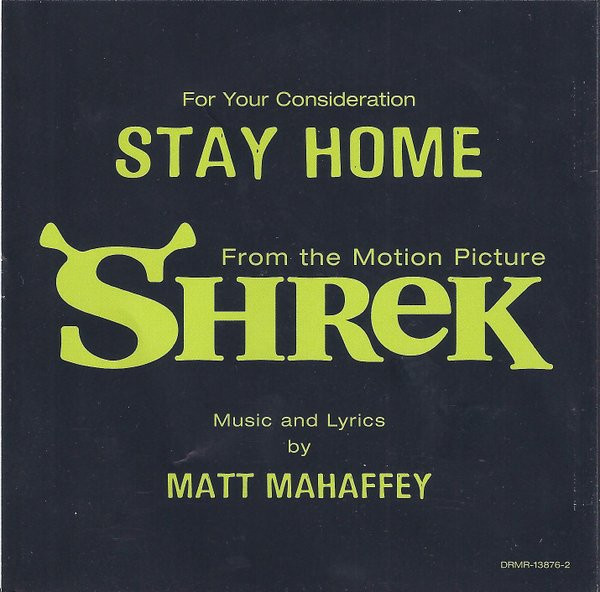
- CD single credited solely under Matt Mahaffey

Single by Self

from the album Shrek: Music from the Original Motion Picture
- Released: May 15, 2001
- Recorded: 2000–2001
- Studio: Matt's House (Murfreesboro)
- Genre: Alternative rock; power pop
- Length: 3:28 (soundtrack); 3:25 (single)
- Label: DreamWorks
- Songwriter: Matt Mahaffey (Note: Mac Burrus and Swan Burrus assisted in writing but are uncredited.)
- Producer: Eric Valentine (Note: Mahaffey produced the film's version and single version, and Valentine produced the soundtrack version.)

Self singles chronology
"Trunk Fulla Amps" (1999)	"Stay Home" (2001)	"Grow Up" (2003)

"Stay Home" is a song by the American pop rock band Self, released through DreamWorks Records on May 15, 2001. It was written and performed by the band's lead member, Matt Mahaffey, with mixing and production by Eric Valentine. The track was composed for the 2001 DreamWorks animated fairy tale comedy film Shrek, appearing in its end credits and on the film's accompanying soundtrack.

== Background ==
In 1999, pop rock band Self released the album Breakfast with Girls through DreamWorks Records as part of a recording contract. The band's lead member, Matt Mahaffey, continued to receive offers from the label following its release. The first of these was to write a song for the opening scene of the DreamWorks Animation film Shrek. Simultaneously, the studio was considering using Smash Mouth's "All Star" for the sequence, motivating Mahaffey to try topping it. He began writing and composing the song after watching a rough cut of the movie. He found Shrek to be a "curmudgeon" from it, attempting to encapsulate his vibe in the song's lyrics and finishing it a month later as "Stay Home".

Marylata Elton, the supervisor for Shrek's music, found the song to work perfectly. She tested the song in early movie screenings but discovered that audiences preferred "All Star" due to its pre-existing cultural impact. DreamWorks' founder Jeffrey Katzenberg opted to license the latter, moving Self's song to the film's credits. Though initially disappointed, Mahaffey retrospectively supported the decision, describing it as "sonically gorgeous" and stating that Smash Mouth deserved the success in a 2022 interview with Syfy.

== Release ==
"Stay Home" was released by Self on May 15, 2001, as the first song of the soundtrack album for the film, Shrek: Music from the Original Motion Picture. It was individually released as a "for your consideration" single solely under Mahaffey's name. He continued to compose music for the Shrek franchise following "Stay Home", including contributions to the Universal Studios Hollywood and Florida ride Shrek 4-D, Shrek in the Swamp Karaoke Dance Party (2001), Far Far Away Idol (2004), Shrek 2 (2004), and Shrek Forever After (2010).

== Track listing ==
CD single
No.	Title	Writer(s)	Length
1.	"Stay Home"	Matt Mahaffey	3:25

== Release history ==
Release dates and formats
Country	Date	Format(s)	Edition
United States	May 15, 2001	CD; LP; cassette; digital download	Soundtrack
United States	2001	CD	Single
