= Subliminal Plastic Motives =

Studio album by Self
- Released: October 24, 1995
- Recorded: 1994–May 1995
- Genres: Power pop; alternative rock; hip-hop; jazz
- Length: 42:38
- Labels: Zoo; Spongebath; Fat Possum
- Producer: Matt Mahaffey

Self chronology
Subliminal Plastic Motives (1995)	The Half-Baked Serenade (1997)

Alternate cover
- 2014 remade cover art

Singles from Subliminal Plastic Motives
- 1. "Cannon" Released: October 24, 1995; 2. "So Low" Released: 1996

Subliminal Plastic Motives is the debut studio album by the American pop rock band Self, released on October 24, 1995, through Zoo Entertainment and Spongebath Records. Its songs were written and recorded by brothers Mike and Matt Mahaffey, the band's sole members. The album was promoted through the singles "Cannon" and "So Low", each receiving airplay and accompanied by music videos that contributed to the album's success.

Critical reception was largely positive, with reviewers commending its eclectic production, sharp lyricism, and innovative approach to alternative rock, drawing comparisons to Beck, Matthew Sweet, and Ben Folds. Subliminal Plastic Motives debuted at number 64 on CMJ's Alternative Radio Airplay chart and had achieved sales exceeding 40,000 units by 1997. In 2014, Self issued the album's first vinyl release through Fat Possum Records.

== Background ==
Since age four, the American musician Matt Mahaffey has written and performed music, expressing interest in becoming a drummer. His parents gifted him a toy drum kit each year until he was nine, when he received a real drum kit and began performing with other kids. In 1991, Mahaffey moved to Murfreesboro, Tennessee to attend Middle Tennessee State University with a major in music. Enrolled in the Recording Industry Management program, he performed as a drummer with multiple local bands ranging between pop, R&B, rock, and punk. Mahaffey additionally produced music for various rappers, selling songs out of his dormitory room for $40 ($91.80 in 2025).

Discovering that he received more experience outside of class, he dropped out in his second year. Alongside the decision, the band Ella Minopy was formed, with Gary Miller and fellow dropout and musician Seth Timbs. In 1993, talent manager Richard Williams encountered Ella Minopy at a hip-hop club. Finding Timbs and Mahaffey to clash creatively, Williams suggested they split into two separate acts to be managed by him. The three subsequently founded Spongebath Records, with Timbs forming Fluid Ounces, and Mahaffey forming Butter. Once discovering that Butter was already in use by another band, he renamed his project Self, additionally recruiting his brother Mike as a guitarist.

== Writing and production ==
Self performed at Nashville Entertainment Association's annual Extravaganza in February 1995, attracting media attention and interest from multiple major labels. They accepted a recording contract from Zoo Entertainment, additionally acquiring a year-long partnership between Spongebath, Zoo Entertainment, and distributor BMG. By the time of the Self's signing, the band had completed five satisfactory songs from 1994 and was given two months to finish the rest of the album, completing it in May 1995. The project was solely recorded analog, while Mahaffey approached writing with guitar and drums, later recording samples of himself to save on cost. To prevent monotony, Mahaffey aimed to make Subliminal Plastic Motives as diverse as possible by incorporating all of his influences, such as Beastie Boys, Pavement, and Prince. He also prioritized live playability, minimizing the usage of tight synthetic sequences.

The album's opening song, "Borateen", was inspired by a drunk experience during a New Year's Eve celebration, written with intentional ambiguity to refrain from over-explaining. Mahaffey's overwhelmed feelings with the record deal translated into the song "Sophomore Jinx", discussing the fear of being used and staying relevant. In an interview with PiG Publications, he pinpointed its inspiration from a speech by a lawyer about his music. Its lyrics attempt to predict a future he feared, wanting to keep his current life. The topic additionally inspired the song "Mother Nature's Fault". Another song, "Big Important Nothing", was written after Mahaffey watched an interview about Michael Jackson and Lisa Marie Presley on ABC, and instrumentally samples a live performance of Ella Minopy. "Dog You Are" was played by Self in concerts surrounding Subliminal Plastic Motives, instrumentally aligning with other songs from the album and lyrically addressing a critic who reviewed it negatively. It was released on Self's first compilation album, Feels Like Breakin' Shit (1998).

== Release ==
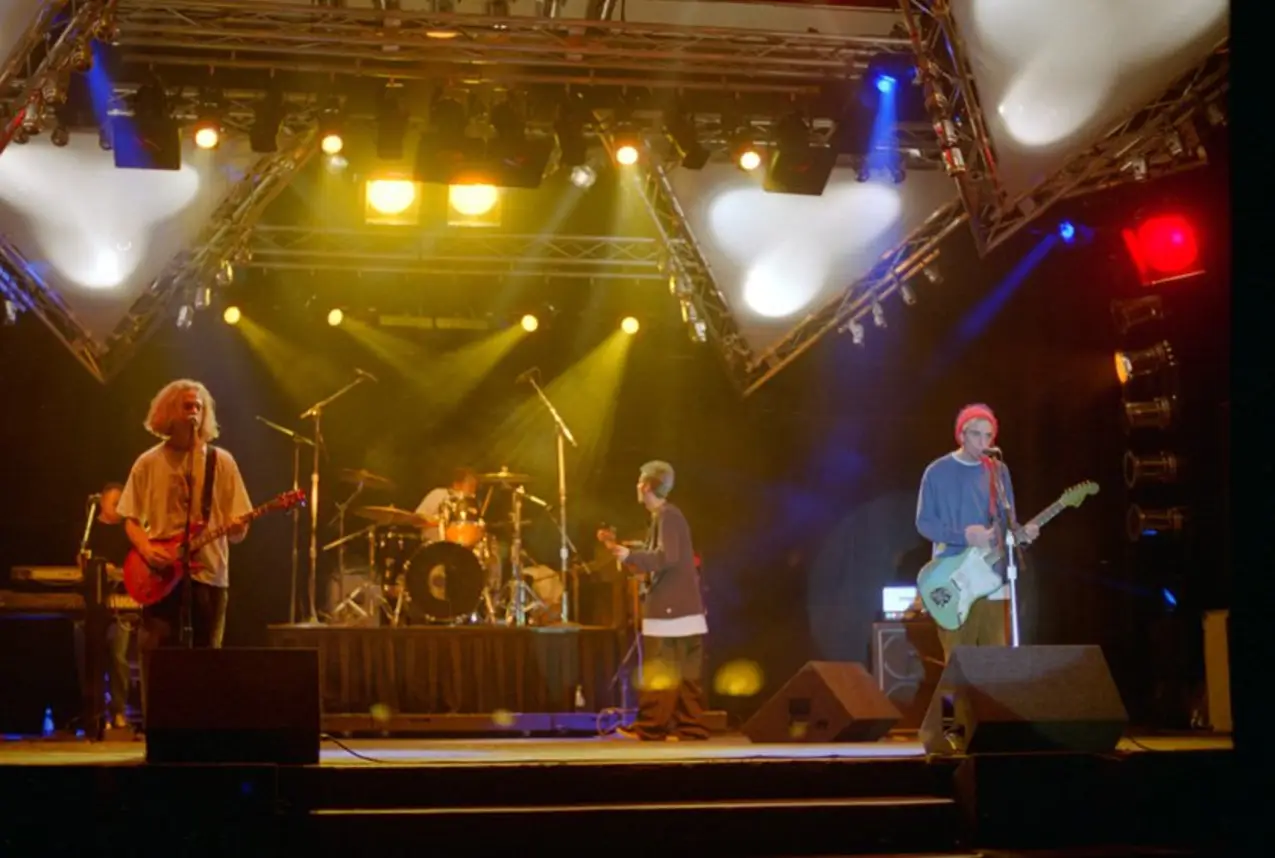
Self whilst on tour with Cracker in 1996.

Subliminal Plastic Motives was announced in September as the first Zoo–Spongebath partnership album to release on October 24, 1995. A release party was held the day before in Nashville, Tennessee. To prepare for the show and future concerts, Self was tasked by Zoo Entertainment to assemble a full live band. They recruited keyboardist Chris James, drummer Jason Rawlings, and bassist Tim Nobles, adopting the former two as main members after the tour. Alongside the album on October 24, the band released their debut single, "Cannon". This was followed by the single "So Low" in early 1996. In August 1997, Billboard reported that the album had sold over 40,000 units via retail.

Both singles received music videos, each directed by Jesse Peretz. They were commercially successful, airing on MTV and boosting the album's radio play, including reception from the station KROQ-FM. In celebration of Subliminal Plastic Motives' twentieth anniversary, the band performed the entire album at the Gramercy Theatre in New York City on January 10, 2014, and the El Rey Theatre in Los Angeles on August 1. The album was issued on vinyl for the first time through Fat Possum Records the same year. On July 30, Self made their TV debut on Jimmy Kimmel Live! by performing "Runaway" and "Lucid Anne". The latter was not broadcast, available exclusively online.

== Reception ==
Professional ratings
Review scores
Source	Rating
AllMusic	4/5 stars
Pitchfork	8/10

The album received positive reviews upon release. Andy Hinds of AllMusic lauded its fusion of post-grunge guitars, inventive sampling, and pop-driven vocals. Ryan Schreiber of Pitchfork likened it to Matthew Sweet's melodic sensibilities with the energy of hip-hop beats and a unique take on power pop. Tom Breihan of Stereogum classed Subliminal Plastic Motives with Beck's style, commend its chopped, eclectic take on rock music. Laurent of Indiepoprock celebrated the album's prevalent energy, hip-hop influences, and jazz elements, declaring it a compelling must-hear record. Michael McCall of Nashville Scene complimented it as expertly crafted, containing rich harmonies with a confident, modern edge. Gabe Besecker of Woof Magazine praised the album's ironic, clever lyrics that balance parody and playfulness, matching its sound with Ween and They Might Be Giants.

Nik Rainey of Lollipop Magazine described it as a blend of Nine Inch Nails and ELO, creating dynamic alternative rock with infectious hooks. Eric Brace of The Washington Post noted the album as a striking debut, showcasing Mahaffey's versatile songwriting and production with sharp lyrics and rhythms reminiscent of Nirvana and Ben Folds while pushing modern rock into new territory. J Noise of Hybrid Magazine additionally made a comparison to Ben Folds and highlighted the album's artwork, but stated that it lacked the standout moments needed to elevate it above its contemporaries. Chuck Campbell of Knoxville News Sentinel praised the rhythmic guitars on "Borateen" and "Stewardess" while stating that the album loses focus as it progresses, pointing out the "disjointed keyboard" of "Big Important Nothing" as an example.

== Track listing ==
All tracks are written by Matt Mahaffey, except where noted.

No.	Title	Writer(s)	Length
1.	"Borateen"		3:05
2.	"Sophomore Jinx"		5:12
3.	"Stewardess"		3:36
4.	"So Low"		4:11
5.	"Marathon Shirt"		4:15
6.	"Lucid Anne"		3:02
7.	"Cannon"		4:01
8.	"Missed the Friction"		2:59
9.	"Superstar"		2:31
10.	"Mother Nature's Fault"		3:35
11.	"Big Important Nothing"		2:43
12.	"Lost My Senses"	Mahaffey; Seth Timbs	3:25
Total length:			42:38

Notes

- "Superstar" is often stylized as "Super★".

== Personnel ==
Self

- Matt Mahaffey – lead vocals, instruments, sampler
- Mike Mahaffey – instruments

Additional musicians

- Brian Rogers – sampler texturing (2), trumpet (5)
- Don Kerce – additional bass (4, 8, 10, 11)
- Chris James (Note: James was not a member of Self until 1996, so he is credited separately on most releases.) – rhodes piano (4)
- Sam Baker – alto saxophone (5)
- Seth Timbs – handclaps (6)

Technical

- Matt Mahaffey – production, mixing engineer
- Bob Ludwig – mastering engineer
- Jim Faraci – mixing engineer, engineer
- Sean McLean – assistant engineer
- Pete Martinez – assistant engineer
- Brian Bottcher – art direction, cover photography
- Jim Harrington – inlay photography

== Charts ==
Chart performance
Chart (1996)	Peak position
Alternative Radio Airplay (CMJ)	64
