= The Plain (band) =

Rock band

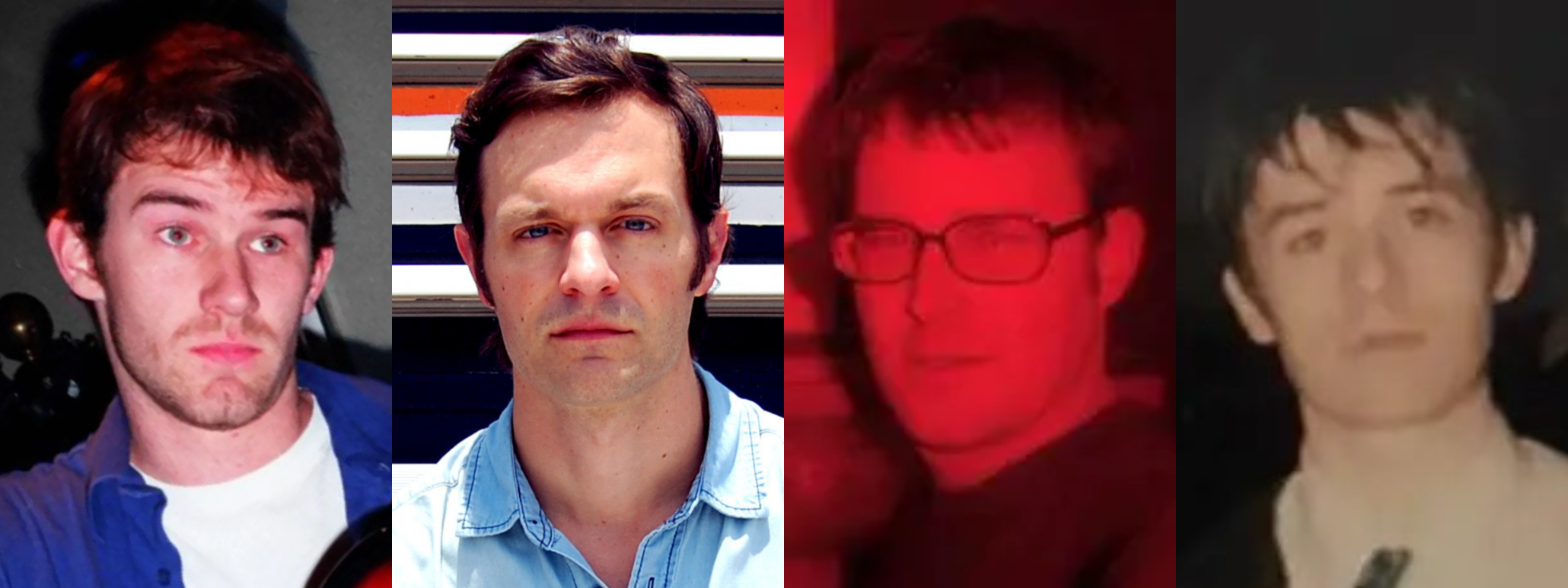
- From left: Mac Burrus, Jason Moore, Swan Burrus, and Justin Meyer

Background information
- Also known as: The Southern Delta Swans (1990–1993)
- Origin: Murfreesboro, Tennessee, U.S.
- Genres: Southern rock; blues; power pop; classic rock
- Years active: 1993–1997
- Spinoffs: The Katies
- Past members: Swan Burrus; Mac Burrus; Justin Meyer; Rob Overbey; Jason Moore

The Plain was an American southern rock band formed in Murfreesboro, Tennessee. Led by vocalist and guitarist Swan Burrus, the Plain toured through the 1990s before breaking up in 1997. Several members would continue to perform and create music, with guitarist Jason Moore forming the American power rock band The Katies and other members joining bands such as Self and Fluid Ounces.

== History ==
=== 1990–1997: Formation and disbandment ===
In the early 1990s, Swan Burrus, Mac Burrus, and Justin Meyer formed the band The Southern Delta Swans in Nashville, Tennessee, influenced by blues artists such as The Black Crowes, The Allman Brothers, and Led Zeppelin. They performed under the name for years, playing at dive bars and pizzerias, talent shows, proms, masonic lodges, parks and house parties. In 1992, they recorded a series of demos at the Famous Music studios in Nashville. The band later recruited Rob Overbey to create a core lineup, changing their name to The Plain and focusing their sound on southern rock with blues, power pop, and classic rock stylings.

By 1994, Swan Burrus had enrolled at Middle Tennessee State University in Murfreesboro, and The Plain subsequently performed free admission shows in venues associated with the university. Their stage design was themed around aviation, with the band wearing pilot uniforms and often opening shows with "The Takeoff Song". The Plain recorded numerous demos, though focused on their live performances rather than releasing material. They continuously toured around Murfreesboro and Nashville with sets longer than two hours, earning a reputation as one of the area's loudest and hardest-rocking bands. Following various lineup changes, including the recruitment of Jason Moore, the Plain disbanded in 1997.

=== 1996–present: Side projects and future work ===
By 1996, Moore had formed the American power rock band the Katies, additionally recruiting Mac Burrus for a short period. In October 1997, Mac joined the band American pop rock band Self, originally auditioning as a horns player before being inducted as a replacement bassist. In November 1998, Meyer joined the American power pop band Fluid Ounces as their drummer, and served as the drum technician for American progressive rock band Coheed and Cambria's album In Keeping Secrets of Silent Earth: 3 (2003). Overbey moved to California, while Swan Burrus continued to play in various bands before eventually moving to Davenport, Iowa.

The Burrus brothers helped compose Self's "Stay Home" for the soundtrack of the film Shrek (2001). Swan subsequently shifted towards commercial jingle work and producing for hip hop artists. In September 2002, Mac and Swan would begin recording music for Swan's debut album, eventually releasing the solo album Swan Songs (2003). By June 2005, Swan had formed a new band. Stickers with the Plain's logo—a green and black decal featuring an outline of an airplane—can be found scattered around Murfreesboro to this day.

== Band members ==
- Swan Burrus – lead vocals, rhythm guitar
- Mac Burrus – lead guitar
- Justin Meyer – drums
- Rob Overbey – bass guitar
- Jason Moore – bass guitar

== See also ==
- Spongebath Records, which several members would end up signing to
