= El Camino Media =

Independent record label

- Founded: 2012; 13 years ago
- Founder: Matt Messer
- Country of origin: United States
- Location: Beverly Hills, California
- Official website: elcaminomedia.com

El Camino Media is an independent record label founded in 2012 and operated by Matt Messer, previously of EMI Music Publishing. The label's first release, issued in 2013, was the album Close Your Eyes by Digital Daggers.

== Label roster ==
=== Current artists ===
- Battleme
- Chief White Lightning
- Louise Post
- Self
- Skating Polly
- Veruca Salt

=== Former artists ===
- The Bixby Knolls
- Digital Daggers
- Pls Pls
