= Chris James (engineer) =

American sound engineer and music producer

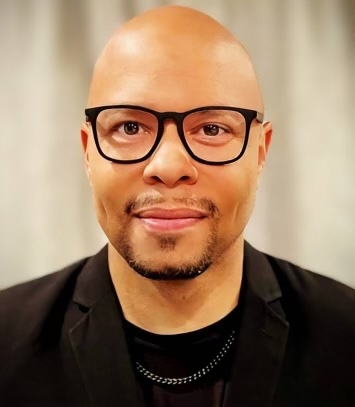

Background information
- Born: Christopher Leon James; Memphis, Tennessee, U.S.
- Origin: Murfreesboro, Tennessee, U.S.
- Genres: Alternative rock; pop; R&B
- Occupations: Audio engineer; record producer; songwriter; musician
- Instrument: Multi-instrumentalist
- Years active: 1993–present
- Labels: NPG; Warner; UMG; Zoo; Spongebath; DreamWorks
- Member of: Self
- Website: chrisjamespro.com

Chris James is an American musician and audio engineer who has worked as a recording engineer and/or mixing engineer for several musical acts. He most frequently collaborates with Prince, with whom he has been nominated for two Grammy Awards, and performs as a keyboardist for the band Self. He currently resides in the Los Angeles, California area.

== Early life ==
Chris James was born in Memphis, Tennessee, moving when he was ten to Maryville, Tennessee. He was educated at Middle Tennessee State University in Murfreesboro with a focus on music and recording.

== Career ==
At college, James shared a dorm room area with Matt Mahaffey, lead member of the band Self. Following the release of their debut album Subliminal Plastic Motives (1995), Mahaffey recruited James for live performances, later being inducted as a full-time member. Playing keyboard and recording several albums for the band, he moved with the group to Los Angeles, California, in 2001 to be closer with their parent label DreamWorks Records. In the area, James opened his own studio named the Archive Studio. He's used the location to work with various artists, including Luther Vandross, Van Hunt, Ne-Yo, Paramore, Miguel, Frank Ocean, Janelle Monáe, and Kings of Leon.

James grew up listening to Prince, inspired by him to write and record songs emulating his style. He began working with the singer in 2012, mixing albums such as Plectrumelectrum (2014) and Art Official Age (2014) at Paisley Park Studios. He additionally performed guitar as part of Prince's live band and toured as a sound engineer. A colleague of James was involved with mixing one of Prince's albums and was unavailable to return to record Hit n Run Phase Two (2015), leading to James' substitution and involvement with the singer's final project before his death.

James later created Dolby Atmos mixes for the concert film Prince and the Revolution: Live (1985), and the albums Diamonds and Pearls (1991), Purple Rain (1984), and Around the World in a Day (1985). He additionally mixed an unreleased demo for "Do Me, Baby", the single "Silver Tongue", and the posthumous album Timeless (2026). At the 59th Annual Grammy Awards, James was nominated in the Best Engineered Album, Non-Classical category for Hit n Run Phase Two, and was again nominated at the 67th Annual Grammy Awards in the Best Historical Album category for the super deluxe edition of Diamonds and Pearls.

== See also ==
- List of people from Memphis, Tennessee
- List of Middle Tennessee State University people
