= Mike Mahaffey =

American guitarist (1967–2005)

- Mahaffey during the release of Breakfast with Girls, 1999.
- Born: Michael Darren Mahaffey; January 21, 1967; Kingsport, Tennessee
- Died: May 25, 2005 (aged 38); Murfreesboro, Tennessee
- Occupation: Musician
- Years active: 1984–2005
- Spouse: Jessica Welsh Mahaffey
- Relatives: Matt Mahaffey (brother)
- Musical career
- Genres: Alternative rock; pop rock; heavy metal
- Instruments: Vocals; guitar; percussion
- Labels: Spongebath; Zoo; DreamWorks; Epic
- Formerly of: Blackfish; Self; Toyz

Michael Darren Mahaffey (January 21, 1967 – May 25, 2005) was an American musician from Kingsport, Tennessee, and a founding member of the American pop rock band Self prior to his death. Before founding Self, he played in several bands, the most successful of which was the Southern Rock band Blackfish. He played lead guitar in the band, but contributed little to the songwriting.

Mahaffey died in his sleep in 2005, and several tribute shows were held in his honor. Mahaffey's band Self went into indefinite hiatus after his death; reuniting in 2014 for the EP Super Fake Nice.

== Early life ==
Mahaffey grew up and was raised in Kingsport, Tennessee, by his parents Donald Martin Mahaffey and Diane Greene Mahaffey.

When he was thirteen years old, Mahaffey picked up the guitar, and began playing with his younger brother Matt at venues. When he was older, his parents had relocated to Murfreesboro. Mahaffey had begun playing with a multitude of local bands around the area, including the band Toyz. Sometime later, he had joined the band Blackfish and began touring around the southern U.S.

== Career ==
=== Blackfish ===
Mahaffey joined the band Blackfish in early 1991, which had originally been the band “the Unknown” prior to 1990, after signing with Epic Records in 1991; the label forced them to change their name. The band settled on the name “Blackfish” and added Mahaffey to their roster. Mahaffey played rhythmic, acoustic, and lead guitars in the band; along with proving backing vocals and the E-bow.

Blackfish released one major-label self-titled album in 1992 before disbanding. The other members of Blackfish were Steve Ballard (guitar & vocals), Chris Reublin (bass guitar) and Andy Howard (drums).

=== Self ===
According to his brother Matt, Mike called him after his band Blackfish broke up; asking if he needed him for anything, Matt asked him to come back to Murfreesboro to collaborate on a project he was making, this resulted in the studio album Subliminal Plastic Motives (1995), released under the name Self. Together with his brother, Self-released two major-label albums and various independent and Internet-only albums. He played lead guitar, keyboards, and bass for the band on various occasions.

After Mahaffey brought musical toys home for his children, Matt was inspired to buy multiple electronic toys on eBay to create the album Gizmodgery (2000) Mahaffey's last released work before his death was ”While the Gangsters Sleep” for Porno, Mint & Grime (2005), contributing backing vocals. Although Mahaffey had contributed to the album Ornament & Crime (2017) in 2003, the sale of DreamWorks Records to Universal Music Group and eventual dissolution of the label left the album indefinitely unreleased.

== Death and legacy ==
Mahaffey died in his sleep of unknown causes on May 25, 2005, his funeral being held a week later. Several tribute shows in his honor were held at the Exit/In in Nashville, Tennessee, with proceeds going towards a college education fund for his children. The first show featured Spongebath alumni the Katies, Fluid Ounces, and the Features, and took place on August 19, 2005. A second show on September 10, 2005, was headlined by a reunited version of Self and also featured the Privates and SJ and the Props. A third show on December 3, 2005, featured John Cowan and various musicians close to Mahaffey. In addition, wristbands were made available for purchase and bore one of his favorite phrases, "It's all good."

=== Annual tribute ===
A group of his friends had continued the tradition started with the December 3, 2005, fundraiser. The Annual Mike Mahaffey Tribute Show was held every first Saturday after Thanksgiving in Johnson City, Tennessee, at Capone's (formerly known as Gatsby's). All proceeds from these shows went to an education fund for his children. The final show was held in 2016.
