= Matt Mahaffey =

American record producer

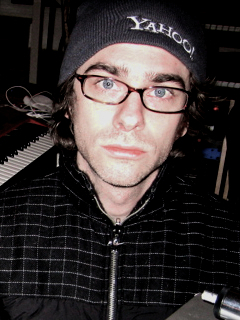
- Mahaffey in his studio in 2007

Background information
- Born: Kingsport, Tennessee, U.S.
- Genres: Alternative rock
- Occupations: Record producer, musician, composer
- Instruments: Vocals, piano, synthesizer, keyboard, programming, guitar, bass guitar, drums
- Years active: 1993–present
- Member of: Self
- Formerly of: Wired All Wrong, Ella Minopy
- Spouse: Leticia Wolf (m. 2020)

Matt Mahaffey is an American multi-instrumentalist, record producer, composer, and recording engineer best known for his band Self and his composer collective Cake in Space.

== Early and personal life ==
Mahaffey grew up in Kingsport, Tennessee and was involved with music from a young age. He started writing songs and playing the drums at age four and would often perform with his brother, Mike Mahaffey, when they were growing up. By age eleven, he was playing drums at Dollywood, Dolly Parton's theme park in Pigeon Forge. In the mid-1990s, he moved to Murfreesboro, Tennessee and attended Middle Tennessee State University. He lived and worked for 10 years in Murfreesboro and co-founded Spongebath Records. He also formed the band Self in 1994. In the early 2000s, Mahaffey relocated from Murfreesboro to Los Angeles, in order to be closer to his record label, Universal Records, and to produce.

He has a daughter with his former wife. As of January 2, 2020, he is married to singer-songwriter Leticia Wolf of Nashville-based band The Dead Deads.

== Work ==
=== Music production ===
Mahaffey has performed with and produced for multiple artists, including Pink, Beck, Liz Phair, Lupe Fiasco, Beyoncé, Butch Walker, Hellogoodbye, Forever the Sickest Kids, Miranda Cosgrove, The White Tie Affair, Keith Urban, The Sounds, L.E.O. and Smash Mouth. In 2005, Mahaffey began producing with Jeff Turzo (God Lives Underwater) under the moniker Wired All Wrong. Wired All Wrong's first full production, Hellogoodbye's Zombies! Aliens! Vampires! Dinosaurs! yielded the platinum single, "Here (In Your Arms)". Mahaffey recently contributed to Lupe Fiasco's certified gold album Lasers, and Beck's Grammy winning Album of the Year 2015, Morning Phase.

=== Performance ===
Mahaffey played various instruments with Beck throughout 2005's Guero tour and 2006's The Information tour. In the past, he has performed with artists such as Mandy Moore and Mika.

=== Film ===
Mahaffey has worked with various film makers including Ivan Reitman, Michael Mann, Jeffrey Katzenberg, Andrew Adamson, & Hans Zimmer (for film score). He wrote "Stay Home" for the Shrek soundtrack, and subsequently produced the music for the surprise endings of Shrek, Shrek 2, and Shrek Forever After. Mahaffey also contributed to the film score of The Boss Baby: Family Business and was the composer for Rise of the Teenage Mutant Ninja Turtles: The Movie and Onyx the Fortuitous and the Talisman of Souls.

=== Television ===
Mahaffey and his brother Mike wrote and performed the infamous Expedia.com tagline. Matt Mahaffey has also written jingles and composed music for Pedigree, Jumbone, Medicare, and Lexus. His music has been featured on numerous shows including CSI: Miami, DanceLife, Entourage, MTV, E! Entertainment, Dirty Sexy Money, Weeds, and 60 Minutes. Mahaffey wrote and produced the music for Nickelodeon's Ni Hao, Kai-Lan. Mahaffey also played the Muppet character "Animal" in a drum-off with Blink-182 drummer, Travis Barker, on Jimmy Kimmel Live!. He provided the Score and Songs for Disney's Henry Hugglemonster, Nickelodeon's Sanjay and Craig, Nella the Princess Knight, Rise of the Teenage Mutant Ninja Turtles, The Barbarian and the Troll, and Middlemost Post, and Netflix's Karma's World and Dogs in Space. Mahaffey has been Emmy and Annie Award-nominated.

== Discography ==
Ella Minopy

- Lower Case G's (1993)

Self

- Subliminal Plastic Motives (1995)
- The Half-Baked Serenade (1997)
- Breakfast with Girls (1999)
- Gizmodgery (2000)
- Ornament & Crime (2017)

Wired All Wrong

- Break out the Battle Tapes (2006)
