= Live at Spaceland Acoustic =

Unreleased live video album by Self

- Mahaffey (left) and Timbs (right) performing

Video by Self
- Released: Unreleased
- Recorded: April 17, 2004
- Venue: Spaceland (Silver Lake)
- Genres: Pop rock; power pop
- Producers: Matt Mahaffey; Britt Daniel

Singles from Live at Spaceland Acoustic
- 1. "I Love To Love Your Love My Love" Released: May 23, 2006; 2. "Back in Black" Released: June 13, 2008

Live at Spaceland Acoustic is an unreleased live video album by the American pop rock band Self, recorded at the American nightclub Spaceland on April 17, 2004. It features acoustic performances by Self frontman Matt Mahaffey and contributors Seth Timbs and Willy Mason. Produced by Mahaffey and Britt Daniel, the video was intended to be released as a DVD, made available for pre-order in April 2008. Its footage of the song "I Love To Love Your Love My Love" and a cover of AC/DC's "Back in Black" were published to YouTube, the latter of which gained popularity online and contributed to Mahaffey's cult following. Live at Spaceland Acoustic was ultimately shelved due to copyright issues involving "Back in Black", remaining unreleased as of 2026.

== Background and performance ==
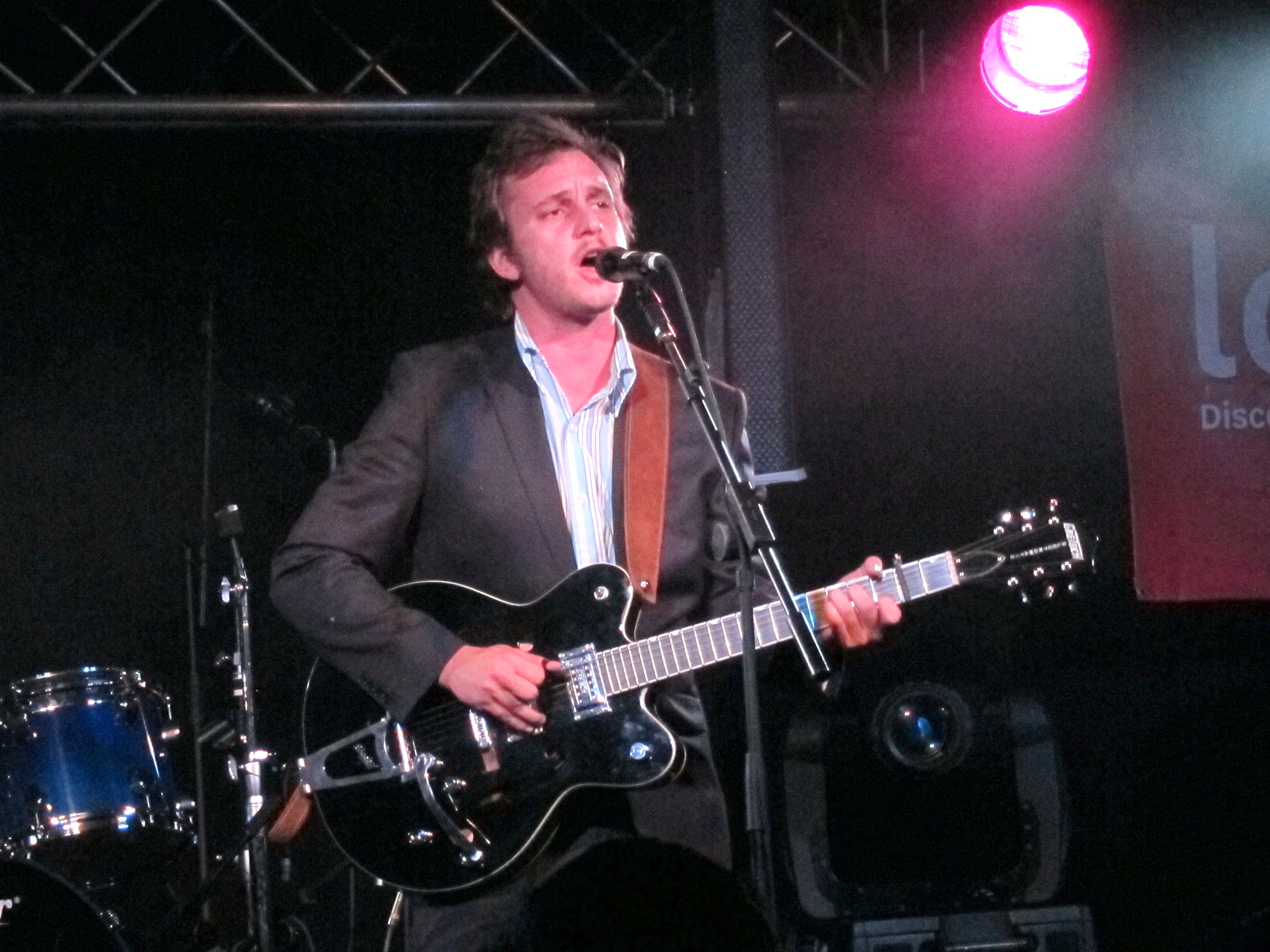
Seth Timbs (left) and Willy Mason (right) performed with Mahaffey.

In May 2000, Self frontman Matt Mahaffey and keyboardist Chris James moved to Los Angeles to work on their fifth studio album, Ornament & Crime (2017). The album suffered from a series of delays that lead to its shelving after the band's label DreamWorks Records was bought and dissolved by Universal Music Group. Self toured throughout Los Angeles during the production of Ornament & Crime, additionally announcing album updates and uploading B-sides to their website until April 2004. On April 7, the American nightclub Spaceland announced that Self would perform at the venue as Britt Daniel's opening act on April 17. The Los Angeles Times announced on April 8 that Spaceland had begun selling tickets to the show, available on the website for Daniel's band Spoon via Ticketweb.

As a fan of Spoon, Mahaffey put together his setlist after being asked to open for him, becoming the first acoustic Self performance. Self was joined on stage by American singer-songwriter Willy Mason, who was concurrently touring with Daniel as another supporting act. Mahaffey performed a cover of AC/DC's song "Back in Black" using an Omnichord and drums during the show, playing both instruments simultaneously with one hand each. He applied guitar distortion to his Omnichord, and forgot some of the song's lyrics while performing it. "I Love to Love Your Love My Love" was additionally performed at the show, featuring musician Seth Timbs of Fluid Ounces on piano.

A.J. Finnman, a contributor for WireImage, photographed the show. Mahaffey continued to perform at Spaceland, collaborating with Jason Falkner and members of The 88 as a part of a Dukes of Stratosphear cover band on July 27. Mahaffey, Timbs and Mason all performed together again at a Brendan Benson benefit concert raising funds for Tennessee veterans and children in December 2013.

== Release ==
In 1999, Self released a music video for the song "Trunk Fulla Amps". In response to the video's lack of MTV airtime, Mahaffey stated plans to create an enhanced CD-DVD for Gizmodgery (2000) with the music video alongside interviews and photos. In an August 2004 WMTS-FM interview, Mahaffey voiced plans to release the Spaceland performance as a DVD, stating he had "so much fun" and expressing interest in playing a short solo acoustic tour. The live video album was entitled Live at Spaceland Acoustic, with initial plans to release it in 2005.

Mahaffey published the show's footage of "I Love to Love Your Love My Love" to YouTube in 2006, while the DVD itself had reportedly been stuck in development hell for over a year by June. Its delay was attributed to the "Back in Black" cover, which the band could not receive permission to release. In February 2007, Spaceland launched its own record label, Spaceland Recordings. Live at Spaceland Acoustic was subsequently made available for pre-order in April 2008, though further copyright concerns led Mahaffey to publish the footage of the "Back in Black" cover to YouTube on June 13. By August, the live video album had been officially shelved.

== Reception ==
Self's "Back in Black" cover became a viral video, with Mahaffey subsequently performing it at the British Motor Corporation's 2009 showcase convention in London. The cover garnered Mahaffey a cult following online, prompting two fans to launch a website archiving his solo works. Writing for The Lonely Socialite, Jakob Dorof called Mahaffey's "Back in Black" cover "fucking killer" and praised the intricately detailed comedy of "Hellglass". Michael Eades of Yewknee held a preconceived disinterest in Self's acoustic sound before watching the video for "I Love To Love Your Love My Love", subsequently changing his mind and remarking he "could definitely get into it." Stephanie Kibbe of Some Kind of Awesome labeled the cover of "Back in Black" an "oldie but a goodie" in 2010, describing the performance as encapsulating Mahaffey's talent.

== Track listing ==
All tracks are written by Matt Mahaffey, except where noted.

No.	Title	Writer(s)	Length
1.	"Stewardess"		3:47
2.	"Microchip Girl"		3:29
3.	"Brooklyn"		4:20
4.	"Paint by Numbers"		2:50
5.	"Coming Over"		3:22
6.	"I Love To Love Your Love My Love"	Matt Mahaffey; Mike Mahaffey; Jason Rawlings; Mac Burrus; Chris James	3:38
7.	"Back in Black"	Angus Young; Malcolm Young; Brian Johnson	2:46

Bonus footage
No.	Title	Writer(s)	Length
8.	"The Making of "Hellglass""	Mahaffey; Seth Timbs; Dan Kilker	3:45
9.	"Trunk Fulla Amps" (Music video)	Mahaffey; Mahaffey; Rawlings; Burrus; James	3:04
10.	"Clap Hands" (TV performance)	Beck Hansen; Mike Simpson; John King	2:47

== Personnel ==
Credits adapted from available footage.

- Matt Mahaffey – lead vocals, omnichord, drums, arrangement
- Seth Timbs – piano, background vocals
- Willy Mason – guitar
- Britt Daniel – production, audio mixing
- Dan Kilker – videographer
