= Spaceland =

Nightclub in Los Angeles, California

Coordinates: 34°5′23.4″N 118°16′5.7″W

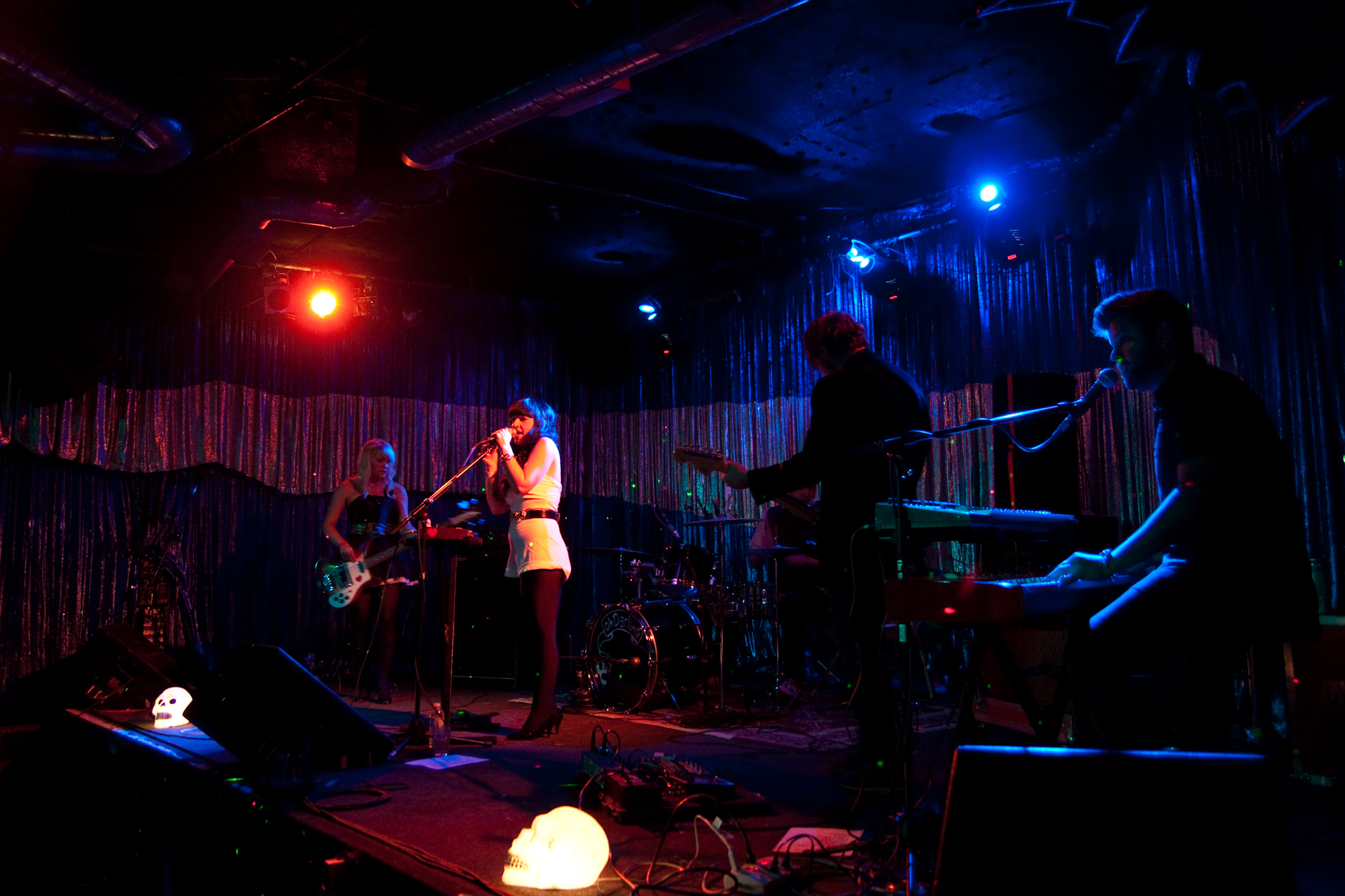
The stage at Spaceland

Spaceland was an alternative rock/indie rock nightclub in the Silver Lake neighborhood of Los Angeles, California, that existed between 1995 and 2011. The club was formerly a popular disco to young locals called Dreams of LA. Spaceland's owner announced the end of the venue in late 2010, with the space continuing to operate under the new name The Satellite.

== History ==
The list of acts who have played Spaceland is quite long, ranging from veteran performers from the 1960s and 1970s like Arthur Lee and The Dictators to current major acts such as Supergrass, Jet, and The White Stripes. It was very important in establishing the Silver Lake scene.

Spaceland is considered "home" for many bands in the so-called Silver Lake "scene" over the years, including Silversun Pickups, 400 Blows, Pine Marten, Radar Bros., The 88, Biblical Proof of UFOs, Patrick Park, etc. The club features as the setting for the fictional band Munchausen By Proxy (lead singer Zooey Deschanel) in the 2008 Jim Carrey movie Yes Man. One of the final bands to play there is the New York Dolls, where they performed a rousing rendition of Bo Diddley's Pills. Photographer Kevin McCarty, in what is described as "advocacy criticism," featured the venue of the Spaceland in a series titled The Chameleon Club. A photo of the stage of the Spaceland, and other empty gay bars, appears in José Esteban Muñoz book Cruising Utopia.

Alternative comedian Neil Hamburger held a regular show at Spaceland the last Sunday of every month, inviting both mainstream (Tom Green, Tim and Eric, Paul F. Tompkins) and obscure acts to perform with him. The show continues at the venue under its new management.

After 17 years, Spaceland came to an end in late 2010 when owner Mitchell Frank decided to open a new space that would focus more on dance and electronic music. Frank's Spaceland Productions would continue to book shows at The Echo/Echoplex complex. Meanwhile, the space at 1717 Silverlake Blvd continued as an indie rock venue in 2011 under the name The Satellite, with shows being booked by former Spaceland booker Jennifer Tefft.

== Spaceland recordings ==
Spaceland Recordings occasionally published live albums recorded at the club.

=== Live albums ===
- The Drones - Live in Spaceland - February, 2007
- White Rabbits - Live [In Spaceland - June 13, 2007]
- Liam Finn - Live in Spaceland - February 22, 2008
- Self - Live at Spaceland Acoustic - April, 2008
- Darker My Love - Mondays in Spaceland, 2006

== Notable performers ==
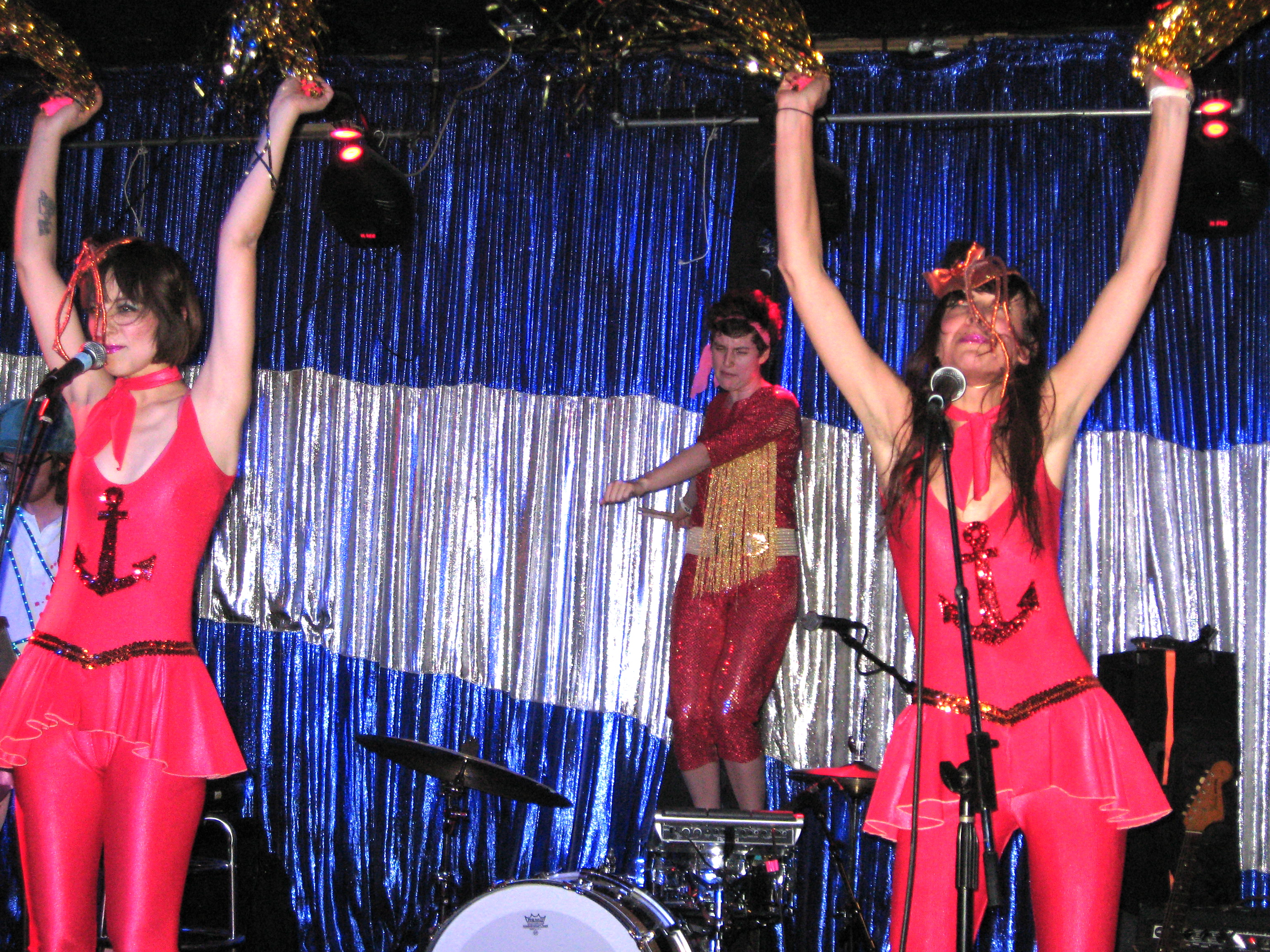
Electrocute performing at Spaceland

- The 88 (Monday, July 22, 2002)
- The Abe Lincoln Story
- 400 Blows
- Air Traffic
- The Airborne Toxic Event
- Allegro
- Arcade Fire (Tuesday, December 7, 2004)
- Arctic Monkeys
- At the Drive-In
- Amy Winehouse
- Babyland (Monday, May 5, 2003)
- The Bangles Sept 2000
- Beck
- Bell Gardens (Friday, March 26, 2010)
- Bad Poetry Minute
- Biblical Proof of UFOs (Thursday, June 20, 2002)
- Bigelf (Thursday, May 13, 2004)
- The Bravery
- The Brian Jonestown Massacre
- Burning Brides (Monday, February 28, 2005)
- The Business Machines (Thursday, April 8, 2004)
- Capsula
- Cake
- Cibo Matto
- The Clientele
- Creeper Lagoon
- Damo Suzuki and Mikael Karoli
- Death Cab for CutieDaniel Lanois
- The Decemberists
- Deftones
- Dinosaur Jr
- The Dismemberment Plan
- The Drones
- Elliott Smith
- Extra Fancy
- Fastball
- Ferdinand
- Fiction Company (Sept. 19, 2010)
- Fleet Foxes
- The Fling
- Fluorescein
- Fitz and the Tantrums (2009)
- Fojimoto (Wednesday, November 3, 2003)
- Foo Fighters
- Frank Black
- Fu Manchu
- Furry Things
- The Fuzztones
- George Ellias (Tuesday, June 24, 2009)
- Guided by Voices
- The Hi-Fives
- Hopewell
- Icebird
- JJ Paradise Players Club
- James (Saturday, June 6, 2008)
- John Fahey
- Julian Casablancas (Tuesday, November 3, 2009)
- Jurassic 5
- KaitO
- The Killers
- Komeda
- Kryptonite Nixon
- Kittens for Christian (Thursday, April 8, 2004)
- Lady Gaga (Dive Bar Tour)
- Les Savy Fav
- Local Natives
- Lutefisk
- Mala Leche
- Malcolm Mooney
- Mark Ronson
- Miss Spiritual Tramp of 1948
- Modest Mouse
- Mudhoney
- Nebula
- The Negro Problem
- Neutral Milk Hotel
- Of Montreal
- Orange Goblin (Thursday, May 13, 2004)
- Or, The Whale (Friday, May 28, 2010)
- Patrick Park (Monday, January 20, 2003)
- Pine Marten (Friday, May 23, 2003)
- Pavement
- Pleasure Forever (Friday, March 1, 2002)
- Popular Girl
- Possum Dixon
- ? and the Mysterians (August 29, 1998)
- Quasi
- R.L Burnside
- Radar Bros. (Friday, May 23, 2003)
- The Raveonettes
- The Red Aunts
- The Rentals
- Richard Sinclair (February 29, 2004 leap year!)
- Rilo Kiley
- Rivulets (Friday, May 23, 2003)
- Rocket from the Crypt
- The Rogers Sisters (Monday, January 20, 2003)
- Rubyfish
- Scarling.
- Self
- Seneca Hawk
- Shiner
- The Shins
- Six Volt Sunbeam
- The Thrills (Wednesday November 7, 2007)
- Shack (Tuesday, September 26, 2003)
- Silversun Pickups (Monday, July 22, 2002)
- Skeleteen
- Soviet (August, 2003)
- The Smiths Indeed
- Snow Patrol
- Spacehog
- The Spinto Band
- Stew (musician)
- Throwing Muses
- Totimoshi (Monday, May 5, 2003)
- Useless Keys
- V3
- Velouria
- Visionaries
- VLA
- Ween
- Weezer
- The White Stripes
- Will Haven (Wednesday, July 23, 2003)
- Wondermints
- Yob (Wednesday, July 23, 2003)
- Zoobombs

== See also ==
- The Echo
