= The Seal Cub Clubbing Club =

English post-punk band

- The Seal Cub Clubbing Club

Background information
- Origin: The Wirral, England
- Genres: Indie rock, Post-punk revival
- Years active: 2003-2012
- Past members: Simon Stephens; Nik Glover; Andy Thompson; John Biddle; Jay Freeman; Andy Rostron
- Website: Official website

The Seal Cub Clubbing Club were a five-piece post-punk band from The Wirral, England.

The band had been described by Gigwise.com as sounding like "The Coral on acid", also being compared to Echo & the Bunnymen. CityLife magazine suggested that the band were inspired by The Fall or Kid A-era Radiohead. They have also been compared to Super Furry Animals.

== History ==
As friends of friends at school in The Wirral, The Seal Cub Clubbing Club started off playing Prog-Reggae, a Black Rebel Motorcycle Club cover and just 'jamming' in 2003. Their first gig, on a beach in West Kirby, was ended abruptly after only half-an-hour due to a power failure.

Their name, a mendacity as Seal infants are called pups not cubs, was an effort to get away from usual one word-searching through the dictionary names that are often used by bands. According to an interview with the band by Steve Lamacq on BBC Radio 1, the name simply came from something a friend had said when the band was looking for a name.

Their first EP, Number One In A Serious, was released in January 2005 on their own mini record label, Boon(e). Containing "Why Don't You Fix It?" and "Slow-Motion Powerslides (in Dee)", it was placed in the recommended section of Rough Trade Records and received airplay from Steve Lamacq.

A second EP, the five-track The Seal Cub Clubbing Club EP was released on Nomadic in November 2005 following a UK tour in support of Brakes. It gained positive reviews from the Channel 4 website and Rough Trade Records.

The Seal Cub Clubbing Club EP II, a more poppy effort than their previous releases, was released on Nomadic in March 2006. Lead track "Celine" was notable for receiving nationwide airplay and being written "for NME audiences so they don't cry".

In August 2006, The Seal Cub Clubbing Club played the Leeds Festival early in the afternoon on the Comedy stage. In September they toured the UK in support of British Sea Power. They have also toured with The Fall, Brakes, Juliette Lewis, and Clinic.

The single "World of Fashion" was released in November 2006 on Nomadic receiving airplay from Steve Lamacq and Huw Stevens on BBC Radio 1. This was followed by nationwide headlining tour and then a tour in support of Black Wire.

An album was recorded in a country house in France, during summer 2006 and was ready for release in Spring 2007 according to their interview in Kruger Magazine issue 12. According to the flyer for the summer 2007 tour supporting The Smiths Indeed, the album was to be called Super Science Fiction. However, due to contractual wrangles with Nomadic Music, and the subsequent collapse of the label, the album was delayed, finally being released in 2009. In April 2008 the band finally left Nomadic Music, not long after the release of Number Three In A Serious, which was put out on the band's own Boon(e) Records label. The lead track on this release was "May", and a video for the b-side "Tin Drum", a re-edited short film about a man who compulsively attends the funerals of strangers, appeared on YouTube. The band were nominated for an XFM 'Newcomer of the Year' award and performed at the T in the Park festival, and also recorded a session for Marc Riley's BBC 6 Music show.

In November and December 2008, members of the band supported the launch of DING>>DONG - the final exhibition of the year during the European Capital of Culture programme at the Foundation for Art and Creative Technology.

In 2010, the band released Royal Variety. The album was made 6 Music's 'Album of the Day' and received strong airplay from regular supporter Marc Riley. The band returned to record another two sessions for the DJ in the same year. In the final of the three sessions the band said that they were "rubbish" live and claimed that working full-time jobs had restricted their ability to practice and gig. In the same interview they revealed that the second single from Royal Variety would be chosen by a public vote.

The band ran their own book club, bringing books to gigs for fans to borrow or swap.

In March 2012, the band announced on their official Facebook page that they had split up.

Since 2011, Nik and Jay from the band have been releasing material with their new project, The Loved Ones, which also features musicians Rich Hurst and Ben Shooter.

== Discography ==
=== Albums ===
- Super Science Fiction (2009), Tritone
- Royal Variety (2010), Jack to Phono

=== EPs ===
- Number One In A Serious (2005), Boon(e)
- The Seal Cub Clubbing Club EP (2005), Nomadic
- The Seal Cub Clubbing Club EP II (2006), Nomadic

=== Singles ===
- "World Of Fashion" (2006), Nomadic
- "Number Three In A Serious" (2008), Boon(e)
- "Dawn Lamb" (2009), Jack to Phono
