= Gizmodgery =

2000 studio album by Self

Studio album by Self
- Released: September 5, 2000; April 25, 2001 (Japan)
- Recorded: 1998–May 2000
- Studios: Bennett House (Franklin); Matt's Old House (Murfreesboro)
- Genres: Power pop; art rock; new wave; soft grunge; chiptune
- Length: 42:11
- Label: Spongebath
- Producer: Matt Mahaffey

Self chronology
Brunch (1999)	Gizmodgery (2000)	Self Goes Shopping (2000)

Alternate cover
- 2001 Japanese cover art

Singles from Gizmodgery
- 1. "Trunk Fulla Amps" Released: 1999

Gizmodgery (Japanese: ギズモジェリ, Hepburn: Gizumojeri) is the fourth studio album by the American pop rock band Self, released on September 5, 2000, by Spongebath Records. Recorded entirely with toy instruments, its music was written and composed by their frontman, Matt Mahaffey, with the band's other members contributing to select songs. The album's sole single, "Trunk Fulla Amps", received a music video and television commercial, whilst the song "Dead Man" became a sleeper hit in the early 2020s.

Gizmodgery received generally positive reviews upon its release, discussing its unique production and playful energy, with Self's cover of "What a Fool Believes" (originally by Kenny Loggins and popularized by the Doobie Brothers) receiving consistent praise. Commercially, Gizmodgery sold over 13,000 copies in its first week and peaked near the top of multiple CMJ charts. The album was distributed in Japan by Avex Inc. in 2001, and on vinyl through El Camino Media in 2015. Various cut songs and b-sides were later released on their second compilation album, Selfafornia (2001).

== Background ==
In 1995, Self was given the cover page of an issue of Virtually Alternative after the release of the project's debut album Subliminal Plastic Motives. Within the magazine, frontman Matt Mahaffey spoke about wanting to create an album solely with toy instruments, a concept last attempted by Pianosaurus in their 1987 album Groovy Neighborhood. He was additionally inspired by The Moog Cookbook (1996) and At Home with the Groovebox (1999). Matt's older brother, Mike Mahaffey, later bought musical toys for his children, which sparked Matt to purchase more through eBay and begin developing the toy album. He chose to do the project independently, feeling less constrained with his label Spongebath Records compared to prior major label albums, although DreamWorks Records expressed interest in publishing the album.

== Production ==
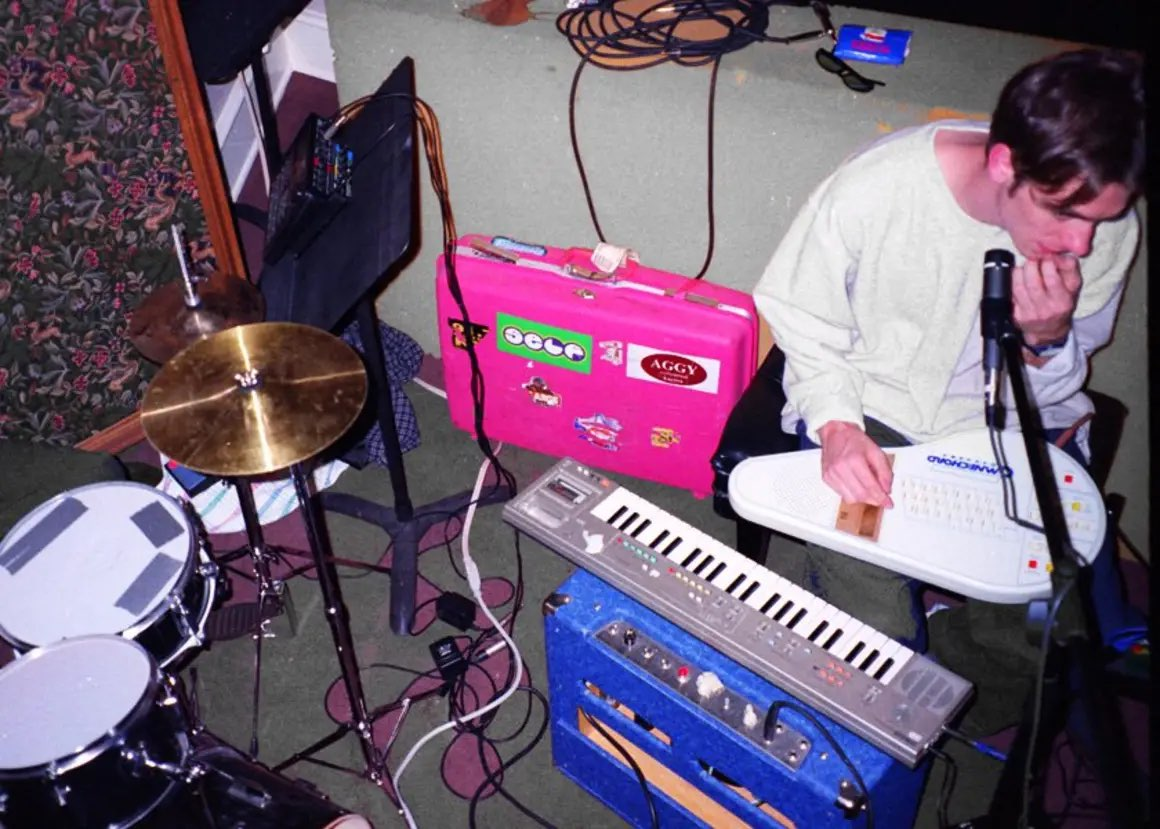
Mahaffey during the recording of Gizmodgery in 1998.

Toy instruments such as the one-string Mattel star guitar made chord assembly arduous, requiring each note to be played one at a time. On the back of physical copies, Mahaffey compiled a list of all toys used for Gizmodgery, including a Schoenhut toy piano. Cheryl Botchick of CMJ noted of these that the listed six-string electric guitar produced by Vox "could be construed as a rule bender". Mahaffey recorded the album with a condenser microphone, equalizing the audio with Pro Tools to fix abundant mid-range frequencies. "5 Alive", "Pattycake", and "Hi, My Name's Cindy" additionally used Logic Pro, which required Mahaffey to manually rearrange hundreds of separate stems from Pro Tools to mix the songs. The latter's files were lost during this process, resulting in its final version being a rough mix. "Trunk Fulla Amps" and "Ordinaire" required multiple takes due to recording errors involving their bass guitar and drums, respectively. Alongside "I Love to Love Your Love My Love" and "Suzie Q Sailaway", these four songs were written together in one day.

Self additionally worked on Breakfast with Girls (1999), an album planned to be released through DreamWorks, while making Gizmodgery. Mahaffey wrote and recorded "Suzie Q Sailaway" for inclusion on the latter, but was requested by the label to put it on the former. He re-recorded the song with a full band, wishing to contain toy songs to Gizmodgery. This process delayed the release of Breakfast with Girls, which, combined with the track's shift in style, led to a retroactive dissatisfaction. Self was proposed by Count Bass D to record a cover of the Doobie Brothers' song "What a Fool Believes" during the album's creation, but the collaboration never came to fruition. Mahaffey later recorded the cover independently, drawn to creating large chords with small instruments. The song was constructed in a non-C major key to add variation to the album.

== Music and lyrics ==
=== Style and influences ===
"What a Fool Believes"
A 26-second sample of "What a Fool Believes" by Self, in which parts of the first pre-chorus and chorus are heard

Gizmodgery uses a power pop/rock soundscape with elements of new wave. In addition to being an early representation of soft grunge, it also takes influence from artists such as Prince, Lenny Kravitz, and Queen. Mahaffey consistently labeled Gizmodgery as an "exercise in recording", and called the album a "lot of fun" to make. The majority of the vocals in Gizmodgery are performed in a feminine manner, characterized by a high level of energy.

"5 Alive" consists of an intro featuring a cacophony of background noises, later complemented by aesthetically pleasing vocals, all while incorporating an element of pop music. "Chameleon" is predominantly made up of a repeating drum loop accompanied by distorted sounds. The publication The O'Colly described "Chameleon" as "surprisingly dark," while Alex Steininger from In Music We Trust referred to it "as close as anyone will ever get to creating pop-industrial-electronica." "Pattycake" is sung in a falsetto reminiscent of soul music. "Ordinaire" incorporates unconventional and eccentric rhythms, alongside alarm sounds similar to that of the American new wave band Devo. "9 Lives" is presented in the style of a punk song and evokes elements of psychedelic music. While "I Love To Love Your Love My Love" is a parody of popular doo-wop songs, and features a piano ballad.

=== Lyrics ===
The opening track, "I Am A Little Explosion", begins with a toy doll stating "Let’s play some music!", before the song starts. "Chameleon" is characterized by a recurring vocal verse, which also incorporates a sample of a drunken man speaking nonsensically. "Dead Man", is written from the perspective of a man dealing with mortality issues, coping with the stress of everyday life by using black comedy as a relief method. Following, "Trunk Fulla Amps" was written humorously, as the band considered it ironic that a song created solely with toy instruments could contain significant profanity. The lyrics repeatedly state, "Got a trunk fulla amps, motherfucker", and reference several artists by name, including Freddie Mercury and the Electric Light Orchestra. Mahaffey remarked that after writing the first verse of the song: "—the flood gate opened and the 'f' word flew freely."

"Pattycake" interpolates the nursery rhyme Miss Lucy had a steamboat, and "Hi, My Name’s Cindy" revolves around a man who ends up on a blind date with a literal blind woman. The twelfth track, "I Love To Love Your Love My Love" is written in the style of a Jellyfish song, and narrates a High school prom.

== Artwork ==
The cover artwork of Gizmodgery depicts a boy viewing a General Electric Show'N Tell, featuring a skeletal ultrasound fetus whose umbilical cord is connected to a microphone. The fetus featured on the cover is available on display at the Museum Vrolik in Amsterdam. Unlike the majority of Self's previous releases, the artwork for Gizmodgery was created by Kii Arens. New artwork was created for the Japanese release. Gizmodgery features unique artwork for every song on the album, similar to that of Self's debut Subliminal Plastic Motives (1995). An icon is used to represent each song on the CD and booklet.

== Release ==
Gizmodgery's marketing campaign included television advertisements, a first for Self.

Gizmodgery was released through Spongebath Records on September 5, 2000, and appeared in retail stores by October 31. Issued exclusively on HDCD, copies were packaged with a parental advisory sticker on the front due to the song "Trunk Fulla Amps", which repeats the word "motherfucker" a total of 18 times. Gizmodgery was not available at Walmart, as the company refuses to stock albums featuring parental advisory stickers. Few concerts were connected to the album's release, limited by the extensive cost of batteries required to power the toy instruments, only consisting of an album release party in Murfreesboro, a performance at Sebastian's on September 8, and at Opry Mills' Tower Records store on September 9. Mike Mahaffey created chiptune remixes of older songs to lead the band on stage during performances, with plans to release it through DreamWorks Records. It was instead released on Spongebath's website after Self's tour ended as their second EP Self Goes Shopping (2000).

Extra goodies were included in copies of Gizmodgery's Japanese edition.

In 1999, Michael Simpson of the Dust Brothers remixed the toy recording of "Suzie Q Sailaway", which Mahaffey preferred over the original version. It was released on July 27, 2001, as part of the compilation album Selfafornia. It included other cut songs from Gizmodgery's recording sessions, with "Resurrect" as its final track. A music video for "Trunk Fulla Amps" directed by Reed Ridley was released in February 2001. It was intended to be broadcast for MTV's "Indie Day", but the band did not qualify due to their contract with DreamWorks. Self produced a 30-second advertisement consisting of a comically edited version of the music video, which aired during the Super Bowl XXXV in select areas of the east coast, alongside the 2000 MTV Video Music Awards. Both videos were available for download from Spongebath's website.

A Japanese edition of Gizmodgery was released on April 25, 2001, by Avex Inc, with the songs "Dead Man" and "I Love To Love Your Love My Love" being available for download from their Japanese website. It included the bonus track "Resurrect", alongside new artwork created by Fujita Blender of Hyppopotamus Graphics. Mahaffey travelled to Japan to promote the album, partaking in a photo shoot taken by Daisuke Fujisawa and 18 different interviews for various Japanese music outlets, with plans to tour Japan in August 2001. Each purchase included a poster, a sticker, and a ticket to enter a contest in which 50 people received a toy used whilst creating the album. Celebrating its 15th anniversary, the album was re-issued through El Camino Media on September 11, 2015, available as a digital download and physically as a blue vinyl.

== Reception ==
Professional ratings
Review scores
Source	Rating
AllMusic	4/5 stars
The Daily Nebraskan	4/4 stars
Dead On The Web	8/10 stars
LMNOP	5/6 stars
Pitchfork	6.9/10
RockZone	A+
Portland Press Herald	A

The album received largely positive reviews upon release. Steve Huey of AllMusic gave the album a rating of 4/5, complimenting its detailed production against cheap toys and Mahaffey's "playful, often kitschy sense of humor". Andrew Shaw of The Daily Nebraskan rated Gizmodgery 4 out of 4 stars, hailing the production and complete soundscapes achieved with the toys. Spencer Owen of Pitchfork criticized the project's stylistics derivations and the noisiness of "5 Alive" and "Chameleon" while lauding the fun energy presented in other tracks, rating it a 6.9/10. The album was reviewed more positively by Samuel Barker of RockZone, calling it a "good mix of old style funk with a dose of new age pop" and giving it an A+ grade. Steven Fievet of LMNOP followed with a rating of 5 out of 6 stars, classifying the album as "toy pop" and magnifying its mix of lighthearted and serious undertones. Ryan Peters of Portland Press Herald graded Gizmodgery an A, praising its tasteful mix of contrasting pop elements and Mahaffey's ability to avoid relying on a gimmick.

Amy Phillips of The Village Voice positively reviewed the album's youthful themes, classing "Pattycake" as its best song. Mark Woodlief of CMJ shared similar sentiment, admiring Mahaffey's production and comparing his experimental songwriting to Wayne Coyne of the Flaming Lips. Scott Hefflon of Lollipop Magazine likened the song "I Love To Love Your Love My Love" to the Beatles and Jellyfish, commending its harmonies and doo-wop composition. J Noise of Hybrid Magazine equated Mahaffey's guitar work throughout Gizmodgery to Brian May's, admiring the diverse combination of genres and stating a resemblance to Beck's Odelay (1996). Carlos Ramirez of No Echo was pleased by Mahaffey's choice not to emulate the original singing style of "What a Fool Believes", enjoying its synthetic buoyancy. Jeff Brown of The Pitch additionally approved "What a Fool Believes" and the varied moods of Gizmodgery, ranking the album as one of the best of 2000. Bill Ribas of NY Rock held a similar ranking for the year, favoring "Trunk Fulla Amps" for its similarities to David Bowie's Scary Monsters (and Super Creeps) (1980). Ron Rollins of Dayton Daily News praised the album's energy and quirk, while Ben Wener of The Orange County Register complimented its craftiness and use of childhood imagery.

== Legacy ==
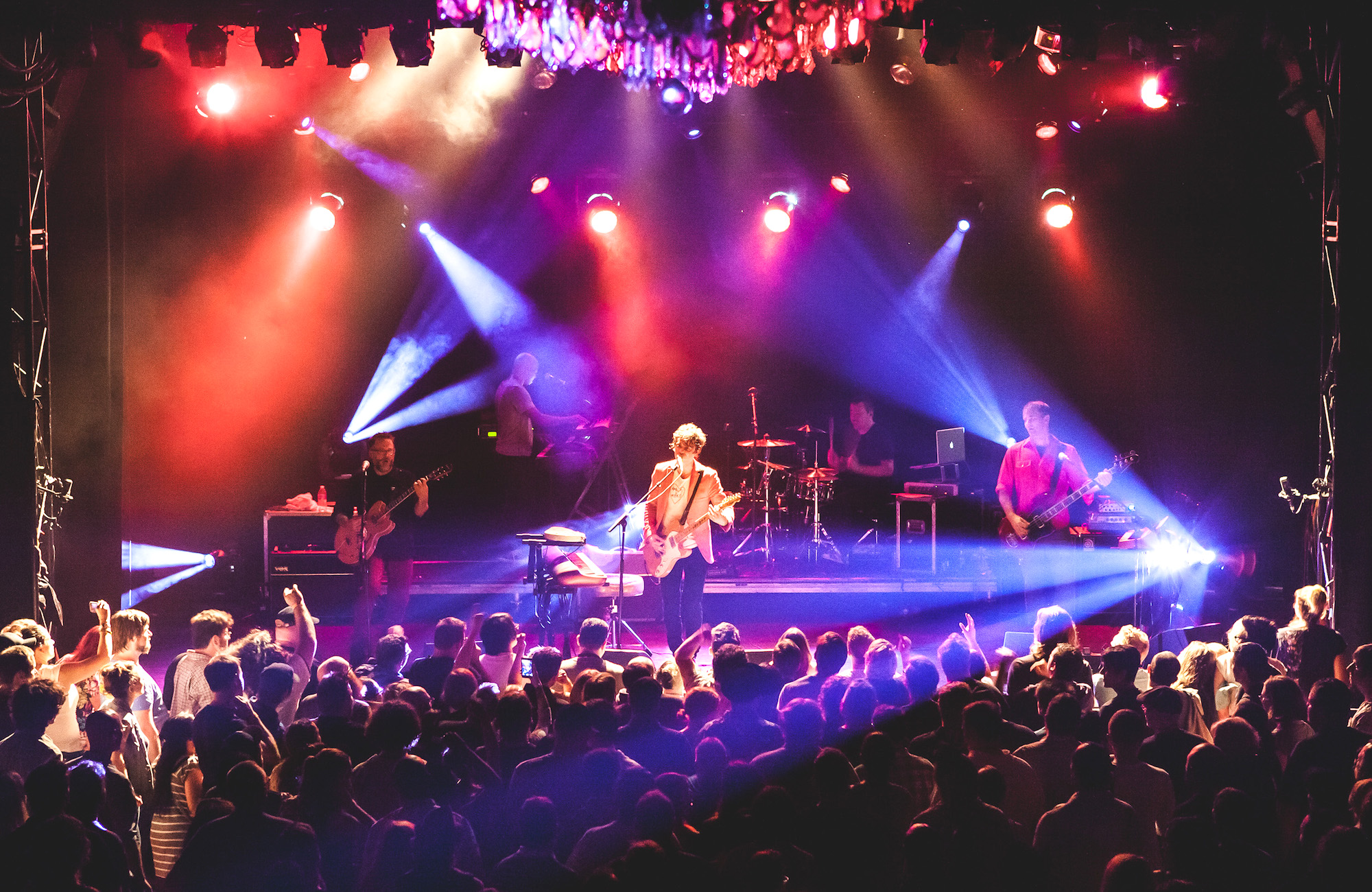
Self, pictured in 2014, received consistent music work after the release of Gizmodgery.

Shortly after completing the album in May 2000, both Mahaffey and keyboardist Chris James moved to Los Angeles in order to be closer to the bands' major label, DreamWorks Records, followed by bassist Mac Burrus moving to San Diego in September, with plans to release their fifth studio album Ornament & Crime (2017) by Summer 2001. Mahaffey said he planned to return to alternative rock, and did not see a return to Self's previous sound. Their home label, Spongebath Records, collapsed shortly after the band left. Mahaffey has remained positive about the album, telling Vice in 2014 that he still received praise for the album, remarking "I’d never do it again, but it was a good exercise."

J.P. Grant of The A.V. Club compared the "toy" gimmick of the 2011 video game Toy Soldiers: Cold War to that of Gizmodgery’s, praising both for "transcending its gimmick with its solid fundamentals." In the early 2020s, "Dead Man" and "What a Fool Believes" became sleeper hits, rising in popularity on Spotify long after their release. "What a Fool Believes" was used in the first episode of the Netflix series FUBAR in 2023. "Dead Man" gained larger popularity after Spotify's AI algorithm began to promote it alongside songs by indie rock artists Lemon Demon and Tally Hall, additionally being used in an episode of Tally Hall's internet show in 2011, with fans of the band confusing it for a new Tally Hall song. The song "Trunk Fulla Amps" was featured in the final season of Weeds, additionally becoming a regular staple of Self's live performances.

== Commercial performance ==
Gizmodgery was commercially successful for Self, with 5,000 units being sold via pre-order. In its first week, the band sold 5,000 more units through Spongebath, with an additional 3,000 distributed through retail stores. It debuted at number 198 on the CMJ Radio 200 chart on October 2, 2000. It received 87 radio adds for the week, ranking number 3 in Radio 200 adds and number 5 in adult alternative adds. It jumped 183 positions the following week, and reached number 8 on November 13. It additionally peaked at number 12 on CMJ's Internet Broadcast chart, number 10 on CMJ's Core Radio chart, number 9 on CMJ's Alternative Radio Airplay chart, and number 4 on the CMJ Top 200. On January 26, 2020, the track "What a Fool Believes" peaked at number 69 on the Radio Top 100 Alternative Songs chart in Japan.

== Track listing ==
All tracks are written by Matt Mahaffey, except where noted.

No.	Title	Writer(s)	Length
1.	"I Am a Little Explosion"		3:35
2.	"5 Alive"		3:09
3.	"Chameleon"		2:53
4.	"Dead Man"		3:03
5.	"Trunk Fulla Amps"	Matt Mahaffey; Mike Mahaffey; Jason Rawlings; Mac Burrus; Chris James	3:24
6.	"Pattycake"	Matt Mahaffey; Rawlings; Burrus	4:05
7.	"Ordinaire"	Mahaffey; Mahaffey; Rawlings; Burrus; James	3:22
8.	"Miracle Worker"		2:02
9.	"Hi, My Name's Cindy"		2:29
10.	"What a Fool Believes"	Michael McDonald; Kenny Loggins	3:42
11.	"9 Lives"		2:33
12.	"I Love To Love Your Love My Love"	Mahaffey; Mahaffey; Rawlings; Burrus; James	4:23
13.	"Trunk Fulla Amps" (radio edit)	Mahaffey; Mahaffey; Rawlings; Burrus; James	3:26
Total length:			42:11

Japanese edition
No.	Title	Length
14.	"Resurrect" (bonus track)	3:22
Total length:		45:33

Notes

- On physical releases, "Miracle Worker" is stylized as "Miracleworker" and "I Love To Love Your Love My Love" as "ilovetoloveyourlovemylove".

== Personnel ==
Credits adapted from the album's liner notes.

Musicians

- Matt Mahaffey – lead vocals, instruments
- Mike Mahaffey – guitar (10), instruments (5, 7, 12, 13)
- Mac Burrus – instruments (5, 7, 12, 13)
- Chris James – instruments (5, 7, 12, 13)
- Jason Rawlings – instruments (5, 7, 12, 13)

Technical

- Chris James – mixing engineer
- Tom Baker – mastering engineer
- Matt Mahaffey – engineer (1–4, 6, 8–11, 14)
- Shawn McLean – engineer (5, 7, 12, 13)
- Kii Arens – package design
- Fuzita Blender – Japanese package design
- Daisuke Fujisawa – Japanese photography
- Kozaburo Sakamoto – Japanese photography

== Charts ==
Weekly chart performance for Gizmodgery
Chart (2000–2001)	Peak position
Alternative Radio Airplay (CMJ)	9
CMJ Radio 200	8
CMJ Top 200	4
Core Radio (CMJ)	10
Internet Broadcast (CMJ)	12
