= Foreign Legion (album) =

2001 album by power pop band Fluid Ounces

Studio album by Fluid Ounces
- Released: October 24, 2001
- Recorded: 2000–January 2001
- Studio: Alive Recording Studio (Setagaya)
- Genres: Power pop; indie rock; shibuya-kei
- Labels: Cutting Edge, Raygun
- Producer: Chuck Pfaff

Fluid Ounces chronology
In the New Old-Fashioned Way (1999)	Foreign Legion (2001)	The Whole Shebang (2004)

Singles from Foreign Legion
- 1. "Beautiful Days / CITY LIGHTS" Released: February 16, 2016

Foreign Legion is the third studio album by the American power pop band Fluid Ounces, released on October 24, 2001, by Avex Records exclusively in Japan, with an eventual American release in February 2002. Foreign Legion was hard to find physically, eventually leading the band to release it for free online. It received positive reviews from critics, with "Poet Tree" becoming a favorite. Fluid Ounces additionally collaborated with the Japanese shibuya-kei musician Fantastic Plastic Machine on the song "CITY LIGHTS", which was used in a Japanese television show, and received multiple releases. Fluid Ounces broke up shortly after Foreign Legion's release.

== Background ==
In 1999, Fluid Ounces left Spongebath Records, which had published the band's entire discography up to that point. Lead member and pianist Seth Timbs recorded a song entitled "Destined To Be Forgotten" with Matt Mahaffey in 2000, with plans to include it on the then upcoming Foreign Legion. It was later released on Fluid Ounces' fourth studio album The Whole Shebang (2004).

Fluid Ounces also recorded two songs with the Japanese shibuya-kei musician Fantastic Plastic Machine, "Invincible Boy" and "CITY LIGHTS", with the latter also being released on Fantastic Plastic Machine's sixth compilation album Contact (2001). Timbs additionally wrote the songs "Show On The Road" and "Encyclopedia Brown" for guitars, but later converted them for piano use. Fluid Ounces broke up shortly after Foreign Legion released, with Timbs moving to Los Angeles in 2002.

== Release ==
Foreign Legion was released exclusively in Japan on October 24, 2001, by Avex Inc, who had previously released their second studio album In the New Old-Fashioned Way (1999) in Japan earlier that year. The Japanese edition of the album featured exclusive unreleased songs, including a cover of Thomas Dolby's song "She Blinded Me with Science". After Foreign Legion's release, Fluid Ounces made several appearances in Japan.

Foreign Legion did not receive an American release until February 26, 2002, (Note: The Fluid Ounces website claimed a release date of March 5, 2002.) released by Raygun Records. Copies of Foreign Legion were extremely hard to find, leading fans to believe its existence was an urban legend. Copies of the Japanese edition were eventually sold online for more than $30 ($49.50 in 2025). Foreign Legion was eventually released for free online via digital download by Timbs on February 20, 2005.

"Thinking Cap" was featured in volume 9 of the Japanese pop fanzine Kheer in April 2001, with past label-mate Self. "CITY LIGHTS" received a music video in 2001, distributed by Avex, and was also used as the theme song for the Japanese television show "トップランナー" by the Japanese public broadcaster NHK in April 2001. It was additionally featured as a mashup in a iTunes exclusive extended play by Fantastic Plastic Machine in May 2007.

== Reception ==
Professional ratings
Review scores
Source	Rating
Chicago Tribune	4/5 stars
CDJournal	(positive)

Upon release, the Japanese music magazine CDJournal gave Foreign Legion a positive review, calling it a "masterpiece" of rock and complimenting its power pop performances, claiming people would not get bored listening to the album. CDJapan called Foreign Legion melancholic yet simultaneously beautiful, highlighting the track "The Last Thing" as a standout on the album. HMV stated that the album was worth listening to, but said that "Smitten" and "Encyclopedia Brown" were so incredibly "poppy" it would make one laugh. They complimented the album's variety and compared it to the work of Jellyfish and Ben Folds, claiming the band far surpassed their competition and would soon make a name for themselves.

Writing after the American release of Foreign Legion, David Mesker of the Chicago Tribune noted that Foreign Legion had spent a "lengthy" amount of time as a Japanese import, whilst praising "Poet Tree" as a "bitingly funny rocker", comparing it to the music of Jerry Lee Lewis, and suggesting fans of Ben Folds Five should listen to the album. Jack Silverman of Nashville Scene noted "Poet Tree" as a favorite, appearing in a live set for Fluid Ounces' in 2006.

== Track listing ==
All tracks are written by Seth Timbs, except where noted.

No.	Title	Length
1.	"Show On The Road"	4:30
2.	"Poet Tree"	2:24
3.	"Metaphor"	3:47
4.	"Expect The Worst"	4:14
5.	"Sugar Mama"	4:47
6.	"The Last Thing"	5:18
7.	"Smitten"	3:36
8.	"Encyclopedia Brown"	2:18
9.	"So Far, So Good"	4:32
10.	"Stark Raving Mad"	5:32
Total length:		41:22

Japanese edition
No.	Title	Writer(s)	Length
11.	"She Blinded Me with Science"	Thomas Dolby; Jo Kerr	3:46
12.	"Thinking Cap"		3:06
13.	"Invincible Boy" (Demo)	Timbs; Tomoyuki Tanaka; Sembello	2:42
14.	"CITY LIGHTS" (Home recording with new lyrics)	Timbs; Tanaka	3:13
Total length:			54:43

== Personnel ==
Credits adapted from liner notes.

- Seth Timbs – piano, guitar, vocals
- Brian Rogers – guitar
- Doug Payne – guitar
- Ben Morton – bass
- Jason Dietz – bass
- Trev Wooten – bass, backing vocals
- Sam Baker – drums
- Justin Meyer – drums
- Chuck Pfaff – production, mixing
- Mike Purcell – mastering (1–11)
- Isao Kukuchi – mastering (12–14)
- Haruka Tsukamoto – artwork
- Sumito Tsuda – illustrations
