= Dead Man (Self song) =

2000 song by Self

- Pictogram used in the album for the song

Song by Self

from the album Gizmodgery
- Released: September 5, 2000
- Recorded: 1999–2000
- Studio: Bennett House (Franklin)
- Genre: Alternative rock; power pop; new wave
- Length: 3:03
- Label: Spongebath Records
- Songwriter: Matt Mahaffey
- Producers: Matt Mahaffey; Chris James

Audio
- "Dead Man" on YouTube

"Dead Man" is a song by the American pop rock band Self, released via Spongebath Records on September 5, 2000. It appears as the fourth track of their fourth studio album, Gizmodgery. The song revolves around electronic power pop and alternative rock instrumentation mixed with elements of new wave, lyrically dealing with mortality and existential confusion. Upon release, critics praised "Dead Man" for its sound and songwriting. In the early 2020s, "Dead Man" experienced a resurgence after a video of Tally Hall listening to the track helped it gain new popularity.

== Composition ==
"Dead Man"
An 18-second sample of "Dead Man" by Self, where part of the second verse is heard.

"Dead Man" exclusively uses toy instruments, a technique consistent with its origin album, Gizmodgery (2000). It uses an alternative rock style with a power pop focus, additionally aligning with new wave music. It follows an electronic harpsichord melody with programmed drums, using frequently changing panning on its synthesizers. A keyboard bass copies the drum pattern, while the song's chorus introduces an electric guitar and more drums. The track follows an 8-bar verse–chorus form, additionally incorporating a spoken bridge and an instrumental break. The song's intro stops a note early, resulting in the track containing 91.5 bars. With a tempo of 120 beats per minute and a time signature of 4/4, "Dead Man" has a duration of 3 minutes and 3 seconds. The song is in the key of B major, with some usage of its parallel minor. It lyrically discusses mortality and a failure to understand life, using black comedy as a coping method. Lead member Matt Mahaffey sings this in a mid-to-high range, matching the melodies underneath. The chorus' lyrics are accentuated with more space and sustained notes. The song was recorded using a condenser microphone, with Mahaffey using Pro Tools to equalize the toy instruments' typical mid-range frequencies.

== Release ==
"Dead Man" was released on September 5, 2000, through Spongebath Records. It appears as the fourth track of Gizmodgery, Self's fourth studio album. Very few concerts were performed to promote Gizmodgery's release, limited by the extensive cost of batteries required to power the band's toy instruments. As such, "Dead Man" was usually performed on acoustic instruments after the tour was completed. On March 25, 2015, Self performed the song as part of a Daytrotter session. Prior to their show at WRLT's Ellison Place Street Festival on July 22, 2017, the band published an acoustic performance of the track to YouTube. The song had amassed over 9.7 million streams across Spotify and YouTube by 2025.

== Reception ==
Spencer Owen of Pitchfork compared the song's chorus to the Rentals' soundscape, describing it as a "marvelous slice of power pop". Mark Woodlief of CMJ lauded the track's memorable quirk, while Randy Reiss of Neumu admired its ability to emulate grunge pop with toys. J Noise of Hybrid Magazine likened the keyboard style of "Dead Man" to Greg Hawkes', praising the song's witty lyrics and calling attention to its potential as a radio single. Gerald Dih of AudioPhix complimented the track's full production despite using toy instruments, highlighting its "catchy popcraft" and "clever songwriting" as making the song one of the best of Gizmodgery. In the early 2020s, "Dead Man" became a sleeper hit, with the trend being sparked by a video of rock band Tally Hall listening to the song on the radio. The clip appeared in "South by Southwest 2007", a 2013 bonus episode of Tally Hall's Internet Show. Self was subsequently recommended alongside Tally Hall and Lemon Demon on Spotify by the service's AI algorithms, leading "Dead Man" to rise in popularity.

== Personnel ==
Credits adapted from the album's liner notes.

- Matt Mahaffey – lead vocals, instruments, production, engineer
- Chris James – mixing engineer, production
- Tom Baker – mastering engineer
