= Subaudible tone =

In-band signaling for broadcast radio automation

A subaudible tone is a tone that is used to trigger an automated event at a radio station. A subaudible tone is within the audible frequency range; however, it is usually at a low level that is not noticeable to the average listener at normal volumes. It is a form of in-band signaling.

== Overview ==
These tones are included in the audible main portion of audio in the case of a satellite; on tape, these often are filtered. Typically, subaudible tones are at one of the frequencies: 25, 35, 50, 75 hertz (Hz), or combinations of those frequencies. Until computerized radio automation became inexpensive and common, 25 and 35 Hz were used either in the audio stream or, in the case of tape cartridges used in radio broadcasting (better known as "carts"), on a special track on the tape to indicate to a radio station's automation system that it was time to trigger another event.

With the advent of computers and digital satellites, these tones are relegated to triggering commercial announcements and legal IDs on a dwindling number of radio networks. External data channels have supplanted tones in the audio sent independent of audio on digital satellite feeds for radio. These trigger relay closure terminals on the satellite receiver (Starguide is a prominent system).

== Use for filmstrips ==
Later, filmstrip projectors used subaudible tones to advance to the next frame in a filmstrip presentation. Previously, the phonographic record or audio cassette accompanying a filmstrip to provide its soundtrack would have an audible tone to signal the person operating the projector to advance the film to the next frame. However, automatic filmstrip projectors were introduced in the 1970s (that had an integrated phonograph or cassette player) that would read a subaudible tone of 50 Hz recorded on the soundtrack to trigger the projector to advance to the next frame automatically.

Most cassettes accompanying filmstrips from the 1970s and 80s have one side of the media with audible tones for use with manual projectors and the other side with the same program audio but with 50 Hz subaudible tones instead for automatic projectors. Some filmstrip releases combine audible and subaudible tones, making the filmstrip and its companion cassette or record compatible with any filmstrip projector.
