= Vegetable Kingdom (EP) =

1998 EP by the American power pop band Fluid Ounces

EP by Fluid Ounces
- Released: December 8, 1998
- Recorded: March–April 1998
- Genre: Power pop, college rock
- Label: Spongebath Records
- Producer: Richard Dortch

Fluid Ounces chronology
Big Notebook for Easy Piano (1997)	Vegetable Kingdom (1998)	In the New Old-Fashioned Way (1999)

Vegetable Kingdom is the first and only extended play by the American power pop band Fluid Ounces, released by Spongebath Records on December 8, 1998.

== Reception ==
Vegetable Kingdom received positive reviews from critics, with "Vegetable Kingdom" receiving moderate rotation on the radio station WRLT 100.1. Charlie Zaillian of Nashville Scene compared "Vegetable Kingdom" to the music of the Elephant 6 collective, praising it for being a less “acid-damaged take” than its counterparts. Jamie Kiffel of Lollipop Magazine commended "Stick In The Mud" for “rupturing the disc’s jubilantly jazzy theme with a flannel-rending grunge jag”, likening the song to those of the American alternative rock band Nirvana.

Bryan Tilford of INK19 praised Vegetable Kingdom for being well-crafted, highlighting "Sitting Beside Myself" for combining both jazz and pop and expressing his “salivation” for Fluid Ounces’ then upcoming album, In the New Old-Fashioned Way (1999). Andrew Maligow of Splendid pointed out lead member Seth Timbs’ free-ranged singing and ability to “give you the best song that he and the band can write”, similarly telling readers to listen to Fluid Ounces’ other studio albums.

== Track listing ==
All tracks are written by Seth Timbs.

Vegetable Kingdom track listing
No.	Title	Length
1.	"Vegetable Kingdom"	4:15
2.	"Sitting Beside Myself"	4:43
3.	"Lend Me Your Ears"	2:54
4.	"Stick In The Mud"	4:29
5.	"Sucker"	4:14
Total length:		20:34

== Credits ==
Credits adapted from liner notes.

- Seth Timbs (piano/accordion/vocals/songwriter)
- Brian Rogers (guitar, e-bow, vocals)
- Ben Morton (bass, fiddle)
- Sam Baker (drums)
- Richard Dortch (recording)
- Matt Mahaffey (mixing)
- Eli Shaw (engineer)
- Brian Bottcher (artwork)
