= Useless Keys =

American alternative rock band

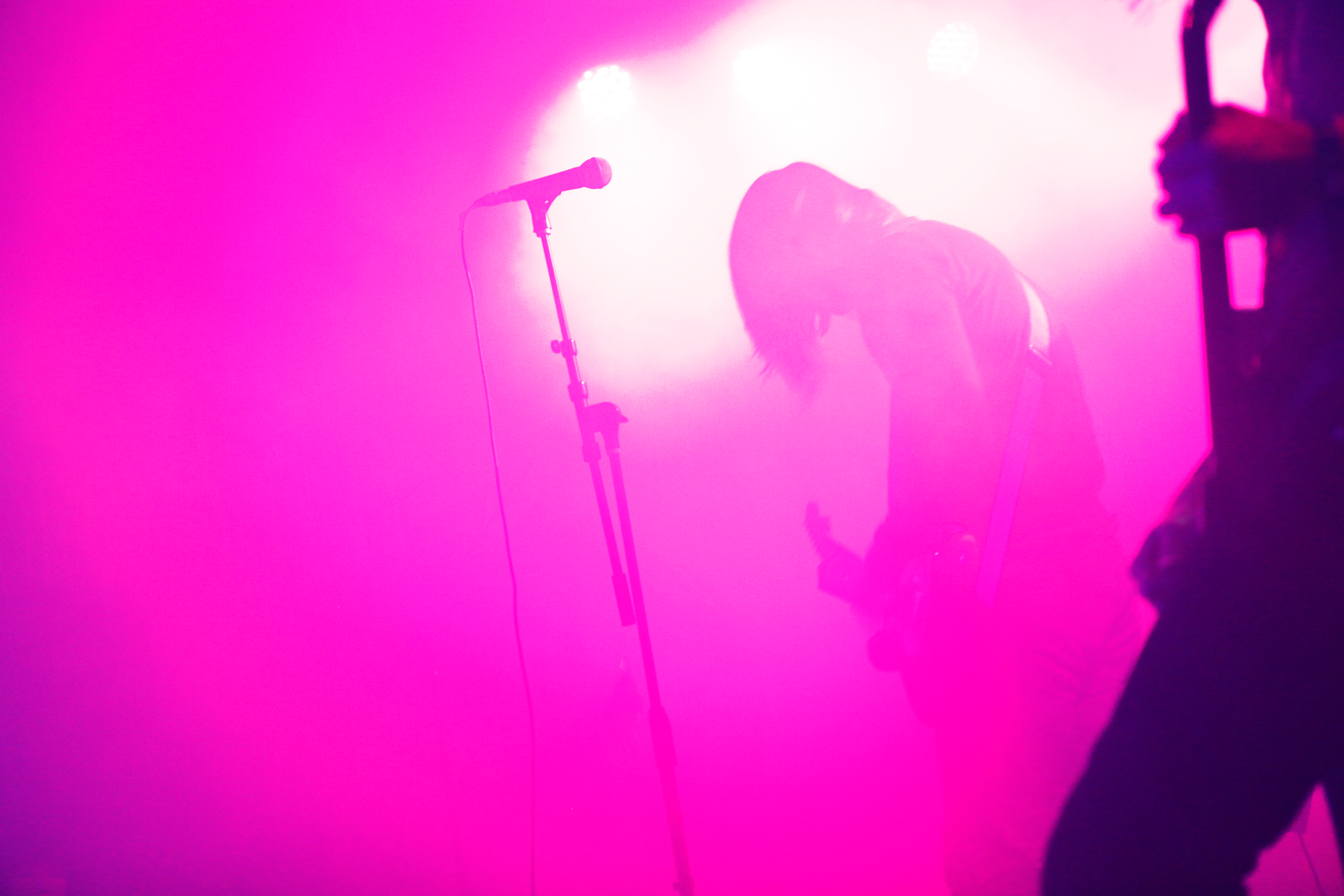
- Useless Keys live at Spaceland on April 26, 2011

Background information
- Origin: Los Angeles, California, U.S.
- Genres: Alternative rock, space rock
- Years active: 2008 – present
- Members: Michael Regilio; Michael Bauer
- Past members: Guylaine Vivarat; Rory Modica; Davin Givhan; Jerry Roe
- Website: Official website

Useless Keys are an American alternative rock band from Los Angeles, California, composed of Michael Regilio (guitar, keyboards) and Michael Bauer (guitar, vocals).

The band formed in May 2008 and their first show was on June 19, 2008 at Spaceland in Silver Lake, California.

== Biography ==
Useless Keys recorded 6 songs at The Carriage House in Silver Lake, California with grammy winning producer Sheldon Gomberg over the winter of 2009. Two songs, "Down Threw" and "White Noise" were mixed by Rick Parker who has also worked with The Von Bondies and Black Rebel Motorcycle Club. "Down Threw" has received strong support from Los Angeles major rock radio station KROQ-FM with multiple spins over the summer of 2009. The recordings have also earned the band praise from various Los Angeles publications including LA Record, LA Weekly, and several popular LA based blogs including Buzzbands, LA Underground, and Radio Free Silverlake.

"White Noise" is featured on Dead Bees records' Label Sampler No. 8 which was released on May 28, 2009 at Barcelona's Primavera Sound Festival. Dead Bees has also released music from popular bands such as Brian Jonestown Massacre and Blitzen Trapper.

"White Noise" and "Down Threw" were featured on the nationwide syndicated "Undiscovered Radio Network" show that airs on KBRE in Merced, California; WHBR in Parkersburg, West Virginia; WAMX in Huntington/Ashland, West Virginia; WAQX in Syracuse, New York;and WTFX in Louisville, Kentucky. They have been featured on the show several times in 2009.

Useless Keys' debut EP was released in January 2010 and is entitled Is the Painting Changing.

Useless Keys travelled to New York in September 2009 to play 3 shows in NYC/Brooklyn including one date opening for The Rifles at Mercury Lounge.

The band played a four-show Monday night residency at The Echo in Los Angeles in February 2010.

Useless Keys' single, "White Noise", charted nationally on Alternative Specialty Radio in 2010 with heavy support from KROQ 106.7 FM in Los Angeles and strong support from KNDD 107.7 The End in Seattle, KROX-FM in Austin, KINB in Oklahoma City, KFMA in Tucson, KBZT 94.9 FM in San Diego, and several other major markets.

The band spent 2010 and 2011 touring up and down the West Coast and Southwest with multiple dates in Seattle, Portland, San Diego and Phoenix while playing numerous shows in their hometown of Los Angeles. Useless Keys has played shows with Warpaint, Band of Skulls, The Rifles, Free Energy, Light Pollution, Crystal Antlers, and And You Will Know Us By the Trail of Dead. Useless Keys opened for A Place to Bury Strangers in late June and played a two night stand with Dax Riggs at Spaceland in early September.

Currently, Useless Keys are writing material for their debut album and will begin recording by the end of the year.

== Discography ==
=== Album/EPs/Singles ===
Is the Painting Changing EP (January 19, 2010) Label: Planned Obsolescence Records (self released)

=== Compilations ===
White Noise Dead Bees Label Sampler No. 8 CD (May 28, 2009) Label: Dead Bees records
