= Breakfast with Girls =

Studio album by Self
- Released: July 13, 1999
- Recorded: September 1997–September 1998; December 1998–January 1999 ("Suzie Q Sailaway" and "Uno Song")
- Studios: Bennett House (Franklin); Ocean Way (Nashville); Matt's House (Murfreesboro); Treasure Isle (Nashville)
- Genres: Power pop; glossy pop; hip-hop
- Length: 48:22
- Labels: DreamWorks; Spongebath
- Producers: Matt Mahaffey; Ken Andrews

Self chronology
| Feels Like Breakin' Shit (1998) | Breakfast with Girls (1999) | Brunch (1999) |

Alternate cover
- Extended cover art

Singles from Breakfast with Girls
- 1. "Paint by Numbers" Released: July 21, 1998; 2. "Meg Ryan" Released: May 25, 1999; 3. "Suzie Q Sailaway" Released: December 11, 1999

Breakfast with Girls (Japanese: ブレックファスト・ウィズ・ガールズ, Hepburn: Burekkufasuto uizu gāruzu) is the third studio album by the American pop rock band Self, released on July 13, 1999, by DreamWorks Records and Spongebath Records, and is the band's only album released on DreamWorks. Its songs were mainly written and composed by Matt Mahaffey, the band's frontman. The album includes elements of a power pop and hip-hop soundscape. Three singles supported it; the first, "Paint by Numbers", received a nomination for Song of the Year from the Nashville Music Association Awards, while the second, "Meg Ryan", was the album's major single.

It peaked at number eighteen on the CMJ Top 200 chart, the band's best-known performance at the time, later beaten by their fourth studio album Gizmodgery (2000).

== Background ==
For his debut album, Subliminal Plastic Motives (1995), Self's frontman Matt Mahaffey focused on guitar arrangements and incorporating rock music. Following its release, he frequently appeared at rock radio stations, performed at venues within the genre, and received invitations to strip clubs from radio personalities and other music industry colleagues. Mahaffey's strong disinterest in this lifestyle led him to drop his guitar usage on his second album, The Half-Baked Serenade (1997), citing the first album as a bad first impression. He continued to hold the mindset when making his third album, declaring the project to be "anti-rock".

After Mahaffey had completed The Half-Baked Serenade, he opened auditions for a horn section in the band, settling on Mac Burrus as a bassist instead. Burrus officially joined the band in October 1997. Before recording began for Self's third studio album, Mahaffey attended a Failure show in Nashville. Through a mutual friend, Mahaffey met with Failure's frontman, Ken Andrews, proceeding to play a concert with Failure as a part of Self at the Exit/In some time later.

== Production ==
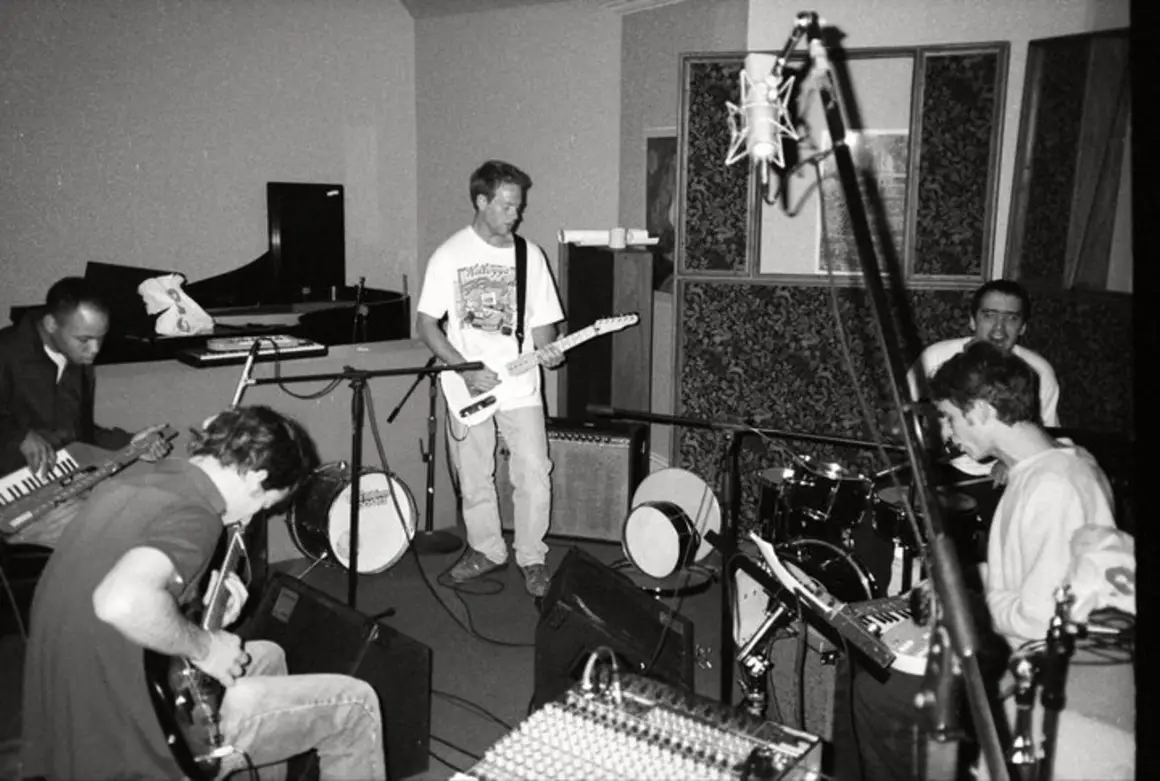
Self during the recording of Breakfast with Girls in 1998.

After signing to DreamWorks Records, a larger budget allowed Mahaffey to work with various acclaimed engineers and producers for the album, including Andrews, Richard Dodd, and Hugh Padgham. He additionally recorded with a full orchestra for some songs, led by the Nashville String Machine. Sessions primarily took place at Ocean Way in Nashville, Tennessee, with additional recording done at the Bennett House in Franklin, Tennessee, Mahaffey's home in Murfreesboro, Tennessee, and Treasure Isle in Nashville. Mahaffey composed each song's instrumental before writing lyrics, prioritizing a wide range of expression.

Mahaffey spent his weekdays working on Breakfast with Girls while allotting weekends to work on Gizmodgery (2000), which is dubbed as "a toy instrument album" due to being recorded completely with toys. Mahaffey occasionally sent songs recorded during these sessions to DreamWorks, with them becoming interested in one and asking him to re-record it for inclusion on Breakfast with Girls, he subsequently re-recorded the song with a full band, wishing to contain toy songs to Gizmodgery. This process delayed the release of Breakfast with Girls, which, combined with the track's shift in style, led to a retroactive dissatisfaction. Despite having Self under contract, DreamWorks decided against releasing Gizmodgery under the label. The song "Uno Song" was Mahaffey's first project in Pro Tools, and thus the album's only non-analog song. The track's files were lost during production, leading the song's final version to be a rough mix. The label chose "Meg Ryan" as a single, a love song centered around the actress of the same name. Overall, Self spent two years creating Breakfast with Girls.

=== Brunch ===
The stylized text of the Brunch B-side EP.

Mahaffey originally wrote and produced eighteen songs for Breakfast with Girls, but he told that DreamWorks Records "chopped" five songs, which then appear as bonus tracks on vinyl copies of the album, while some of these were picked to appear on Brunch, the band's first EP. It was released two months later in September 1999, through DreamWorks Records and Spongebath Records, and given to fans who pre-ordered Breakfast with Girls as consolation for its multiple delays.

== Music and lyrics ==
=== Style and influences ===
Breakfast with Girls primarily uses a pop rock and hip hop soundscape, with elements of rhythm and blues, mainly taking influence from late 1980's hip-hop, and the American musician Prince. Mahaffey stated he didn't know a "genre" to define Breakfast with Girls with, and that he hoped the press would come up with an "interesting name" for it, with Breakfast with Girls subsequently being compared most commonly to the work of Beck. Mahaffey later described Breakfast with Girls as "disturbed" like a "constant battle between good & evil."

Breakfast with Girls begins with the song "The End of It All", heavily consisting of a sharp piano and "crunchy" guitars, additionally featuring a hip-hop inspired beat. "Kill the Barflies" is primarily a rock song, with Mahaffey's vocals heavily distorted until they are ineligible. "Meg Ryan" is sung in "white-boy" whiny vocals, and heavily samples the New Kids on The Block album Hangin' Tough (1988) into its beat. The rhythm of "Meg Ryan" is interrupted by Mahaffey playing a piano amidst the song's chorus. "Uno Song" features a Casio synthesizer, and a harpsichord, similar to that of The Monkees, and the music of the 1960s. "Paint by Numbers" follows the power pop styling of Breakfast with Girls, as well as incorporating a surf rock aesthetic. It features an organ, and is mixed with a synthesizer and punchy drums.

=== Lyrics ===
Self based Breakfast with Girls on a novel. "Suzie Q Sailaway" was originally written and recorded by Mahaffey for inclusion on Gizmodgery, but he was requested by DreamWorks to release it on Breakfast with Girls. Late in development, DreamWorks executives told Mahaffey that the album did not have any viable singles. In retaliation, he wrote "Uno Song" in two days as the "prettiest pop song" possible. Named after the card game Uno, it was intended to appeal to the band's female audience and become a hit single. "Paint by Numbers" is a meta song written about songwriting, with Mahaffey penning the track after seeing Smash Mouth's success with their debut single, "Walkin' on the Sun," mixed with anti-mainstream lyricism. "Fliptop Box" consists solely of indirect references to smoking. Mahaffey struggled with a cigarette addiction at the time, so he wrote the song in a failed attempt to quit.

== Marketing ==
Marketing for Breakfast with Girls was handled by DreamWorks, who later launched a website for the band in promotion of Breakfast with Girls, advertised to feature new MP3 files daily. The interactive flash website was available on DreamWorks' main website, alongside a playable flash game, in it, players would have to defeat Self's members to gain access to different sections of the website. Upon completion, players would gain access to a free MP3 download of Feels Like Breakin' Shit (1998). DreamWorks additionally sent VHS tapes to the press, which showcased and detailed the bands activities during the creation of Breakfast with Girls.

Upon its release, DreamWorks advertised Breakfast with Girls as "a mix of - um, everything". A demo of "It All Comes Out in the Wash" appeared in volumes one and two of Soaking in the Center of the Universe, sampler albums released by Spongebath Records in January 1998 and March 1998, respectively. The second volume additionally featured a demo of "Placing the Blame". The lead single of Breakfast was Girls was "Paint by Numbers", which was included on the soundtrack of the film Dead Man on Campus (1998). It released through MTV and DreamWorks Records on July 21, 1998. Director Alan Cohn picked the song as a theme for the main character, Josh Miller (Tom Everett Scott). "Meg Ryan" was released as the album's third and final single on May 25, 1999, marketed as the album's main single. Self appeared live for LAUNCH magazine in January 2001, performing the song "Uno Song" for LAUNCH's "The Lot."

== Release ==
Breakfast with Girls was delayed multiple times, first reported by CMJ to have a release date of August 25, 1998. In later issues, the magazine projected release dates of March 2, June 29, and July 14, 1999. The album eventually released on July 13, 1999, published through DreamWorks and Spongebath. It is the only studio album Self released through the former. Breakfast with Girls was distributed on CD, cassette, and vinyl. The latter was delayed in production due to a lack of commercial demand. In a 2014 interview with the Alternative Press, Mahaffey stated he was unsure who published the album on streaming services.

=== Artwork ===
The cover artwork of Breakfast with Girls shows Mahaffey and a woman walking together, largely obscured by the band's logo on a black background. Physical copies feature numerous more photos, each focusing on different band members. This design was conceived by Brian Bottcher, who previously did artwork for Subliminal Plastic Motives. He was inspired by the 1968 film The Party and its promotional cardboard lobby cards to make Breakfast with Girls' artwork resemble a film poster.

== Reception ==
Professional ratings
Review scores
| Source | Rating |
|---|---|
| AllMusic | 2.5/5 stars |
| Pitchfork | 6.5/10 |
| Spin | 7/10 |

Gabe Besecker of Woof Magazine stated that the rock focus of Subliminal Plastic Motives led Breakfast with Girls to initially receive a negative reception for its power pop style, but that it is regarded as "a masterpiece" by fans. Barry Walters of Spin reviewed Breakfast with Girls with a 7 out of 10 rating, complimenting Mahaffey's creativity and style fusions alongside the project's emotional vulnerability and quirkiness. Carlene Bauer of CMJ also praised the album's glossy, hook-driven pop, appreciating its fun instrumentation and mix of heartfelt and ironic lyricism.

Vincent Jeffries of AllMusic gave Breakfast with Girls 2.5 stars out of 5, criticizing its overly intricate presentation and lack of melodic appeal while commending its diverse musical styles and experimental composition. Nick Mirov of Pitchfork rated the album a 6.5 out of 10, highlighting Mahaffey's ambitious production and clever songwriting but stating that it often suffers from overcrowded ideas and mismatched elements. At the 1999 Nashville Music Association Awards, "Paint by Numbers" was nominated for Song of the Year, but lost to Faith Hill's "This Kiss".

== Track listing ==
All tracks are written by Matt Mahaffey, except where noted.

Breakfast with Girls track listing
| No. | Title | Writer(s) | Length |
|---|---|---|---|
| 1. | "The End of it All" | | 4:48 |
| 2. | "Kill the Barflies" | | 4:16 |
| 3. | "Meg Ryan" | | 3:59 |
| 4. | "Suzie Q Sailaway" | Matt Mahaffey; Mike Mahaffey; Mac Burrus; Chris James; Jason Rawlings | 2:25 |
| 5. | "Uno Song" | | 2:56 |
| 6. | "Paint by Numbers" | | 3:07 |
| 7. | "What Are You Thinking?" | Mahaffey; James Robbins; Ella Fitzgerald; Buck Ram; Chick Webb | 4:53 |
| 8. | "Sucker" | | 4:18 |
| 9. | "Breakfast with Girls" | Mahaffey; Hank Shocklee; Keith Shocklee; Eric Sadler; J.T. Smith | 3:12 |
| 10. | "Better Than Aliens" | | 1:53 |
| 11. | "It All Comes Out in the Wash" | Mahaffey; Chester Burnett | 4:00 |
| 12. | "Callgirls" | | 3:29 |
| 13. | "Placing the Blame" | | 5:00 |
| Total length: | | | 48:22 |

Vinyl edition
| No. | Title | Length |
|---|---|---|
| 14. | "Fliptop Box" | 3:45 |
| 15. | "You're a Drug" | 3:22 |
| 16. | "Happy Accidents" | 4:09 |
| 17. | "Rusted and Used" | 4:24 |
| 18. | "Crashing Parties" | 4:22 |
| Total length: | | 68:24 |

Sample credits

- "Kill the Barflies" contains samples of "T-Boz Tried to Talk to Me!", written by Dwight Conroy Farrell, as performed by Count Bass D.
- "Meg Ryan" contains samples of "Alphabet St.", written by Prince Rogers, as performed by Prince.
- "What Are You Thinking?" embodies portions of "Chew, Chew, Chew, Chew Your Bubble Gum", written by Ella Fitzgerald, Buck Ram, and Chick Webb, as performed by Ella Fitzgerald.
- "Sucker" contains samples of "Exactly Like You", written by Beverly Laine, as performed by Beverly Laine, and samples of "Day by Day", written by Sammy Cahn, as performed by Bing Crosby with Mel Tormé and His Mel-Tones.
- "Breakfast with Girls" contains samples of "It Gets No Rougher", written by Hank Shocklee, Keith Shocklee, Eric Sadler, and J.T. Smith, as performed by LL Cool J.
- "It All Comes Out in the Wash" contains samples of "Moanin' at Midnight", written by Chester Burnett, as performed by Howlin' Wolf.

== Personnel ==
Self

- Matt Mahaffey – lead vocals, instruments
- Mike Mahaffey – electric guitar, acoustic guitar (all tracks), bass (6, 12, 13), xylophone, clarinet samples (8)
- Mac Burrus – bass (all tracks), toilet (1), harmonica (2), double bass (9), trombone (11)
- Chris James – piano (1, 4, 6, 7), B-3, vox (2, 6), toy piano, xylophone (4)
- Jason Rawlings – drums (4, 7, 11), percussion (6, 12)

Additional musicians and arrangement

- Nashville String Machine – strings (7, 13)
- Richard Griffith – saxophone (9)
- David Jellema – horns (11)
- Chuck Lee – string arrangement (7)
- Ron Huff – conductor (7)
- Chris McDonald – string arrangement, conductor (13)

Technical

- Matt Mahaffey – production, engineer (all tracks), mixing engineer (5)
- Hugh Padgham – mixing engineer (1–3, 6–13)
- Csaba Petocz – mixing engineer (4)
- Bob Ludwig – mastering engineer
- Richard Williams – executive producer
- Richard Dodd – engineer
- Bobby Dufresne Jr. – engineer
- Jeff Balding – engineer
- Ken Andrews – engineer (all tracks), production (13)
- Shawn McLean – engineer (all tracks), string engineer (13)
- Joe Baldridge – engineer
- Chris James – engineer
- Glenn Spinner – assistant engineer
- Aaron Swihart – assistant engineer
- Joe Costa – assistant engineer
- Brian Garten – assistant engineer
- John Saylor – assistant engineer
- Allen Sides – string engineer (7)

Other

- Michael Ostin – artists and repertoire
- Brian Bottcher – art direction and design, photography
- Brooke Niessner – art and photo assistance
- Kathy Morgan – photography
- Doug Payne – photo assistance
- Zumwalt, Almon & Hayes – legal

== Charts ==
=== Weekly charts ===
Weekly chart performance
| Chart (1999) | Peak position |
|---|---|
| Alternative Radio Airplay (CMJ) | 19 |
| CMJ Top 200 | 18 |

=== Year-end charts ===
1999 year-end charts
| Chart (1999) | Position |
|---|---|
| CMJ Top 200 | 102 |
