= Filmstrip =

Film roll with a series of still images

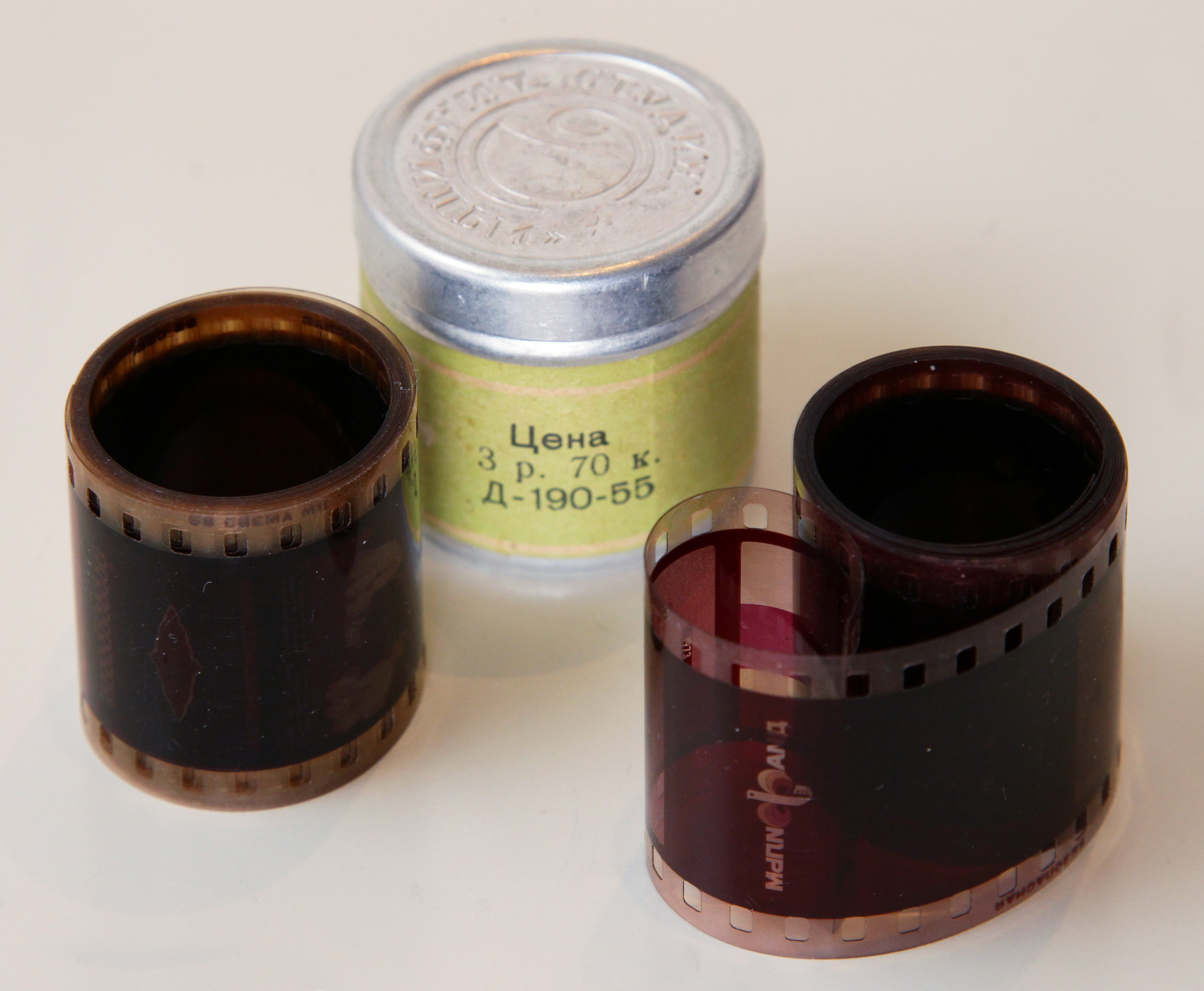
Diafilm strip

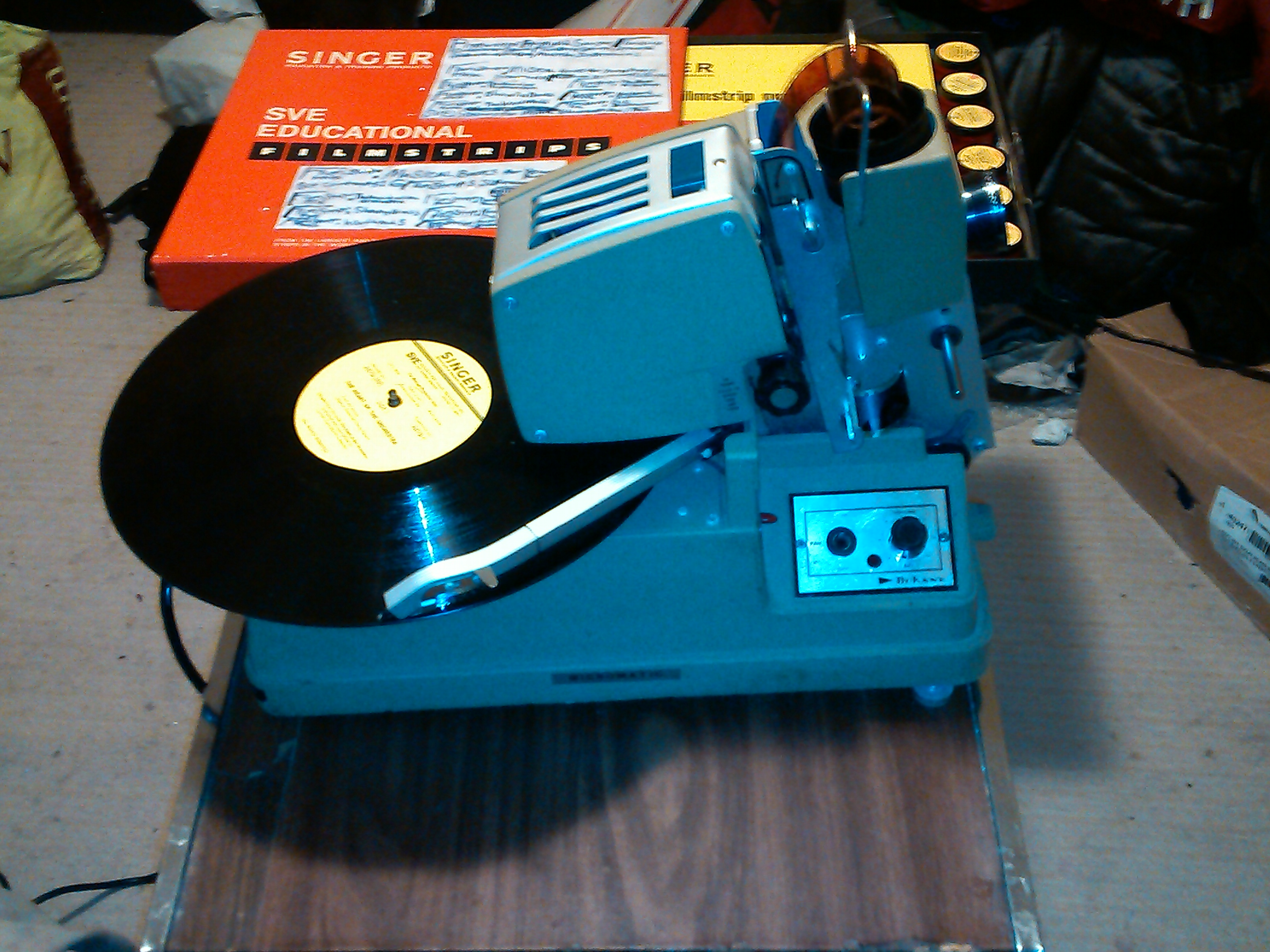
Dukane Record Automatic Filmstrip Projector

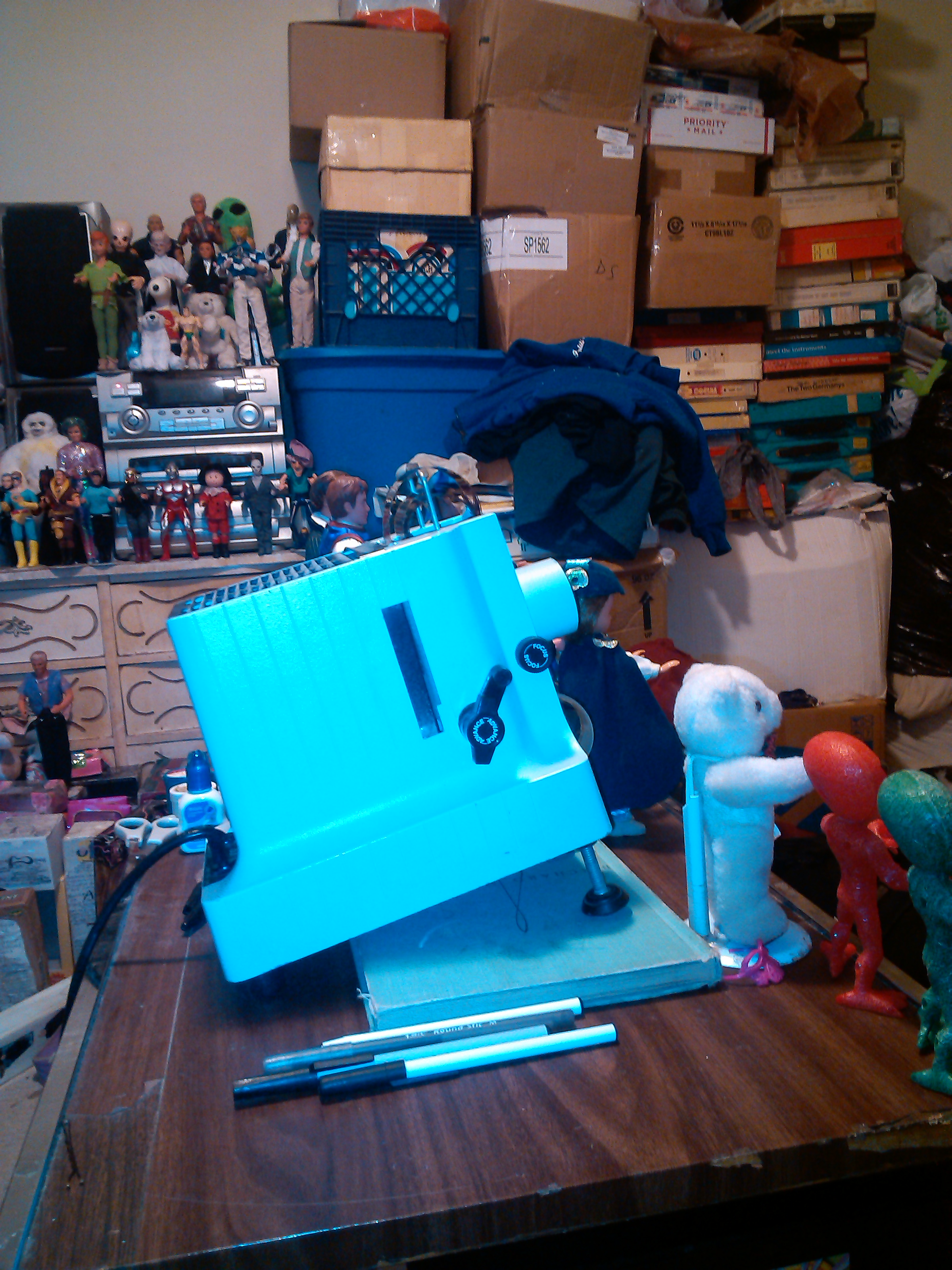
Dukane Silent filmstrip projector

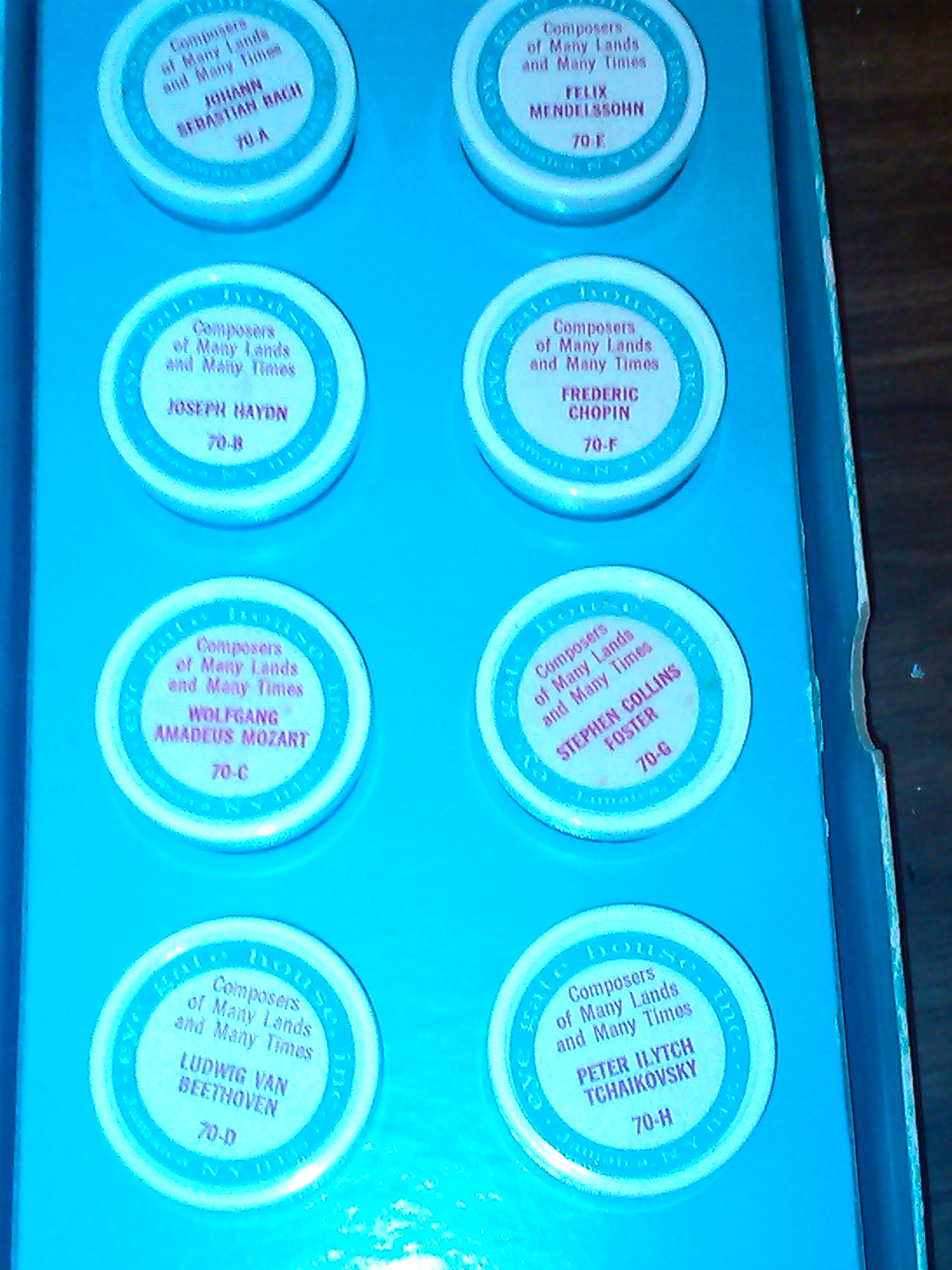
Music captioned filmstrip set, titled "Composers of many lands and many times by Eye Gate House Inc 1954"

The filmstrip is a form of still image instructional media, once widely used by educators in primary and secondary schools (K–12) and for corporate presentations (e.g., sales training and new product introductions). It was largely made obsolete by the late 1980s by newer and increasingly lower-cost full-motion videocassettes and later on by DVDs. From the 1920s to the 1980s, filmstrips provided an easy and less expensive alternative to full motion educational films, requiring little storage space and being very quick to rewind for the next use. Filmstrips were durable and rarely needed splicing. They are still used in some areas.

== Technology ==
A filmstrip is a spool of 35 mm positive film containing a series of images (often thirty-two to sixty-four) in sequential order. Filmstrips could be inserted either vertically or horizontally, depending on the manufacturer, in front of the projector aperture. With vertically oriented strips, the frame size is roughly the same as a 35mm movie film projector. Horizontally oriented strips are roughly the same size as a 35mm still camera. Two frames of a vertical filmstrip take up roughly the same amount of space as a single frame on the horizontal. Many projectors were equipped to show both formats.

Early celluloid filmstrips were susceptible to combusting like all nitrate-based film. Furthermore, unlike conventional film stock, individual frames of this kind of film allow projecting for a relatively extended period of time without being damaged by the projector's light source.

Filmstrips (which often came with an instructor's guide) could be used for either self-paced learning or group presentations. They could be projected onto a wall or conventional screen, or displayed by personal viewing units that contained mirrors and lower-wattage lamps for up-close viewing by one or two people.

Filmstrips could be captioned with text, accompanied by a script, or accompanied by a record or tape recording containing narration and, often, musical segments or sound effects. Recordings would contain tones to signal the projectionist to advance the filmstrip to the next frame. Later technical improvements allowed higher-end projectors to advance the film automatically through the use of inaudible recorded tones.

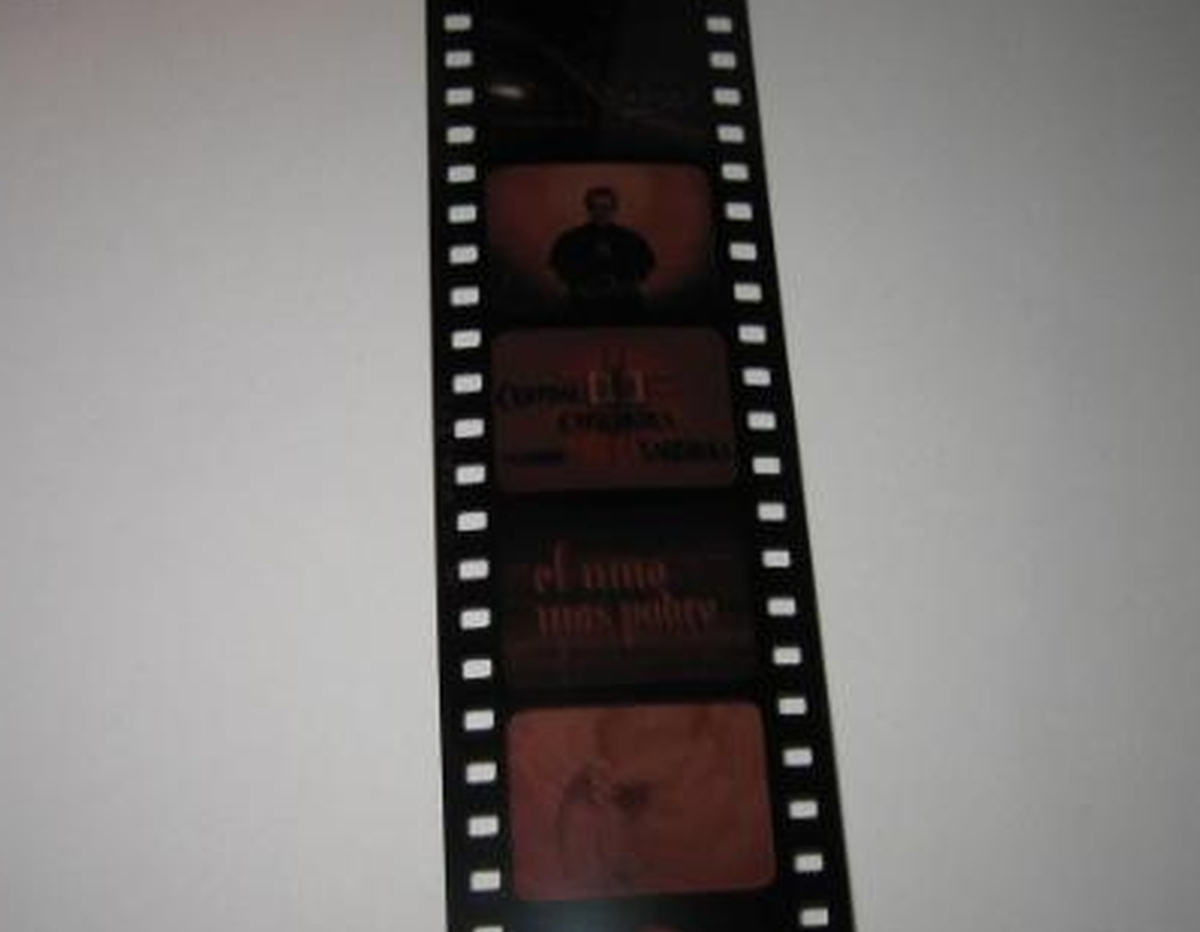
Filmstrip

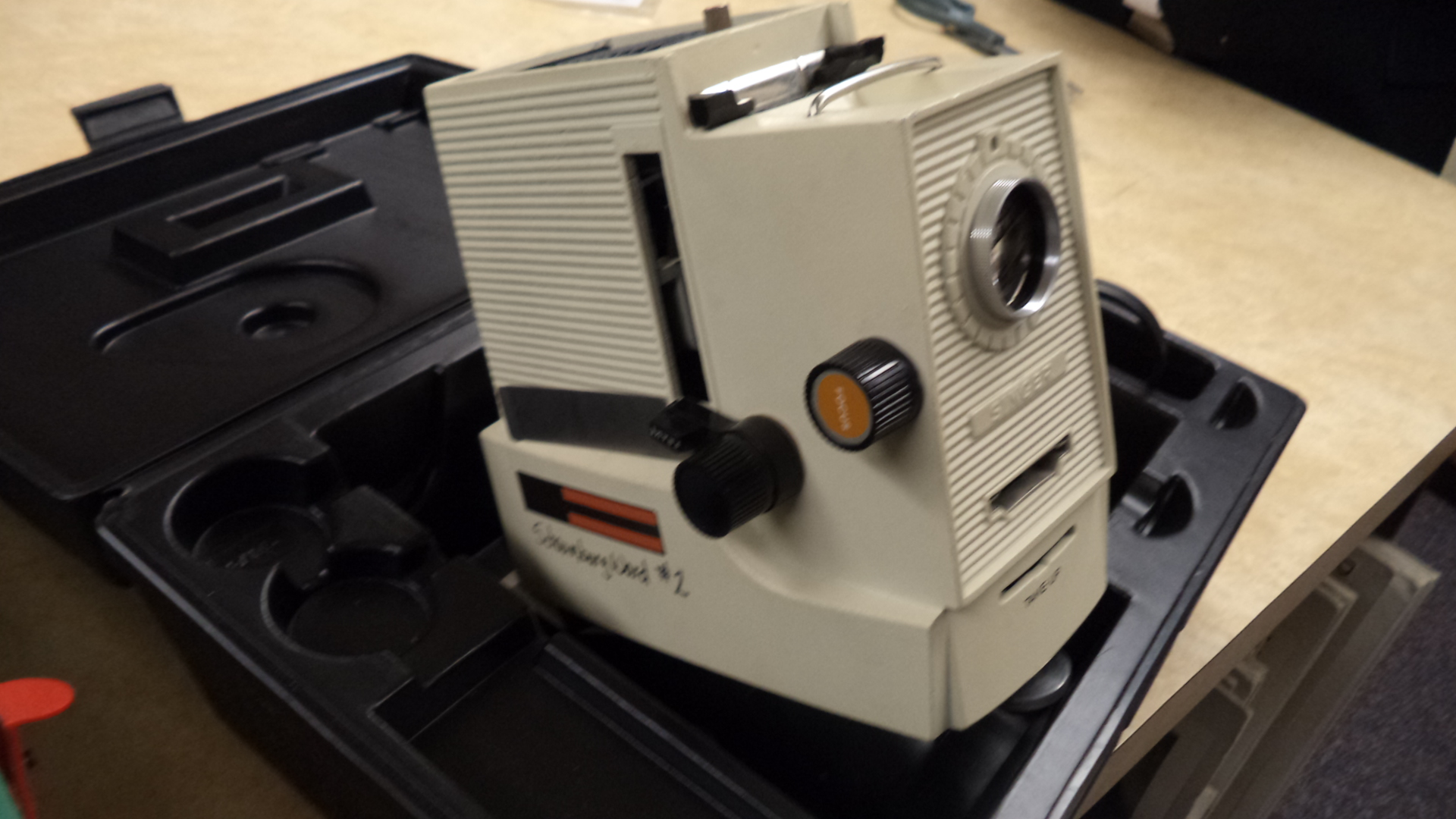
A film strip projector.

== Film production ==
By the later part of the 1960s, firms such as Warren Schloat Productions, CBS, The New York Times Company, Scott Education, Coronet Films, Sunburst Media, and Guidance Associates were producing titles featuring photographs by famous artists and of notable events with a synchronized audio track. The music and narration for the filmstrip originally came on a vinyl record.

There were filmstrips produced in many different subject areas including music, art, language arts, math, business and home economics. Filmstrips in the science, career, vocational and technical subject areas were produced by such firms as Bergwall Productions and Prentice Hall Media (formerly Warren Schloat Productions).

=== Home entertainment ===
In the early 1950s production companies started producing filmstrips for home entertainment. There were a number of filmstrips from Disney and the Society for Visual Education Inc.(Chicago), among other.

=== Eastern Europe production ===
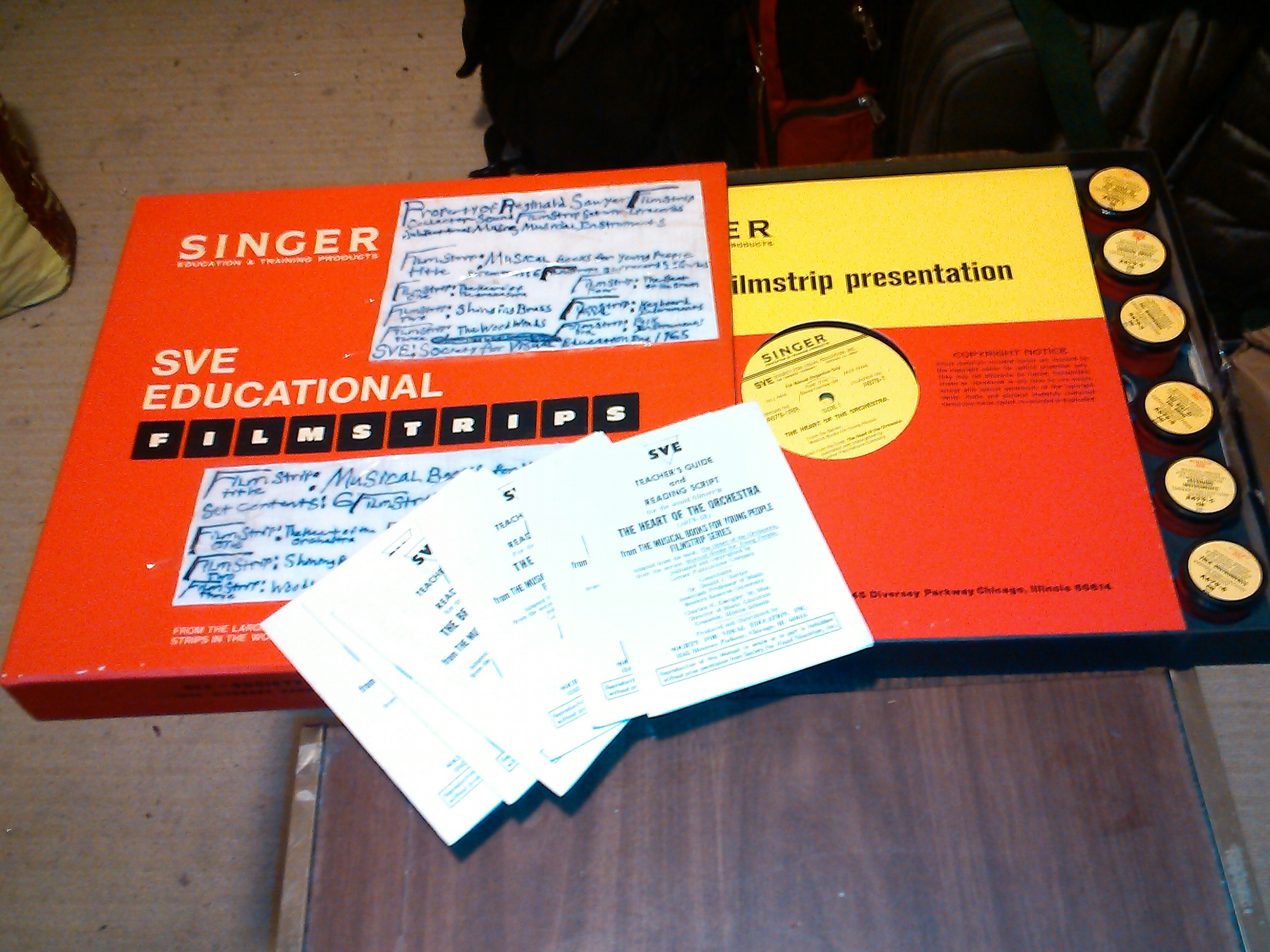
An SVE music filmstrip set; filmstrip title: "Musical Books for young people"

Film strips were popular in the USSR because movie projectors and VCRs were not in common use until the early 1990s. A great number of films were produced by the "Diafilm" studio. The majority of these films did not have supplementary audio, but were instead captioned. Many filmstrips were produced by "cinematographic studios" in former Soviet bloc countries such as Poland and Hungary during the 1950s and 1960s.

In Greece they were known and sold by the name "tainies Argo Film" (Argo Film movies) from the name of the company (Argo Film) that translated the scripts into Greek and organized the productions' distribution in Greece. The titles included children's stories, fairy tales, Greek history, Christianity, adventure, science fiction and war stories.

== Automatic film advance ==
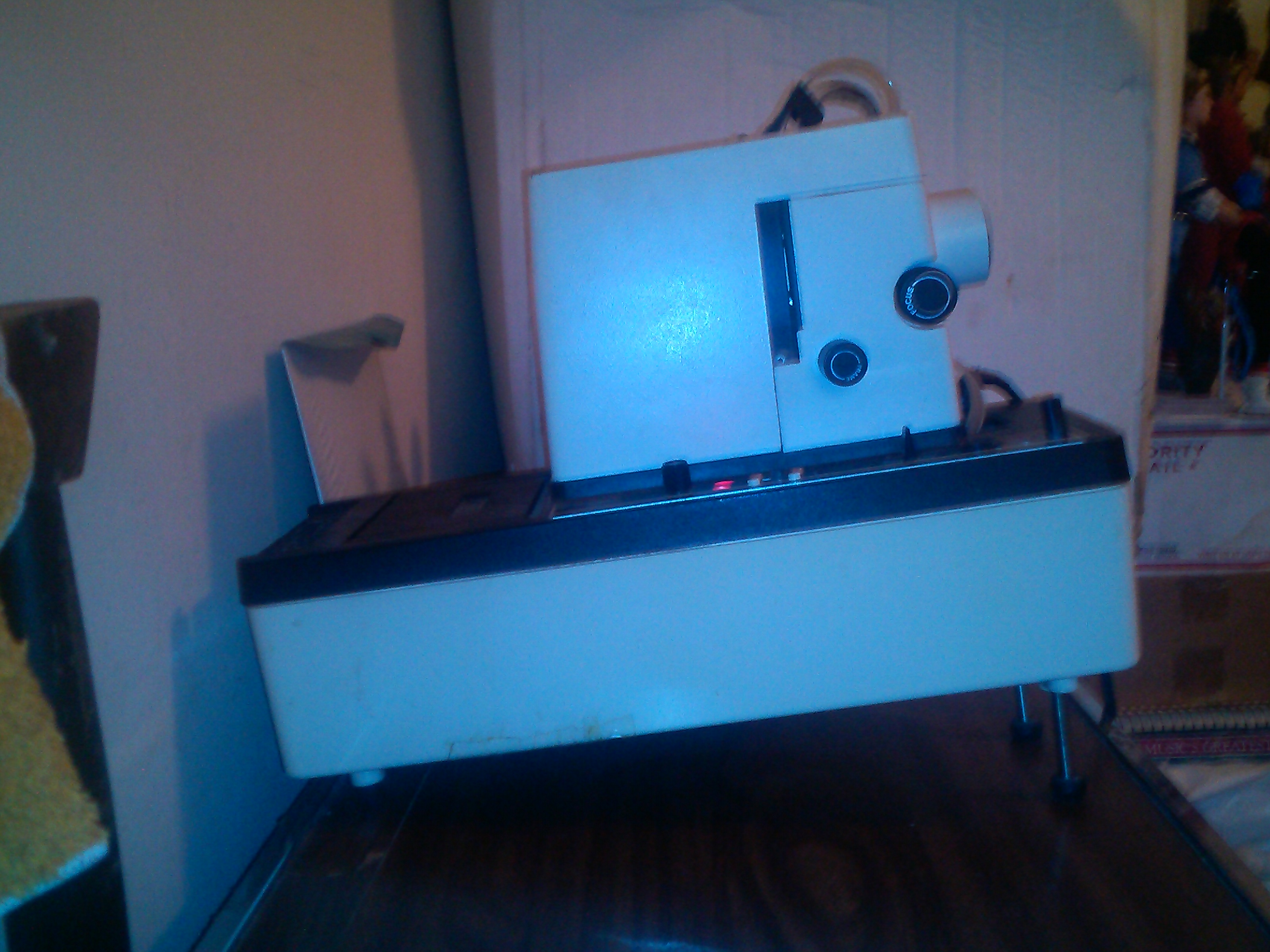
Dukane Micromatic II, Cassette Automatic Filmstrip Projector

During the 1970s, projectors became available with built-in phonographs or cassette players that could automatically advance the film by means of a 50 Hz subaudible tone recorded on the accompanying record or cassette, which would signal the projector to advance the frame. Most cassettes accompanying filmstrips in the 1970s and 1980s would have the same audio material on both sides of the tape. One side would have audible tones for the fully manual projectors, and the other side would have the subaudible tones for automatic projectors, while some had both audible and subaudible tones combined.

In 1979–1980 the DuKane Corporation in St. Charles, Illinois began to produce a cassette automatic filmstrip projector called the DuKane Micromatic II. The La Belle Commpak system used a 1000 Hz tone on 8-track tape to advance to the next slide. The General Electric Show'N Tell record system used 16mm for film, and a phonograph record for audio (though the Show'N Tell would advance the film at a fixed rate through a gear).

== Decline and obsolescence ==
The 1980s brought the advent of the video cassette recorder (VCR), which became increasingly affordable. When VCRs came within reach for most schools' budgets, filmstrip use declined. Videotape instruction combined the ease of the filmstrip with automatically synchronized audio and full motion video. By the early 1990s, the vast majority of filmstrip producers that were not equipped to compete with video either closed or sold their businesses.

In the late 1990s to early 2000s, some audiovisual companies (such as Society for Visual Education Inc., Educational Audio Visual, and Metro Audio Visual) were still producing filmstrips for schools and libraries. When VHS, DVD, multimedia projectors and computers became popular in schools and libraries, however, filmstrips ceased to be used in schools, and many public libraries no longer had filmstrips in their catalogs. By the mid-2000s many schools no longer purchased filmstrips, and audiovisual companies stopped producing them.

== See also ==
- Reversal film
- Show'N Tell
- Slide copier
- Slideshow
- ViewMaster
