= Big Notebook for Easy Piano =

Studio album by Fluid Ounces
- Released: June 3, 1997
- Recorded: 1995–1996
- Studio: Alex The Great (Berry Hill, Tennessee)
- Genres: Power pop; college rock
- Label: Spongebath Records
- Producer: Ross Rice

Fluid Ounces chronology
Big Notebook for Easy Piano (1997)	Vegetable Kingdom (1998)

Big Notebook for Easy Piano is the debut studio album by the American power pop band Fluid Ounces, released by Spongebath Records on June 3, 1997.

== Reception ==
Professional ratings
Review scores
Source	Rating
The Tennessean	3/5 stars

Big Notebook for Easy Piano received generally positive reviews. Nashville Scene called the album "one of the year's brightest pop records—an explosion of striking hooks and barbed wordplay, set off by a bouncy piano-based sound that veers from vaudeville to lush balladry."

== Accolades ==
At the 1998 Nashville Music Awards, Fluid Ounces received a nomination for the Rock Album of the Year and the Best Album Artwork categories for Big Notebook for Easy Piano.

Nominations for "Big Notebook for Easy Piano"
Year	Organization	Award	Result
1998	Nashville Music Awards	Rock Album of the Year	Nominated
1998	Nashville Music Awards	Best Album Artwork	Nominated

== Track listing ==
All tracks are written by Seth Timbs.

Big Notebook for Easy Piano track listing
No.	Title	Length
1.	"Shamrock"	3:28
2.	"Tricky Fingers"	3:34
3.	"Birdbrained"	3:49
4.	"Liquorish Vampires"	3:41
5.	"Daddy Scruff"	5:42
6.	"Record Stack"	3:32
7.	"Role Call"	4:03
8.	"Spill Your Brains"	3:10
9.	"Milk Moustache"	3:27
10.	"Kept Alive By Science"	4:10
11.	"Big Empty"	3:07
12.	"Poor Man"	4:10
23.	"Killjoy" (Hidden track)	5:07
Total length:		53:18

=== Notes ===
- "Killjoy" begins after 11 tracks of seven-second silence.

== Credits ==
Credits adapted from liner notes.

- Seth Timbs (piano/guitar/vocals/songwriter)
- Brian Rogers (guitar, vocals)
- Ben Morton (bass)
- Sam Baker (drums)
- Richard Dortch (mixing, mastering)
- Eli Shaw (engineering, mixing)
- Kathy Morgan (photography)
- Brian Bottcher (artwork, photography)
