= Show'N Tell =

Record-playing toy

Show 'N Tell
- Other names: Show 'n Tell Phono-Viewer
- Type: Slide projector
- Invented by: General Electric
- Company: General Electric; CBS Toys
- Country: United States
- Features: Record player Slide projector

The Show 'N Tell is a toy combination record player and filmstrip viewer manufactured by General Electric from October 1964 to the 1970s at GE's Utica, NY facility.

It resembles a television set, but has a record player on the top. Records and slides were sold for it in combination (known as Picturesound programs). The slide strips, a flat plastic key 11 inches long containing a strip of 16mm color film, are inserted into the top of the device. As the record played (typically telling a story), the slide strip, through which the images were projected on the screen, automatically advanced to illustrate it. The mechanism by which the slide advanced is purely mechanical, and is based on the rotation of the turntable, so proper operation requires manually spinning it a few revolutions before beginning the presentation. The original selling price of the unit was $29.95 and Picturesound programs sold for 99 cents with "a library of five programs" selling for $4.95.

Thirty-five programs were grouped in seven "libraries" initially:

- Fairy Tales and Cartoons
- Children's Favorite Classics I
- Children's Favorite Classics II
- History
- Science and Space
- The World We Live In
- Steps to Knowledge

Licensed film strip and record packages were produced for many different children's properties, including Disney and Sesame Street. An advertisement in LIFE Magazine also specifically mentions Pinocchio, Peter Pan, and the Wizard of Oz "as well as educational programs created by World Book Encyclopedia." By 1965, there were 140 programs available. Each program moved through 15 color slides and ran approximately 4 minutes.

It also functioned as a standard record player, able to play 16, 33⅓, 45, and 78 RPM records through its built-in speaker.

General Electric released a "compact" version (Model A605) of the Show 'N Tell in 1966 for $19.95.

The Show 'n Tell was also sold as the Show 'n Tell Phono-Viewer by CBS Toys, in the early 1980s, under the brand name "Child Guidance." These devices, which were drastically redesigned from their earlier version, only had two speeds (33⅓ and 45), and could not play full 12" LPs. However, the Phono-Viewer could optionally move the projected image off the built-in screen and onto an outside surface (such as a wall or screen).
