= Fluid Ounces (band) =

American musical group (1994–2008)

Background information
- Origin: Murfreesboro, Tennessee
- Genres: Power pop, college rock
- Years active: 1994–2002, 2004–2008
- Labels: Spongebath, Avex
- Past members: Seth Timbs (Piano/guitar/vocals); Brian Rogers (guitar, vocals); Sam Baker (drums, vocals); Ben Morton (bass); Justin Meyer (drums); Trev Wooten (bass); Jason Dietz (bass); Elliott Currie (drums); Kyle Walsh (drums); Brian Pitts (bass); Doug Payne (guitar)
- Website: www.myspace.com/fluidounces

Fluid Ounces (often stylized as Fl. Oz.) was an American power pop band formed in 1994 headed by pianist Seth Timbs, its lineup experienced frequent lineup changes, with Timbs being its only consistent member. Fluid Ounces' body of work spanned 12 years, most often being compared to the work of Ben Folds Five.

== History ==
=== 1993–1997: Formation and Big Notebook ===
Seth Timbs had been writing his own songs on both guitar and piano for years. By the time he had formed Seth Timbs & The Mad Hatters, he had already accumulated a rather large back catalog. After the Mad Hatters, Timbs played in the band Ella Minopy with his good friend Matt Mahaffey. Once Ella broke up, Timbs joined with bassist, Ben Morton, along with Elijah Shaw and local music legend/drummer Sam Baker (of local bands like the F Particles, These Are Houseplants, Blind Farmers, and Speake, among others) to form a new band.

The new band called itself Fl. Oz. (going by "Fluid Ounces" would come later when people didn't understand the band name in its abbreviated form) and began playing and recording in 1995 in Murfreesboro and Nashville, TN on the newly formed Spongebath Records.

With this line-up, they recorded their debut studio album, Big Notebook for Easy Piano, with producer Ross Rice of Memphis band Human Radio. Big Notebook for Easy Piano, released in June 1997, garnered dozens of positive reviews from publications such as Alternative Press, Magnet, CMJ, The Tennessean, Nashville Scene, and Billboard, and was eventually nominated for Rock Album of the Year by the Nashville Music Association.

=== 1998–2000: Old-Fashioned Way and Vegetable Kingdom ===
Seth Timbs in 1999.

After months of continued gigging and building a fan base, the band then recorded their second studio album, In the New Old-Fashioned Way, in Jackson, Mississippi with producer Richard Dortch. The recording for their second album was done live with minimal overdubs—the opposite approach they had taken with their debut album.

Their following in and around Nashville grew, and the band began touring around the country, especially after scoring a minor radio hit with "Vegetable Kingdom". In 1999, just before the official release of the second record, drummer Sam Baker left the band and was replaced by Justin Meyer. During this time, the band all shared a house together on Broad Street in Murfreesboro, sandwiched between a car dealership and a gravestone salesman, a fact that many journalists found humorous considering Timbs' fondness for noir themes and dark humor.

In the New Old Fashioned Way was also reviewed very positively in press outlets like Ink19, Allmusic, Nashville Scene, and Lollipop. This line-up continued gigging, and temporarily based themselves out of Chicago for midwest touring. Eventually, the band began working on songs for their third LP.

=== 2001–2008: Foreign Legion, Shebang, and breakup ===
After their second studio album, In the New Old-Fashioned Way, Fluid Ounces left Spongebath Records, which had release all of their previous works up to that point. Fluid Ounces subsequently received an offer for an accepted a record contract with the major Japanese label Avex Inc. in 2000, which re-released Old-Fashioned in Japan, earning the band a cult following in Japan. Their third studio album Foreign Legion was released on October 24, 2001, exclusively in Japan. Trev Wooten took over the bass duties in March 2001, and Sam Baker re-joined the following May as the band prepared to promote the release of the new record. Seth Timbs made several trips to Japan in order to promote the music, and he took the whole band with him in February 2002.

After that, the band essentially broke up as Seth moved to Los Angeles and the other members went on to other projects. Seth recorded the fourth album, The Whole Shebang, with Spike and Mallets drummer Kyle Walsh in hopes of releasing it in Japan. Instead, the album was released nationwide by Murfreesboro-based Vacant Cage Records as Seth returned to Middle Tennessee. Upon his return, Seth re-formed Fluid Ounces with Brian Rogers back on guitar, Brian G. Pitts on bass, and Kyle Walsh on drums.

Fluid Ounces recorded one more album in 2007, Instant Nostalgia, before disbanding in 2008. Timbs went on to release music in a solo capacity, including the 2011 album One Man Argument.

== Sound ==
Their sound was "piano pop", influenced by the likes of Elton John, Harry Nilsson, The Beatles, Elvis Costello, Ray Charles, They Might Be Giants, XTC, Randy Newman, and Thelonious Monk, and with their combined love of jazz, they created a very energetic sound with (mostly) upbeat tempos and complicated chord progressions. Because of the prominence of piano in the songs, the band often was often compared with contemporaries Ben Folds Five. However, as Stewart Mason with Allmusic noted:

"Unlike Folds' strained "look at me" cleverness, ivories-tickling leader Seth Timbs doesn't draw too much attention to himself lyrically, and his cohorts...[were] a much more cohesive and musically capable unit than the Five were."

== Discography ==
- Big Notebook for Easy Piano (1997)
- Vegetable Kingdom (1998)
- In the New Old-Fashioned Way (1999)
- Foreign Legion (2001)
- The Whole Shebang (2004)
- Instant Nostalgia (2007)
