= Museum Vrolik =

Anatomical museum in Amsterdam, Netherlands

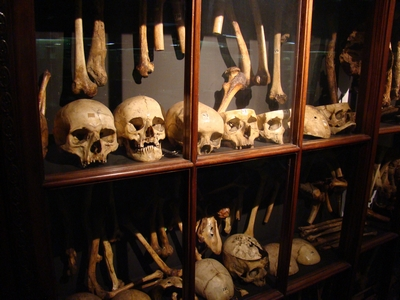
- Established: 1984
- Location: Building J0 of the Amsterdam University Medical Center, Amsterdam, Netherlands
- Coordinates: 52°17′40″N 4°57′37″E
- Type: Natural museum
- Owner: University of Amsterdam
- Website: www.museumvrolik.nl

Museum Vrolik is an anatomical museum renowned for its collection of medical heritage. The museum is housed in Building J0 of the Amsterdam University Medical Center in Amsterdam, the Netherlands.

== History ==
The museum's history begins around 1800 when Gerardus Vrolik (1775–1859) and his son Willem Vrolik (1801–1863) began assembling a collection of anatomical and medical specimens. Both were professors of anatomy at the Athenaeum Illustre, the predecessor of the University of Amsterdam. This collection formed the foundation of the museum.

In 1869, the collection was acquired by the Athenaeum Illustre, the forerunner of the University of Amsterdam. Since then, it has been expanded to include the Hovius collection and the Grevers dental collection. The museum's holdings are primarily used for education and research.

Willem Vrolik (1801–1863) was particularly interested in teratology (the study of congenital malformations) and made significant contributions to vertebrate teratology. He published extensively on conditions such as cyclopia, the pathogenesis of congenital anomalies, and conjoined twins. His work in the 1840s included the Handbook of Pathological Anatomy and Tabulae ad illustrandam embryogenesin hominis et mammalium, which won the Prix Montyon from the French Academy of Sciences in 1850.

The museum was formally established in its current location at the Academic Medical Center in 1984, though the collection has moved through various locations throughout Amsterdam over the years.

== Collections ==
The museum's collection comprises approximately 10,000 anatomical specimens. The core collection consists of 1,230 human anatomical preparations obtained between approximately 1750 and 1954. The specimens include:

=== Human specimens ===
- Siamese twins and cyclops preserved in formaldehyde
- Human and animal skeletons and skulls
- Anatomical wax models
- 840 anatomical preparations of fetuses and newborns, most with congenital defects
- 3,300 human bones and 1,150 human skulls, including specimens affected by diseases such as syphilis, tuberculosis, and rickets

=== Specialized collections ===
- The Hovius Collection: An 18th-century cabinet containing bones and skeletons affected by various diseases, originally assembled by Jacob Hovius and Andreas Bonn
- Dental Collection: 30 shelves of wax plates with diseased teeth, plus skulls, historical dentures, and forceps from dentist Grevers
- Brain Collection: About 22,000 wafer-thin slices of colored brain tissue kept in 1,760 drawers, collected between 1909 and 1945
- Animal Specimens: Including comparative anatomy collections and zoological specimens

=== Other notable items ===
- 7,400 glass slides and negatives used for teaching anatomy
- 530 plaster models and casts
- 410 wax models for embryological education and research
- Plant specimens donated in 2021
