= The Smiths Indeed =

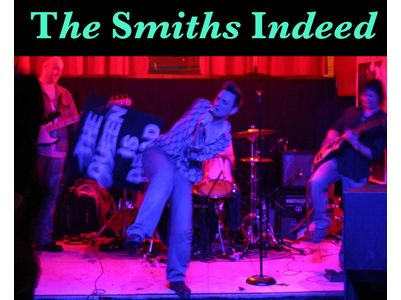
The Smiths Indeed live in Liverpool in 2006

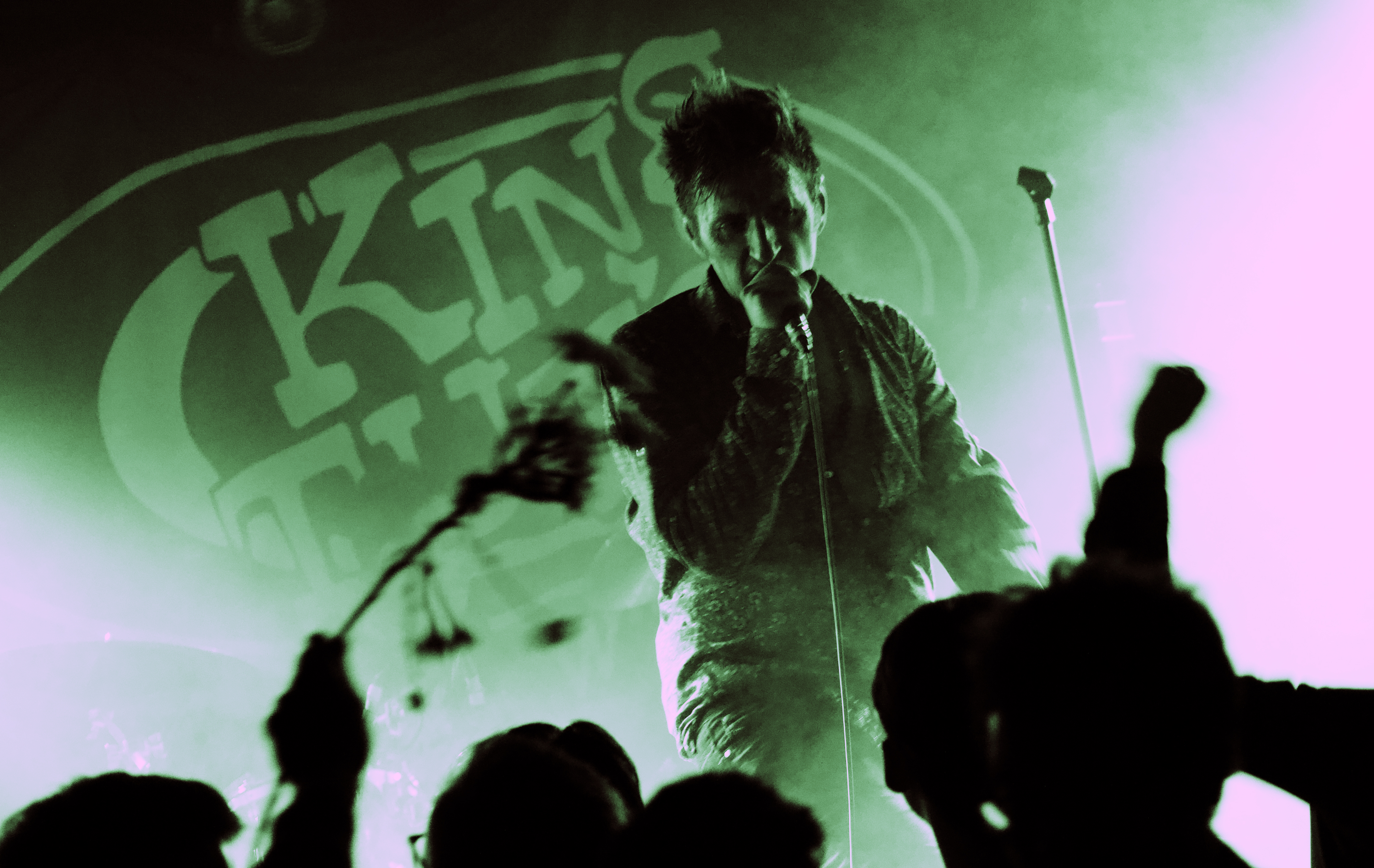
Morrissey Indeed live at Glasgow's King Tut's Wah Wah Hut in 2018

The Smiths Indeed were a tribute band dedicated to The Smiths. The band were from Liverpool in the North West of England. The Smiths Presumably are a continuation of The Smiths Indeed and are based in Antwerp, Belgium.

== History ==
The Smiths Indeed were formed in Liverpool in 2005. They played their first show in Glasgow at Bar Bia on 10 December 2005. They quickly gained a reputation for excellent live shows. They have played multiple extensive UK tours, playing prestigious venues such as Manchester Apollo, London Shepherd's Bush Empire and Glasgow Old Fruitmarket. They have also toured Europe and North America. In 2016, they played two shows at the Smiths Morrissey Convention at Avalon Hollywood in Los Angeles. The band strive to recreate the experience of seeing a mid-1980s Smiths concert. In order to get the atmosphere just right, they pay particular attention to using authentic instruments and equipment.

The Smiths Indeed name is taken from the run-out grooves etching on the vinyl of the 1984 Smiths single, "Heaven Knows I'm Miserable Now". A Smiths fanzine called Smiths Indeed also existed between 1986 and 1989.

The musicians were from various well-known Liverpool-based bands such as The Christians, Pete Wylie and Maudlin Rich.

In 2017, singer Jürgen Wendelen formed Morrissey Indeed as a continuation of The Smiths Indeed. Morrissey Indeed were based in Antwerp, Belgium and continued to tour in the UK and Europe. From 2019, they tour as The Smiths Presumably.

== Setlist ==
The setlist consists of songs from The Smiths's extensive repertoire. They didn't play any Morrissey solo songs. Sample setlist (Newcastle Academy, 7 December 2007):

Intro music: Dance Of The Knights (Prokofiev)
Sheila Take A Bow / Nowhere Fast / Heaven Knows I'm Miserable Now / This Charming Man / Still Ill / Reel Around The Fountain / What Difference Does It Make / Hand In Glove / These Things Take Time / William, It Was Really Nothing / Cemetery Gates / What She Said / Barbarism Begins At Home / Stretch Out And Wait / Stop Me If You Think You've Heard This One Before / Ask / Panic
The Queen Is Dead / Please Please Please Let Me Get What I Want / Girlfriend In A Coma / Bigmouth Strikes Again
Shoplifters Of The World Unite / There Is A Light That Never Goes Out

== Band members ==
- Jürgen Wendelen (Morrissey) - Vocals (2006 - 2017)
- Liam Atkinson (Johnny Marr) - Guitars (2006 -2007 / 2012 -2017)
- Bobby Kewley (Andy Rourke) - Bass
- Paul Tsanos (Mike Joyce) - Drums

== Band members (previous) ==
- Simon McKelvie (Johnny Marr) - Guitars (2006 / 2008 - 2011)
- Nick Astle (Johnny Marr) - Guitars (2005)
- Roy Verbeke (Andy Rourke) - Bass (2012)
- Peter Muldoon (Andy Rourke) - Bass (2008)
