= Spongebath Records =

Defunct American record label

- Founded: 1993; 33 years ago
- Founder: Richard Williams; Matt Mahaffey; Seth Timbs
- Defunct: September 20, 2002
- Distributors: US: Geffen Records; International: BMG Music
- Genre: Alternative rock; pop rock; college rock; electronic music; new wave; hip-hop
- Country of origin: United States
- Location: Murfreesboro, Tennessee

Spongebath Records was an independent record label based in Murfreesboro, Tennessee during the mid-nineties. During its heyday, Spongebath was often viewed as the vibrant center of Murfreesboro/Nashville's (and the Southeast's) music scene with a robust artist roster of critically acclaimed bands, singers, and songwriters.

From 1997 to 1999, Spongebath attracted national press and media attention for garnering co-label deals with DreamWorks Records (for Self's 1999 album Breakfast with Girls) and with Elektra Records (for the Katies self-titled 1999 album.) Bands/artists on Spongebath at one time or another included: Self, Fluid Ounces, the Katies, The Features, Count Bass D, Fleshpaint, The C60's, The New System, The Roaries, Gumption, Call Florence Pow, Ruby Amanfu, and Knodel.

== History ==
The label began as the brainchild of three people: Self frontman Matt Mahaffey (who had just dropped out of MTSU), singer/songwriter Seth Timbs (of Fluid Ounces), and Mahaffey's manager Rick Williams. Timbs, in fact, was the one who came up with the name "Spongebath."

In the mid-to-late '90s, there was a resurgence of interest in the Middle Tennessee rock scene, when Spongebath Records began to turn heads for signing promising, talented local bands like Self, Fluid Ounces, and The Features. Their office was located at 101 N. Maple in downtown Murfreesboro, and they were impossible to miss—the walls were painted in bright purple, yellow, and red colors, allowing it to stand out amidst a sleepy, rather drab and comfortably geriatric courthouse/downtown square.

The label even got the attention of Billboard, which ran a cover story in August 1997 chronicling Murfreesboro's rise as "an emerging music mecca," while other writers half-jokingly began to refer to the scene as "little Seattle." In reality, the Murfreesboro music scene was much more in line with progressive college-towns like Athens, Georgia and Austin, Texas—towns that had a rich history of championing indie rock and quality bands.

Regionally, the Spongebath brand became fairly synonymous with music ranging from the melodic indie pop of the Features, the Katies' radio-friendly brand of hard rock, or the genre-blurring hip-hop of Count Bass-D. All the Spongebath releases—largely recorded on minimal budgets—tended to receive critical acclaim. Even the packaging for Spongebath releases was different: Brian Bottcher's artwork for albums like Self's Breakfast with Girls, Fluid Ounces' In the New Old-Fashioned Way, or Count Bass-D's Art for Sale all had a distinct visual flair.

Self was the most successful of the label's artists, the band having modest success and developing a cult following with Subliminal Plastic Motives while getting spins for "So Low" and "Cannon" on MTV. Because of Spongebath's prime location (on the downtown Square and only a few doors down from Sebastian's, one of the most frequented clubs in Murfreesboro during that time) and casual, fun atmosphere, one would often find various labelmates/band members at the Spongebath offices answering phones, sending mail, making posters, folding t-shirts, or just hanging out. Spongebath encouraged fans of the label and of the bands to come by the office, and many did, either begging Williams to listen to their demo tape or simply asking how or where they could meet the label's most visible star, Matt Mahaffey. (One of the few if only bands that reportedly benefited from an unsolicited demo submission to the label was Call Florence Pow, two teenage fans of Mahaffey's. The strength of their demo got them a deal with Spongebath, with Mahaffey producing their first and only album for Spongebath, These Are the Plans.) Other bands were rumored to have lived, jammed and recorded in the Spongebath basement.

Spongebath succeeded as a breeding ground that fed hip new bands to major labels—however, it was unable to sustain itself, and was essentially finished by 2001.

At one point or another, Spongebath employees included: Rory Daigle (manager of the Features), Bingham Barnes (bassist for indie rock darlings Glossary), Andy McLenon (who went on to work at Sire Records), Andy Kotowicz (who went on to become the Vice President of Sales and Director of Marketing for Sub Pop), Matt Meeks (eventually co-managing The Features with Daigle), Justin Meyer (who went on to play drums for Fluid Ounces), Michael Eades (who created the company's website and online presence), Neill Dietz (whose brother, Jason, would later play bass for Fluid Ounces), Chris Moon, Chris Crawford, Harrison Rogers, Christian Rocco, Joli Hummel, and several others.

== Discography ==
- Soaking in the Center of the Universe Vol. 1 – Compilation
- Soaking in the Center of the Universe Vol. 2 – Compilation
- Big Notebook for Easy Piano – Fluid Ounces
- In the New Old-Fashioned Way – Fluid Ounces
- Vegetable Kingdom EP – Fluid Ounces
- Subliminal Plastic Motives (co-release with Zoo) – Self
- The Half-Baked Serenade – Self
- Breakfast with Girls (co-release with DreamWorks) – Self
- Brunch – Self
- Gizmodgery – Self
- The Features (EP) – The Features
- Thursday/Rabbit March (12") – The Features
- Violatin/Just Rhymin with Tock (12") – Count Bass D
- On the Reels/Piece of the Pie (12") – Count Bass D
- Art for Sale – Count Bass-D
- These Are the Plans – Call Florence Pow
- The Katies (co-release with Elektra Records) – The Katies
- The C60's – The C60's
- The White Hole – Knodel
