= Super Fake Nice =

EP by Self
- Released: July 29, 2014
- Recorded: 2010–2013
- Studio: Fresh Imperial (Tennessee)
- Genres: Pop rock; power pop
- Length: 17:47
- Label: El Camino Media
- Producer: Matt Mahaffey

Self chronology
Break out the Battle Tapes (2006)	Super Fake Nice (2014)	Ornament & Crime (2017)

Singles from Super Fake Nice
- 1. "Looks and Money" Released: November 28, 2011; 2. "Runaway" Released: July 11, 2014

Super Fake Nice is the third extended play by the American pop rock band Self (stylized as sElf), released through El Camino Media on July 29, 2014. Originally announced as an album in 2007, development began in 2010 following various standalone songs. It is the band's first studio release since Gizmodgery (2000), ending a 14-year break. The singles "Looks and Money" and "Runaway" supported it, further promoted by music videos and television performances. Upon release, Super Fake Nice was met with mixed reception for its production and lyricism.

== Background ==
In early January 2007, Matt Mahaffey announced Super Fake Nice via Myspace as Self's next full-length album. Its title was derived from an overheard conversation at a movie theater. That April, previous Self collaborator Ken Andrews expressed interest in distributing the album through his label Dinosaur Fight Records. In a 2009 interview, Mahaffey described its lyricism as "atypical to sElf" and stated disinterest in collaboration for it. He began writing the first song that would appear on the project, "Runaway", in 2010. In January 2012, Mahaffey finished his home studio in Franklin, Tennessee, entitled Fresh Imperial and co-designed by Mark Wenner. Several writing and recording sessions took place in the same month. An art contest was held by Mahaffey to determine the cover art of Super Fake Nice, which was won by Autumn and Brian Cutaia.

Later in 2012, independent record label El Camino Media was founded by Matt Messer. He was drawn to "Runaway", expressing interest in it as a radio single and inspiring Mahaffey to perform and record several more songs for the project. One of these songs was "Hey, Hipster", a commentary on hipster culture. For it, he drew inspiration from the songwriting of alternative rock band They Might Be Giants and Peter Gabriel's song "The Barry Williams Show". Following completion, Mahaffey self-described it as a "ratatouille of stuff I had lying around", stating a general desire to release material as Self. The project follows a pop rock/power pop style, using more refined production than the band's previous albums.

== Release ==
Self put out various songs before the release cycle of Super Fake Nice. On September 17, 2008, two rough demos were aired on the LGBT radio channel OutQ's Derek and Romaine show: "Orchid" and "Monogamy". These became available as a digital download in 2009. The band later put out "Could You Love Me Now?" on May 10, 2010. Though these songs wouldn't appear on the EP, "Monogamy" and "Could You Love Me Now?" were bundled together and released as a standalone single for Record Store Day on April 18, 2015.

"Looks and Money" was released as the EP's first single on November 28, 2011, preceding "Runaway" on July 11, 2014. The latter's music video features a band of cats pantomiming with instruments while several other cats move to the song's beat. Containing six songs, Super Fake Nice became available for pre-order on July 17 and was released through El Camino on July 29, becoming the band's first studio release since their fourth album, Gizmodgery (2000). On July 30, Self performed "Runaway" on Jimmy Kimmel Live!, marking the band's TV debut. A music video was released for "Looks and Money" in 2015, directed by Dave Foley and starring himself with Mary Lynn Rajskub.

== Reception ==
Professional ratings
Review scores
Source	Rating
The Fire Note	3/5 stars

Super Fake Nice received mixed reviews. Christopher Anthony of The Fire Note criticized the first two tracks for their "gloss ante" while praising the EP's other songs for reviving Self's older style. Stephen Thompson of NPR denounced the lyrics of "Runaway" as trivial but praised its instrumental, while Bob Boilen compared its catchiness to Mahaffey's career with commercial jingles. Lyndsey Parker of Rolling Stone described the song as a "catchy comeback track", likening its music video to Keyboard Cat and ranking it at number 10 on a list of the top 20 music videos of 2014.

== Track listing ==
All tracks are written by Matt Mahaffey.

Super Fake Nice track listing
No.	Title	Length
1.	"Runaway"	3:18
2.	"Subconscious Life"	3:12
3.	"Gonna Rock"	3:14
4.	"Hey, Hipster"	2:41
5.	"Looks and Money"	2:14
6.	"Splitting Atoms"	3:04
Total length:		17:47

Sample credits

- "Runaway" contains samples of "Do That Stuff", written by George Clinton, Gary Shider, and Bernie Worrell, as performed by Parliament.

== Personnel ==
Credits are adapted from the EP's liner notes.

- Matt Mahaffey – lead vocals, instruments, production, audio mixing, arrangement
- Mark Chalecki – mastering engineer
- New York Brass – horns (3, 5)
- Ahna Mahaffey – intro vocal (4)
- Autumn Cutaia – album artwork
- Brian Cutaia – album design
- Andy Harper – photography

== Release history ==
Release dates and formats
Region	Date	Format(s)	Label	Ref.
Various	July 29, 2014	Digital download; streaming	El Camino	
Various	September 30, 2014	CD	El Camino	
Various	October 2014	Vinyl LP	El Camino	
