= Looks and Money =

2011 single by Self

- Mahaffey (left) and Lynn Rajskub (right)

Single by Self

from the EP Super Fake Nice
- Released: November 28, 2011
- Recorded: 2010–2011
- Genre: Geek rock; indie pop
- Length: 2:14
- Label: El Camino Media
- Songwriter: Matt Mahaffey
- Producer: Matt Mahaffey

Self singles chronology
"Could You Love Me Now?" (2010)	"Looks and Money" (2011)	"Runaway" (2014)

Music video
- "Looks and Money" on YouTube

"Looks and Money" is a song by the American pop rock band Self (stylized as sElf), released on November 28, 2011. Originally released independently, it was later distributed by El Camino Media. It was the first single released for the band's third extended play Super Fake Nice. A music video for "Looks and Money" featuring Mary Lynn Rajskub and Dave Foley was later released in 2015 on the American comedy website Funny or Die.

== Background ==
In early January 2007, frontman Matt Mahaffey revealed via Myspace that Self had begun recording new music, intended for the band's next full-length studio album. On September 17, 2008, Mahaffey showcased two rough demos which were aired on the LGBTQ radio channel OutQ's Derek and Romaine show: "Orchid" and "Monogamy". The first song written that would appear on the project was "Runaway" in 2010. Over the next few years, several more songs and snippets would be released online to tease the upcoming project.

== Release and reception ==
Self independently released "Looks and Money" as a digital download on November 28, 2011. The track later appeared on Self's third extended play Super Fake Nice, distributed by El Camino Media, released on July 29, 2014. On September 17, Mahaffey performed "Looks and Money" live for Nashville Scene's "Live in the Morgue" with his daughter Ahna. The performance was later made available on the magazine's YouTube channel. The song was additionally performed for Self's Daytrotter session on March 25, 2015. Christopher Anthony of The Fire Note likened the lyricism and production of "Looks and Money" to Self's previous work, praising its "laid back but direct approach" and bouncy chorus as a highlight of Super Fake Nice.

== Music video ==
On October 12, 2011, American actress Mary Lynn Rajskub featured "Looks and Money" in an episode of her online comedy series Dicki. Rajskub reprised her role as Dicki for the song's official music video, directed by Dave Foley and premiering on the American comedy website Funny or Die on March 3, 2015. The video depicts Dicki giving Foley's character "a private dance in his stuffed-animal-filled lair", while Mahaffey does not make an appearance. Lyndsey Parker of Yahoo News lauded the music video as "nothing less than pure comedy gold", commenting that Mahaffey had outdone the video for "Runaway". Philip Obenschain of No Country for New Nashville called the video hilarious, stating that Self had "upped their video ante once again". Patrick Rodgers of Nashville Scene complimented "Rajskub's strangely lascivious dance moves" and encouraged fans to rate the video positively on Funny or Die, later ranking it as one of the top 32 music videos of 2015.

== Personnel ==
Credits adapted from the EP's liner notes.

- Matt Mahaffey – lead vocals, instruments, production, audio mixing, arrangement
- Mark Chalecki – mastering engineer
- New York Brass – horns
