= J. C. Adams =

American author

- Occupations: Porn journalist, editor, director and producer of gay male pornographic movies
- Writing career
- Period: 1995-
- Subject: Gay pornography
- Notable works: The Adams Report, Adam [ sic ] Gay Video Directory, Unzipped Monthly, Inside Porn Magazine, Gay Porn Times, XXX Showcase
- Website: www.gayporntimes.com

J. C. Adams (born June 6, 1970) is an American author, magazine editor, and reporter whose work focuses on the gay male pornographic industry, and a gay pornographic film director.

== Early life and education ==
Adams was born in 1970 in Pittsburgh, Pennsylvania. His father was a teacher. He has two brothers, one older and one younger.

He attended local Catholic elementary and secondary schools before graduating with a bachelor's degree from La Roche College.

== Writing career ==
Adams moved to Los Angeles, California in 1992. He began writing articles on various sex-related topics for Sex Vibe, an occasional magazine published by AIDS Project Los Angeles. He continued to contribute to the publication until its demise in 1998.

In August 1995, Adams began writing reviews of gay porn films for Adult Video News (AVN), a trade industry publication covering the straight, gay, bisexual, and transsexual porn industry. In 1997, the Adam Gay Video Directory, an annual publication of gay porn film reviews produced by Knight Publishing Corp., hired him to write reviews for the next edition of its annual film guide.

His work for AVN brought him to the attention of the gay adult film industry, and in 1995 he worked as a coordinator for the Gay Erotic Video Awards (GEVAs), an annual gay porn industry awards show sponsored by Gay Video Guide. In 1997, he became judging and nominations coordinator for the GEVAs, and continued in that role until the final awards show in 1998.

In 1998, Adams began reviewing gay porn films for RAD Video, a major online retailer of gay, straight and bisexual mainstream and adult films. That same year, Adams began writing a monthly column for the company's Web site in which he reported on industry events, technology, scandals, and other newsworthy topics.

Adams' first published mainstream work was a portrait of gay adult film agent and former rock promoter David Forest, which appeared in Genre magazine in October 1999.

Adams also began writing for Unzipped magazine (formerly Advocate Classifieds) in 1998, contributing articles, reviews, and interviews with gay porn stars. He was hired as the publication's editor in June 2000 after the editors decided to relaunch the biweekly publication as a monthly and produced the first issue of the new Unzipped (August 2000 issue). He left the magazine in January 2002.

Adams began syndicating his gay porn industry news column in March 2002. It began running on adult film Web sites such as NakedSword.com, but also on sites such as the mainstream GLBTQ portal site, OutinAmerica.com.

Adams did a great deal of freelance work for various gay porn studios during this time as well. He helped Sports and Recreation Video publish a print magazine, Inside Porn, from 2001 until it folded in 2003. And he did freelance publicity work for several gay porn studios, including All Worlds Video and MSR Videos.

He was hired by MSR Videos as a full-time publicist in November 2002. In 2003, he became a production manager for the studio. He left MSR Videos in October 2004 (the studio folded in January 2005 after the death of its founder and owner).

In 2004, Adams wrote an article for the peer-reviewed academic publication, Journal of Homosexuality. The article, "Sex Pigs: Why Porn is Like Sausage, or the Truth is That-Behind the Scenes-Porn Is not Very Sexy," discussed why adult film sex work is, in fact, work. The article was published as a chapter in the book Pornucopia: Eclectic Views on Gay Male Pornography, published by Haworth Press in 2005.

Adams has continued to work for the "Adam Gay Video Directory" since 1997. In June 2005, the company hired him as editor of its monthly gay porn review magazine, XXX Showcase, and as editor of their annual directory. The first issue of XXX Showcase he edited came out in August 2005. The first annual directory he edited covered gay adult films for 2005, featured Hot House Entertainment on its cover and was published December 2005. His second edition as editor featured Raging Stallion Studios performer François Sagat on its cover and was published December 2006. Adams' third edition as editor was published in December 2007 and featured COLT Studio Group performers.

Adams is at work on book titled It Just Happened, an oral history of the gay adult film industry.

I was going to call it an oral history," Scuglia tells me, "but people kept giggling. It's about how the Falcon aesthetic has infiltrated the mainstream via advertising and popular culture. Look at any fashion magazine and you see those naked, hairless, androgynous male models—and where does the aesthetic come from? Falcon movies! If you want to predict the next trend, just look at gay porn.

The "home base" for Adams' column is currently GayPornTimes.com, a Web site which he also helps manage and edit.

== Film work ==
Adams' career producing and directing gay adult films began in 2000. Real to Reel, an adult film company hired him to direct but the movie was never completed. However, one scene eventually appeared in the film Hitchhikers Delight released by Natural Wonders Productions in 2002.

Adams' growing familiarity with adult film production, a by-product of his work reporting from gay porn sets, soon led to writing and directing duties.

Adams' first credit adult film script was The List, produced by MSR Videos in 2003. He served as production manager in the film and produced three other titles that year as well.

In early 2004, Adams directed his first credited gay porn scenes, including the film Shooters from MSR Videos. The film was co-directed with Alizzi. Earlier that year, he had his first solo turn as a director, helming the All Worlds Video Catch Me. In 2005, Adams directed Sex With Strangers for All Worlds Video before returning to RAD Video, where he directed and produced Friends With Benefits.

In August 2006, Studio 2000 owner David McKay hired Adams as his new chief of production. Adams replaced Scott Masters, the award-winning director and co-founder of Studio 2000 who retired after selling the production house. McKay announced that Adams would manage all the studio's productions, while adult film performer and director Chad Donovan would handle talent development.

The first film he managed for the studio, Big Boat, was released in January 2007.

Since 2003, Adams has been a regular guest on the "Derek and Romaine Show," hosted by Derek Hartley and Romaine Patterson, on SIRIUS OutQ Satellite Radio.

== Published works ==
=== As J.C. Adams ===
- "Forest Fire." Genre. October 1999.

=== As Benjamin Scuglia ===
- Scuglia, Benjamin (2004), "Sex Pigs: Why Porn is Like Sausage, or the Truth is That-Behind the Scenes-Porn Is not Very Sexy", Journal of Homosexuality, 47 (3), Taylor & Francis: 185–188, doi:10.1300/j082v47n03_10, ISSN 0091-8369, OCLC 438420527, PMID 15451710, S2CID 2043131
- Morrison, Todd G (2004), "Sex Pigs", Eclectic views on gay male pornography : pornucopia, Harrington Park Press, ISBN 978-1-56023-291-9, OCLC 55960764
- Warren, Patricia Nell (2008), "Will You Be Joining Us on the AIDS Walk This Year?", Nine hundred & sixty nine : West Hollywood stories, iUniverse, ISBN 978-0-595-53327-5, OCLC 409683718
