= Medellín (song) =

2019 song by Madonna and Maluma

Single by Madonna and Maluma

from the album Madame X
- Language: English; Spanish
- Released: April 17, 2019
- Genre: Latin pop
- Length: 4:58
- Label: Interscope
- Songwriters: Madonna Ciccone; Juan Luis Londoño; Mirwais Ahmadzaï; Edgar Barrera
- Producers: Madonna; Mirwais

Madonna singles chronology
"Bitch I'm Madonna" (2015)	"Medellín" (2019)	"Crave" (2019)

Maluma singles chronology
"HP" (2019)	"Medellín" (2019)	"La Respuesta" (2019)

Music video
- "Medellín" on YouTube

"Medellín" is a song by American singer Madonna and Colombian singer Maluma released as the lead single from Madonna's fourteenth studio album Madame X (2019). The song was produced by Madonna, Mirwais, who wrote it alongside Maluma and Edgar Barrera. It was released as the lead single from the album on April 17, 2019, by Interscope Records. The song is named after the city in Colombia, in which Maluma was born, and is a Latin pop track with elements of reggaeton and dance-pop. Lyrically, it finds Madonna and Maluma reflecting on past struggles while dreaming about a trip to Medellín.

"Medellín" received generally positive reviews from music critics, who called the song Madonna's best work in years, while noting an improvement from her previous two lead singles. They also compared the song to Madonna's previous Latin-inspired releases, particularly "La Isla Bonita" (1987). It became Madonna's 47th chart topper on the Dance Club Songs chart, extending her record as the artist with the most number ones on the chart. It also reached the top 10 in Colombia, Hungary, and Venezuela, as well as on the digital charts in Finland and Portugal.

The accompanying music video was directed by Diana Kunst and Mau Morgó, and was released in April 2019 as part of a live MTV special. It features several scenes of Madonna and Maluma interacting, ending with a Latin-inspired feast taking place. The music video received acclaim from critics, who noted resemblances to Madonna's past work. The song was performed live by the singers at the 2019 Billboard Music Awards, with the performance featuring several digital effects that were provided by augmented reality, including four virtual versions of Madonna's Madame X alter-ego. "Medellín" was later performed during Madonna's Madame X Tour (2019–2020) and Maluma's 11:11 World Tour (2019–2021).

== Background and release ==
In 2017, Madonna relocated to Lisbon when seeking a top football academy for her son David Banda, who wanted to become a professional association football player. While living in the city, she began meeting artists; painters and musicians, who would invite her to "living room sessions". In the sessions, they would bring food and sit around the table, and musicians would start playing instruments, singing fado and samba music. For the album, she worked with longtime collaborator Mirwais, who had previously contributed to her albums Music (2000), American Life (2003) and Confessions on a Dance Floor (2005), as well as Mike Dean, who served as a producer on Rebel Heart (2015), and Diplo. During the recording process, Madonna presented an award at the 2018 MTV Video Music Awards in New York City, where she met Colombian singer Maluma backstage. Madonna mentioned that she and Mirwais started "listening to his music more closely and liked all the reggaeton that he does", as they wanted to do something slightly different, though still have a connection to the music he makes. Afterwards, they started working on music as Maluma began to comment and adding things, and eventually got into the studio together.

In February 2019, Maluma posted a photo on Instagram in the studio with Madonna. He revealed in an interview that they were working together, saying: "Madonna and I are cooking there together, making some beautiful songs. I'm very excited. That's a huge step for my culture, for Latin culture, it's very very big." On April 15, 2019, Madonna revealed the title of her upcoming fourteenth studio album, asMadame X, with the Maluma collaboration "Medellín" as the lead single. She also shared the cover art, featuring her sitting next to Maluma while wearing a wedding dress. Madonna revealed after the album was released that she decided to collaborate with Maluma after she realized that Maluma loves horses, which they bonded over a mutual love for. The singer described Maluma as "so great to work with", while adding that he is "one of the most easygoing, open, warm, generous – doesn't leave the studio until the work is done. Has great work ethic. I adore him. Nothing but great things to say about him." "Medellín" was premiered on April 17, 2019, through Beats 1 radio, where Madonna also was interviewed by Zane Lowe.

== Composition and lyrics ==
"Medellín"
A 20-second sample of the chorus to "Medellín", featuring Madonna and Maluma singing the bilingual verse "Ven conmigo, let’s take a trip/ Ven conmigo, I'll be so good for you".

"Medellín" was written by Madonna, Maluma, Mirwais and Edgar Barrera, while production was handled by the singer and Mirwais. "Medellín" is named after the city in Colombia where Maluma was born, being written bilingually in English and Spanish. Musically, it is a Latin pop song, with elements of "classic" reggaeton and a "breezy" dance-pop sound, which is centered around a "classic cha-cha-chá groove". According to the sheet music published by Musicnotes.com, "Medellín" is set in Time signature of common time with a tempo of 92 beats per minute. It is composed in the key of A♭ major, following a basic sequence of A♭–G♭–E♭ in its chord progression throughout its verses.

Madonna begins the song by whispering the verses, "One, two, one, two, one two, cha cha cha", while she delivers "breathy" vocals in an ASMR-like style and later she sings "reflective" lyrics: "I took a pill and had a dream/ I went back to my seventeenth year/ Allowed myself to be naïve/ to be someone I've never been." Maluma then begins his part by singing in Spanish, asking Madonna to take a trip with him to Medellín, with him acting as her tour guide. At one point, Maluma references Madonna's hometown, Detroit: "And if you want, we'll go to Detroit (You know)/ If I know where you come from, then I know where to go." Interspersed with Maluma's vocals, Madonna sings about how "another me can now begin" and does not have to hide herself for once. As the song reaches the chorus, the musicians sing, "Ven conmigo, let's take a trip/ Ven conmigo, I'll be so good for you", in a "lovey-dovey call-and-response" alongside a "deep house euphoria". Madonna also references Medellín's violent past from when it was the home base of narcoterrorist Pablo Escobar as she sings, "We built a cartel just for love/ Venus was hovering above us."

== Critical reception ==
"Medellín" was met with mostly positive reviews from music critics. Rolling Stone's Jon Blistein deemed it "sultry and slinky", further commenting that the song "moves effortlessly between a sparse, understated verse and a brilliant chorus bursting with deep house euphoria". Also from the magazine, Rob Sheffield considered it "scandal-bait". Writing for NME, Charlotte Gunn called the song a "surprising, self-reflective gem of a pop song", as well as "arguably [Madonna's] best work in years". For Variety, Jem Aswad felt that while "Medellín" was not "the dancefloor-filling that fans might be hoping for, it's a sultry and promising introduction to Madonna's latest era". Sal Cinquemani from Slant Magazine compared the track to Madonna's 1987 single "La Isla Bonita", and highlighted her "sugary harmonies" that "balance out Maluma’s gigolo routine with a dreamy sweetness". In his review of the song, Owen Myers of The Guardian, said it was the singer's "most subdued lead single since 1998’s stately 'Frozen'"; nonetheless, he concluded that the song was a "potent reminder of Madonna's genre-mashing skills" and proved that she's "well equipped to weather the demands of today’s listening trends while bringing global styles into her own world". On a similar note, Gay Times' Daniel Megarry ranked it as the third best song on Madame X, and deemed it her "most risky" lead single since "American Life" (2003), and said that, with time, it would become "one of her best". Jaime Tabberer, from Gay Star News, opined that the song was "undeniably fresh", "relaxed" and "catchy", and a better lead single than "Living for Love" (2014) and "Give Me All Your Luvin'" (2012). Eve Barlow of Vulture noted that it was Madonna's best lead single since "Hung Up" (2005), while also viewing the song as an updated version of "La Isla Bonita". Entertainment Weekly's Joey Nolfi called the song a "breezy summer anthem".

"Madge and Colombian mega-hottie Maluma's sultry, symmetrical game of cat-and-mouse is more pleasurable with every spin. Their riveting performance at April's BBMAs was the highlight of the entire night. Featured artists on Madonna records don't always work (who could possibly match her for personality?), but she confects pure ear candy with Maluma; there's genuine, easy chemistry there."

— Samuel R. Murrian from Parade, talking about "Medellín" on his list of Madonna's 100 best songs, in which it was placed at number 50

For the HuffPost's Daniel Welsh, "Medellín" was an "intriguing" listen, with him praising Madonna's lyrics for showing a more vulnerable side. Welsh said that despite seemingly following "the reggaeton trend that has been dominating the charts in recent years", it was far from "Madonna chasing a hit". Jeremy Helligar for Variety said "Medellín" is a "deceptively lovely opening statement that only hints at the fire raging just ahead". Helligar also praised the sexual tension between Madonna and Maluma, adimitting that the singer "sounds as inviting as she did cooing about the tropical island breeze in 1987", with the last part being a reference to "La Isla Bonita". From The Guardian, Ben Beaumont-Thomas said that even though it lacks an "absolutely diamond pop chorus", the song has an "elegant, sinewy melody that twines around you rather than jabbing you into submission". El Hunt from NME compared it to Madonna's 2008 single "Give It 2 Me". Louise Bruton from The Irish Times praised the song's playfulness and deemed it "quirky". According to Nicolas Hautman from Us Weekly, the song's "breezy and summery vibe almost make it feel like a subdued sequel to 'La Isla Bonita'". While reviewing Madame X, Daniel Welsh from HuffPost opined that the song was one of the album's "party tracks tinged with sadness".

Caryn Ganz from The New York Times gave a mixed review of the song and noted that "while its missteps aren't barbed enough to deflate a reverie", the song was "more like a stride in the right direction than an emphatic stomp forward". On a more critical note, Pitchfork's Jillian Mapes felt "Medellín" would be a bigger hit for Maluma rather than for Madonna. Mapes explained that while it was "more sonically restrained" than some of Madonna's previous works, she still sounded like she was struggling to "find a balance between campy bangers and more mature balladry", and that it was Maluma who truly stood out, writing that "the chorus pops off into a joyous celebration because of him". Concluding her review, Mapes referred to "Medellín" as "something of a sexy, stylish middle ground" for Madonna, but criticized the line "We built a cartel just for love" for being "cringe-y". Robbie Barnett from the Washington Blade, in a less favorable review, opined that "when compared to the other offerings on the album, this comes off as one of the weaker tracks".

== Commercial performance ==
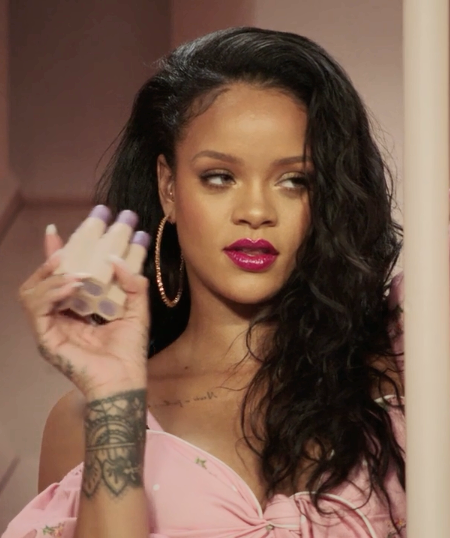
"Medellín" extended Madonna's record as the artist with the most number-one singles on the Dance Club Songs chart, increasing her lead on runner-up Rihanna.

In the United States, "Medellín" debuted at number one on the Billboard Latin Digital Songs chart after two days of sales and streaming activity, with sales of 5,000 digital copies. According to BuzzAngle, the song earned 16,000 units including streaming figures during the first-week in the US. It debuted at number 35 on the US Dance Club Songs chart for the week ending May 11, 2019, becoming Maluma's second song to enter the chart since "Hands on Me" (2018). On May 30, 2019, the song reached number seven on the chart, extending Madonna's record as the artist with the most top 10 singles on a Billboard component chart, with 67 singles. It eventually reached the summit of the Dance Club Songs chart on the week ending June 29, 2019, becoming her 47th and Maluma's 1st number-one single, extending Madonna's record as the artist with the most number ones on the chart. She pulled further ahead of the runner-up Rihanna, who had 33 chart-topping singles at the time. "Medellín" debuted at number 34 on the US Hot Latin Songs chart, for the week dated April 27, 2019. It became Madonna's fourth entry on the chart and her first since "Celebration" (2009). A week later, the song peaked at number 18, surpassing the peak of Madonna's single "You'll See" (1995), which reached number 21.

Across Europe, "Medellín" experienced moderate success. In Belgium, it peaked at number eight in the country's Flemish region and number seven in Wallonia, for the charts registering songs that are below the main charts. In France, the song debuted and peaked at number 11 on the French Downloads chart, while it reached number 3 in Greece's Digital Songs chart. "Medellín" also peaked at number nine on the charts in both Croatia and Hungary. In Italy, the song debuted at number 38 for the week ending April 25, 2019, and eventually reaching number 37 two weeks later. It received a gold certification by the Federazione Industria Musicale Italiana (FIMI), for sales of 25,000 units in the country. The song was less successful in Spain, peaking at number 67, while it achieved similar success in Switzerland, reaching number 69. "Medellín" debuted and peaked at number 87 on the UK Singles Chart, for the issue dated May 2, 2019, spending only one week on the chart. It further charted at number 15 on the Euro Digital Songs chart.

In Latin America, "Medellín" peaked at number 57 on the Argentina Hot 100 chart. The song also reached the top 10 in Colombia on the chart compiled by Monitor Latino. In Mexico, the song debuted at number 36 on the Mexico Espanol Airplay chart, ultimately reaching number 19 three weeks later. "Medellín" additionally reached numbers 17 and 5 in Panama and Venezuela, respectively. In Asia, the song reached number 12 on the China Airplay chart for its first issue, dated April 29, 2019. It additionally reached number 73 on the Japan Hot 100.

== Music video ==
=== Background and development ===
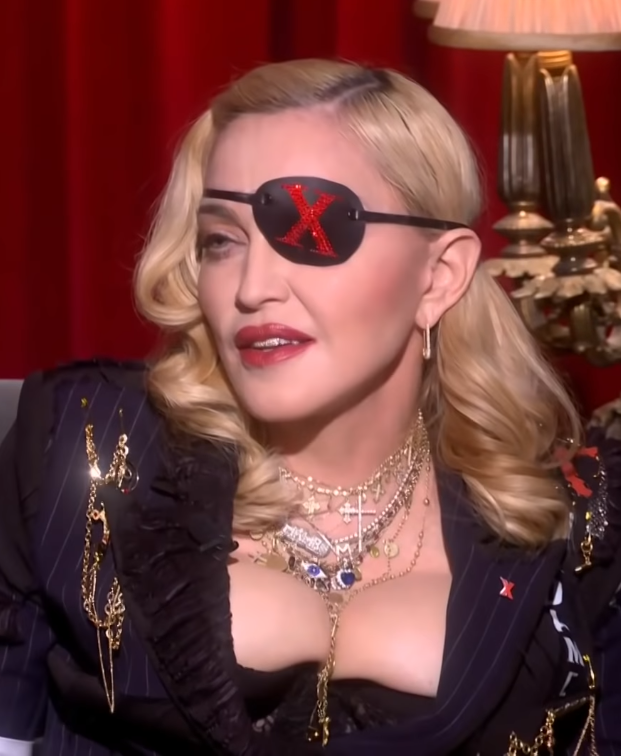
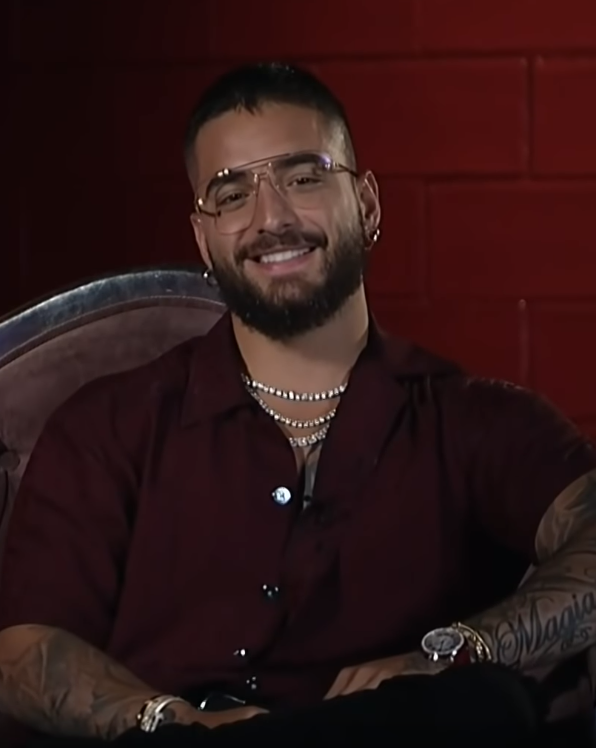
Madonna (left) and Maluma (right) during the world premiere of the music video at MTV's London studios

The accompanying music video was filmed at the Quinta Nova de Assunção palace near Lisbon. Madonna and her crew originally wanted to film the video at the Carmo Convent, but it did not happen as the building was under works. The visual was directed by Spanish director Diana Kunst and multi-disciplinary artist Mau Morgó. Madonna commented that she had seen Kunst's work first, and noted that the director was influenced by same painters and filmmakers which she was interested in, such as surrealist painters Frida Kahlo and Leonora Carrington. Madonna felt that her videos were "very painterly and I loved her color palette", as she wanted the video for "Medellín" to look like a painting.

The music video was released on April 24, 2019, during a live MTV UK and MTV special which was presented by Trevor Nelson that Madonna participated in from the channel's studios in London, while Maluma participated from Miami. It aired across numerous MTV networks and digital channels. At the special, fans took part from New York City, Milan and São Paulo via satellite, and had the opportunity to ask Madonna questions. Bruce Gillmer, the global head of Viacom and co-brand head of MTV International, noted that Madonna and MTV "have been intrinsically tied since their respective youths" and said they were "thrilled" to collaborate with her for the video's premiere.

The looks worn by Madonna in the music video were provided by a team led by the stylist and i-D fashion editor Ib Kamara, alongside styling consultant Eyob Yohannes and stylist Miguel Cervera, while Maluma's personal stylist Julian Rios created his own looks. Madonna's long elbow-length leather gloves were made in Italy at the New York-based designer Carolina Amato's accessory house Amato, and worn by the singer as a tribute to Martha Graham, who inspired her to create the Madame X alter-ego. She also wore a custom leather eye-patch by Gregory Kara that was decorated with a red X, made of Swarovski crystals throughout various scenes in the video, as well as a floor-sweeping tan wrap dress with red-tipped kimono-sleeves by fashion brand Palomo Spain during the opening scenes. In an interview with iHeartRadio's The Box, Madonna recalled that it was a "really fun video to make", explaining despite how "we worked 18 hours a day and it was freezing cold and I had to ride a horse at 6 o'clock in the morning with one eye, I had a ball".

=== Synopsis ===
A screenshot of the "Medellín" music video showing Madonna and Maluma dancing around in carnivalesque, Latin inspired wedding attires

The music video starts off with Madonna praying in an empty church room about her struggles, as well as hope for the future of humanity. Madonna says she had seen too much, and had been kidnapped, tortured and humiliated throughout her life, but still believes in the goodness of humans. The singer also thanks God for angels surrounding her, as well as being protected by the spirit of her mother. The shots are interrupted with black and white ones of Madonna running through the woods, wearing an eye-patch with an X that accompanies a long velvet dress, until she reaches a man wearing black, who is riding a horse. While she says, "From now on, I am Madame X, and Madame X loves to dance, because you can't hit a moving target", the screen shows the words "Madame X", "Medellín" and "Maluma" in capital letters.

"Medellín" then starts playing, with Madonna conducting a cha-cha-cha class and Maluma is her chosen dance partner. More shots follow that show them in bed displaying affection, smoking and drinking champagne, as well as Madonna playfully sucking Maluma's toe. Afterwards, a massive Latin inspired feast takes place in the style of a wedding, with Madonna invading the party by stomping on a large dining table while she wears a wedding dress, a white hat and a white eye-patch that is made out of pins. As she nears the end of the table where Maluma is sat, the two engage in a kiss, but the scene cuts to scenes of Madonna running through the woods. It is interrupted with scenes of Madonna dancing at the party as Maluma watches her, and he ends up removing a garter from her thigh. He follows to dance with her and more shots of Madonna dancing around a horse are shown. At the end of the video, the two of them ride off together into the morning sun.

=== Reception ===
Billboard magazine staff called the music video a "wild video" and a "cinematic clip", noting that it features a "raucous wedding celebration". Lyndsey Parker from Yahoo! Music deemed the video an "artsy clip", and complimented the video's "sizzling" chemistry between Madonna and Maluma. Attitude's Will Stroude called it a "captivating new visual" and "one of her most exciting in years". Kate Halfpenny of The New Daily complimented its "astonishing visuals" and noted that the horse scenes featured were reminiscent of soap opera Dynasty. Sandra Song from Paper called the music video a "fucked up fairy tale" and observed the array of visuals for Madonna's "larger-than-life" alter-ego in the video. According to Nylon's Allison Stubblebine, the video is "drenched in absolute excess and opulence", with Madonna "lounging in a formal gown alongside a silk-pajama-wearing Maluma" and "stomping down the dining table in a veiled cowboy hat to her new husband", and calling it "one hell of a party". Shakiel Mahjouri from Entertainment Tonight Canada called "Medellín" a "visually-stunning" music video in which Madonna "brings her rebellious spirit, using dance and song, into another dimension".

Marissa G. Muller of W magazine noted its "wild" nature, and also complimented Madonna and Maluma's chemistry throughout the video, while observing resemblances to the singer's past work, despite admitting that "that monologue, however, has little bearing on the rest of the video". Christopher Rudolph from NewNowNext noted nods to some of Madonna's "most iconic" past videos, such as "Human Nature" (1995) and "Like a Virgin" (1984). Hayley Maitland of Vogue UK also noted resemblances to Madonna's past work in the music video, such as "Like a Prayer" (1989) in the opening praying scene, while stating that the cowboy hat and the wedding dress she wore during the wedding scene recalled visuals for her albums Music and Like a Virgin (1984).

== Live performances ==
On April 19, 2019, it was confirmed by Billboard that Madonna and Maluma would perform "Medellín" live for the first time at the Billboard Music Awards, which would take place at the MGM Grand Garden Arena in Las Vegas on May 1 of that year. The performance featured four virtual versions of her Madame X alter ego – a secret agent, a musician, a cha-cha instructor and a bride. Elements also present included a garden, rain and bursting blasts of color, provided by augmented reality, marking the first time it was used on American television. The effects were made through volumetric capture and game engine Unreal Engine. Jamie King, Madonna's creative director, said he looked for something special for the performance and settled on the idea of augmented reality, as he wanted to explore a way to involve her Madame X personas into the performance, as well as the possibility of Madonna being able to perform with them. Attendees of the awards show were able to see only through the screens inside the arena.

After being introduced by Kelly Clarkson, Madonna started the performance laying beneath a virtual garden, wearing a "pirate-like getup" and an eye-patch with an X, as well as "retro pin-curled wave[d]" hair. As Maluma appeared while wearing silky black button-down, the stage transformed into a patio restaurant, and they danced together on the tables as well as with the virtual versions of Madame X. During the performance, the singers recreated scenes from the song's music video, including Maluma removing a garter from Madonna's thigh. After the performance, the song rose by 261% in streams to 2,200,000, increasing from 596,000. Andrew Unterberger from Billboard ranked it as the second best performance of the night, calling the performance "memorable" and saying it was "good to see that the pop legend certainly hasn't lost her ability to surprise and delight". The performance ultimately won the Best Use of AR in Live Broadcast category at the Lumiere Awards.

Madonna later performed "Medellín" on her Madame X Tour (2019–20). It was included in the "club section" of the show, with Madonna recreating the Billboard Music Awards performance. Maluma also appeared on the screens in various places around the set. For Ben Crandell of the Sun-Sentinel, it was an "upbeat favorite of the night". The performance was included on the live album Madame X: Music from the Theater Xperience. Additionally, the song was performed for select dates during Maluma's 2019–21 11:11 World Tour. Madonna and Maluma performed the track along with her 2000 single "Music" during his Medallo en el mapa concert in Medellín, Colombia, on April 30, 2022. Madonna wore a pink dress and braids, and according to Agencia EFE, her appearance on stage was the climax of the concert, as both artists "took over the stage dancing and provoking in the most suggestive Madonna style" during the performance of the song.

== Track listing and formats ==
Digital download / streaming

1. "Medellín" – 4:58

Digital download / streaming (Remixes)

1. "Medellín" (Offer Nissim Madame X in the Sphinx) – 5:30
2. "Medellín" (Offer Nissim Set Me Free Remix) – 5:10

Digital download / streaming (Robbie Rivera Juicy Mix)

1. "Medellín" (Robbie Rivera Juicy Mix) – 5:31

Digital download / streaming (Erick Morillo Mix)

1. "Medellín" (Erick Morillo Mix) – 3:20

Digital download / streaming (Remixes, Pt. 2)

1. "Medellín" (Offer Nissim Madame X in the Sphinx with No Intro) – 5:12
2. "Medellín" (LA95 Dancefloor Legend X Remix) – 4:31
3. "Medellín" (John Christian & DJLW Remix) – 4:15
4. "Medellín" (Sak Noel Remix) – 3:25
5. "Medellín" (LA95 Remix) – 5:29

Digital download / streaming (Remixes)

1. "Medellín" (Offer Nissim Madame X in the Sphinx with No Intro) – 5:12
2. "Medellín" (LA95 Dancefloor Legend X Remix) – 4:31
3. "Medellín" (John Christian & DJLW Remix) – 4:15
4. "Medellín" (Sak Noel Remix) – 3:25
5. "Medellín" (LA95 Remix) – 5:29
6. "Medellín" (Offer Nissim Madame X in the Sphinx) – 5:30
7. "Medellín" (Offer Nissim Set Me Free Remix) – 5:10
8. "Medellín" (Erick Morillo Mix) - 3:20
9. "Medellín" (Robbie Rivera Juicy Mix) - 5:30

== Credits and personnel ==
- Madonna – writer, vocals, producer
- Maluma – writer, vocals
- Mirwais – writer, producer
- Edgar Barrera – writer

Credits and personnel adapted from the liner notes of Madame X.

== Charts ==
=== Weekly charts ===
Weekly chart performance for "Medellín"
Chart (2019)	Peak position
Argentina (Argentina Hot 100)	57
Argentina Anglo (Monitor Latino)	1
Belgium (Ultratip Bubbling Under Flanders)	8
Belgium (Ultratip Bubbling Under Wallonia)	7
Canada Digital Songs (Billboard)	37
China Airplay (Billboard)	12
Colombia (Monitor Latino)	10
Colombia (National-Report)	32
Croatia (HRT)	9
Euro Digital Songs (Billboard)	15
Finland Digital Songs (Billboard)	5
France Downloads (SNEP)	11
Greece Digital Songs (Billboard)	3
Hungary (Single Top 40)	9
Italy (FIMI)	37
Italy Airplay (EarOne)	6
Israel (Media Forest)	7
Japan Hot 100 (Billboard)	73
Mexico (Billboard Mexican Espanol Airplay)	19
Netherlands (Dutch Top 40 Tipparade)	20
New Zealand Hot Singles (RMNZ)	37
Panama (Monitor Latino)	17
Poland Airplay (ZPAV)	32
Portugal Digital Songs (Billboard)	4
Romania (Airplay 100)	81
Scottish Singles Sales (Official Charts)	42
Slovakia Airplay (ČNS IFPI)	53
Spain (PROMUSICAE)	67
Sweden Digital Songs (Billboard)	5
Switzerland (Schweizer Hitparade)	69
UK Singles (Official Charts)	87
US Dance Club Songs (Billboard)	1
US Hot Latin Songs (Billboard)	18
Venezuela (National-Report)	5

=== Year-end charts ===
Yearly chart performance for "Medellín"
Chart (2019)	Position
Hungary (Single Top 40)	86
Tokyo (Tokio Hot 100)	47
US Dance Club Songs (Billboard)	27
US Latin Digital Song Sales (Billboard)	17

== Certifications ==
Region	Certification	Certified units/sales
Brazil (Pro-Música Brasil)	Platinum	40,000^{‡}
Italy (FIMI)	Gold	25,000^{‡}
^{‡} Sales+streaming figures based on certification alone.

== Release history ==
Release dates and formats for "Medellín"
Region	Date	Format(s)	Version	Label	Ref.
Various	April 17, 2019	Digital download; streaming	Original	Interscope	
Italy	April 17, 2019	Radio airplay	Original	Universal	
Various	May 9, 2019	Digital download; streaming	Remixes	Interscope	
Various	June 14, 2019	Digital download; streaming	Robbie Rivera Juicy Mix	Interscope	
Various	June 14, 2019	Digital download; streaming	Erick Morillo Mix	Interscope	
Various	June 14, 2019	Digital download; streaming	Remixes, Pt. 2	Interscope	

== See also ==
- List of Billboard number-one dance songs of 2019
- List of airplay number-one hits in Argentina
