= No Se Me Quita =

2019 song by Maluma

Single by Maluma featuring Ricky Martin

from the album 11:11
- Language: Spanish
- English title: "It Doesn't Go Away"
- Released: August 30, 2019
- Genre: Dancehall
- Length: 3:39
- Label: Sony Latin
- Songwriters: Jesús Herrera "Dale Play"; Oscar Hernández "Oscarsito"; Juan Luis Londoño; Andrés Castro; Servando Primera; Édgar Barrera
- Producer: Édgar Barrera "Edge"

Maluma singles chronology
| "Instinto Natural" (2019) | "No Se Me Quita" (2019) | "Qué Pena" (2019) |

Ricky Martin singles chronology
| "Fiebre" (2018) | "No Se Me Quita" (2019) | "Cántalo" (2019) |

Music video
- "No Se Me Quita" on YouTube

"No Se Me Quita" (transl. "It Doesn't Go Away") is a song recorded by Colombian singer Maluma, featuring Puerto Rican singer Ricky Martin for Maluma's fourth studio album, 11:11. It marked the second collaboration between the singers, following "Vente Pa' Ca" (2016). The song was written by Jesús Herrera, Oscar Hernández, Maluma, Andrés Castro, Servando Primera, and Édgar Barrera, while the production was handled by Barrera. It was released by Sony Music Latin on August 30, 2019, as the fourth single from the album. A Spanish language dancehall romantic song with very soft urban rhythms and elements of pop and tropical, it is about thinking of an amazing night with a person and a lustful connection between two strangers.

"No Se Me Quita" received highly positive reviews from music critics, who complimented its danceable and catchy rhythm. The song was commercially successful in Latin America, reaching number one in Chile, Guatemala, and Mexico, as well as the top 10 in six other Latin American countries. It was certified quadruple platinum in Mexico and Latin platinum in the United States. The accompanying music video was directed by Nuno Gomes and filmed in Miami, Florida. It depicts Maluma falling in love with a pretty lifeguard on a beach and plans a strategy with Martin to get the woman's attention and steal a kiss from her. The track was included on the set list for Maluma's the 11:11 World Tour.

== Background and release ==
On September 23, 2016, Ricky Martin and Maluma released their first collaboration, "Vente Pa' Ca". The song became one of the biggest Spanish-language songs of 2016, reaching number one in seven countries, as well as Billboard's Latin Airplay, Latin Pop Airplay, and Tropical Airplay charts. On February 9, 2019, Maluma announced that his fourth studio album would be titled 11:11 and shared its concept with his followers on Instagram:

11:11 is a direct signal from our guides, angels and teachers to establish a moment of connection, synchronicity and awareness with ourselves, with the whole, it is a wake-up call, it is a door to meditate, to listen to our intuition, to look in our interior, time to stop and feel the subtle energies of the universe.

Almost three months later, on May 1, Maluma shared the artwork and track list for 11:11, which featured a collaboration with Martin, and announced that it would be released on May 17, 2019. The album was released for digital download and streaming by Sony Music Latin on the specified date. "No Se Me Quita" was included as the third track on the album, marking the second collaboration between the two artists. On August 30, 2019, the track was released as the fourth single from the album.

== Music and lyrics ==
"No Se Me Quita"
A 15-second sample of the chorus, which features a "midtempo" melody.

Musically, "No Se Me Quita" is a Spanish language dancehall song, written by Jesús Herrera, Oscar Hernández, Maluma, Andrés Castro, Servando Primera, and Édgar Barrera. Its production was handled by Barrera, and the song features very soft urban rhythms and elements of pop and tropical. The track runs for a total of 3 minutes and 39 seconds.

Lyrically, "No Se Me Quita" which translates to "It Doesn't Go Away" in English, is about thinking of an amazing night with a person and a lustful connection between two strangers. They describe a memorable kiss from the night before and the unforgettable taste of a new lover's lips, confessing that after a passionate kiss, it is hard to forget the moment that was shared. The "romantic" lyrics include: "Y ahora me tiene la mente en la luna y los pies en el piso" ("And now it has me mind on the moon and feet on the floor").

== Critical reception ==
Upon release, "No Se Me Quita" was met with universal acclaim from music critics. Suzette Fernandez from Billboard ranked it as one of five essential tracks from 11:11, saying it "will stick on your mind all day" and "its pop sound will make you dance". Natalia Trejo from ¡Hola! labeled the song "[a] catchy hit", and NME's Nick Levine described Martin's chorus as "brilliant". In his review for Forbes, Jeff Benjamin celebrated the song for boasting "a breezy enough summer vibe to become a big tropical hit as the weather warms up". HipLatina's Johanna Ferreira named it the most important track featured on the album. Brittny Pierre from Vibe described the collaboration as a "shining moment" for Maluma and labeled the song "a sexy mid-tempo track that will easily get stuck in your head". Pip Ellwood-Hughes from Entertainment Focus gave it a positive review, saying it is "a catchy track and one that demands to be turned up loud".

Writing for Entertainment Tonight Canada, Shakiel Mahjouri described Maluma and Martin as "the most ambitious crossover event in Latin music", and Brandon Voss from NewNowNext called them "the dream duo". Also, an author of ¡Hola! entitled them "the kings of rhythm when they come together", and Los 40's Paloma Diaz Espiñeira named them "the perfect tandem", saying "No Se Me Quita" is "the perfect song to take advantage of the last weeks of summer" and it "adapts perfectly to the musical style of both". Noelia Bertol from Cadena Dial stated: "The tandem formed by these two artists is synonymous with success." Umberto Antonio Olivo from Periodico Daily complimented the track, saying it "is an energetic and danceable song, a deliciously summery song that promises to accompany us at least until the end of September". He continued to compare Martin with Maluma, expressed that "Martin's timbre is more interesting and engaging than Maluma's", emphasizing that he does not mean that Maluma is not good, but the comparison with Martin "cannot be made easily anyway".

Samy Laurent from Têtu labeled it "a nice musical piece, which makes you want to wiggle under the sun of the Indian summer". Writing for Observatório G, Matheus Henrique Menezes described the track as "a song that promises to be a hit". An author of Radio Cooperativa called it "[a] joyful and danceable song", and Javier Villacañas from Cadena 100 named it "one of the strong themes on the album". NRJ staff praised "No Se Me Quita", saying: "The catchy piece with Latino accents makes you want to wiggle on the beach." Thom Jurek from AllMusic described the song as "a sweet, breezy, infectious tropical summer groover". A writer of La República appreciated it as "a hit of the summer", and Daniela Llamas from iHeartRadio ranked it as one of the top 5 songs to enjoy "Acapulco en la azotea".

== Commercial performance ==
"No Se Me Quita" debuted at number 47 on Billboard's Mexico Airplay chart on September 14, 2019, becoming Maluma's 24th entry on the chart and Martin's 12th. It subsequently reached number one on the chart issue dated October 26, 2019, giving Maluma his tenth number-one hit and Martin's second. It also peaked at number one on the Billboard Mexico Espanol Airplay and Top 20 General Monitor Latino Mexico charts. The song was certified quadruple platinum by the Asociación Mexicana de Productores de Fonogramas y Videogramas (AMPROFON), for track-equivalent sales of over 240,000 units in the country. In addition to Mexico, "No Se Me Quita" also experienced commercial success in several other Latin American countries. It reached number one in Chile and Guatemala, and peaked in the top 10 of Argentina, Bolivia, Ecuador, El Salvador, Uruguay, and Venezuela. In Costa Rica and on the Monitor Latino Latin America chart, it reached the top 20, as well as Paraguay's monthly chart. The song was also certified Latin platinum by the Recording Industry Association of America (RIAA), for track-equivalent sales of over 60,000 units in the United States.

== Music video ==
=== Development and synopsis ===
A screenshot from the music video, depicting Maluma and Martin partying in a fish tank.

An accompanying pseudo video was released via Maluma's YouTube channel, upon the release of the album. On July 16, 2019, Maluma and Martin shared a photo of themselves on the set of filming "No Se Me Quita" music video with the caption, "Esta combinación no falla parceros..." ("This combination does not fail..."), announcing that the visual would be released "soon". A few weeks later, on August 28, Maluma shared snippets of the video on Instagram, letting his followers know that it is set for release on August 30, 2019. The visual was released simultaneously with the song's release as a single on the specified date. It was filmed in Miami, Florida, and directed by Nuno Gomes, who had previously directed the videos for Maluma's 2019 singles "HP", "11 PM" and "Instinto Natural".

The video, which is inspired by the American action drama television series Baywatch, begins with Maluma and Martin partying on a beach. They are surrounded by several dancing lifeguards in yellow bathing suits, a giant sandcastle, and pink inflatable flamingos. Martin is seen in all white and dances along with the lifesavers. The story goes like Maluma is in love with the beautiful leading lady of the lifeguards and plans a strategy with Martin to get the dark-haired woman's attention and steal a kiss from her. He pours a bucket of cold water over his head to role play being drowned. He pretends to need saving by CPR, falling helplessly on the sand. Also, Martin helps his friend on his mission to get the woman's attention. Finally the woman saves playful Maluma by mouth-to-mouth resuscitation. In another scene, Martin and Maluma are dressed in stylish ensembles and party in a fish tank while the women and fish dance around them. Suzy Exposito from Rolling Stone noticed the similarity between the underwater scenes in "No Se Me Quita" and Martin's 2000 music video "She Bangs".

=== Reception ===
The music video was met with positive reviews from music critics. NewNowNext's Brandon Voss described it as "eye-popping" and said that it "serves a fishy fantasy for the Latin lovers". Liz Calvario from Entertainment Tonight labeled it "[a] colorful and fun music video" and wrote: "We can't get enough of it." Daniel Megarry from Gay Times called it "sizzling" and Entertainment Tonight Canada's Shakiel Mahjouri described it as "visually popping and hip-swaying". Sheila Guzmán from Show News celebrated the visual for showing "the evident good relationship between both interpreters" and appreciated it as "a very summery video, full of yellow and green tones". As of May 2022, the video has received over 200 million views on YouTube.

== Live performances and appearances in media ==
"No Se Me Quita" was included on the set list for Maluma's the 11:11 World Tour. Jesse Huerta performed the song as "Zombie" on the second season of the Mexican television series ¿Quién es la máscara? in 2020. Panelists decided he could save his identity and continue in the competition. The following year, Emmanuel Palomares performed the track on the third season of the competition as "Jocho".

== Credits and personnel ==
Credits adapted from Tidal.

- Maluma – vocals, associated performer, composer, lyricist, executive producer
- Ricky Martin – vocals, associated performer, featured artist
- Jesús Herrera "Dale Play" – composer, lyricist
- Oscar Hernández "Oscarsito" – composer, lyricist
- Andrés Castro – composer, lyricist
- Servando Primera – composer, lyricist
- Édgar Barrera "Edge" – composer, lyricist, producer, engineer, executive producer
- Enrique Larreal – engineer
- Mike Fuller – mastering engineer
- Luis Barrera Jr. – mixing engineer

== Charts ==
=== Weekly charts ===
Weekly peak performance for "No Se Me Quita"
| Chart (2019–2020) | Peak position |
|---|---|
| Argentina Hot 100 (Billboard) | 26 |
| Argentina (Monitor Latino) | 2 |
| Bolivia (Monitor Latino) | 6 |
| Chile (Monitor Latino) | 1 |
| Costa Rica (Monitor Latino) | 11 |
| Ecuador (National-Report) | 7 |
| El Salvador (Monitor Latino) | 10 |
| Guatemala (Monitor Latino) | 1 |
| Latin America (Monitor Latino) | 19 |
| Mexico (Billboard Mexican Airplay) | 1 |
| Mexico (Monitor Latino) | 1 |
| Panama Urbano (Monitor Latino) | 16 |
| Paraguay Urbano (Monitor Latino) | 10 |
| Uruguay (Monitor Latino) | 4 |
| US Latin Digital Song Sales (Billboard) | 19 |
| Venezuela (Monitor Latino) | 4 |

=== Monthly charts ===
Monthly chart position for "No Se Me Quita"
| Chart (2019–2020) | Peak position |
|---|---|
| Paraguay (SGP) | 17 |

=== Year-end charts ===
2019 year-end chart performance for "No Se Me Quita"
| Chart (2019) | Position |
|---|---|
| Argentina (Monitor Latino) | 49 |
| Bolivia Latin (Monitor Latino) | 97 |
| Chile (Monitor Latino) | 50 |
| Costa Rica Urbano (Monitor Latino) | 49 |
| Ecuador Urbano (Monitor Latino) | 95 |
| El Salvador Pop (Monitor Latino) | 71 |
| Guatemala Pop (Monitor Latino) | 98 |
| Latin America (Monitor Latino) | 99 |
| Mexico (Monitor Latino) | 91 |
| Paraguay Urbano (Monitor Latino) | 87 |
| Uruguay (Monitor Latino) | 49 |
| Venezuela (Monitor Latino) | 75 |

2020 year-end chart performance for "No Se Me Quita"
| Chart (2020) | Position |
|---|---|
| Argentina (Monitor Latino) | 21 |
| Chile (Monitor Latino) | 11 |
| Costa Rica (Monitor Latino) | 68 |
| Ecuador (Monitor Latino) | 48 |
| El Salvador Pop (Monitor Latino) | 77 |
| Guatemala Pop (Monitor Latino) | 97 |
| Panama Urabno (Monitor Latino) | 97 |
| Paraguay (Monitor Latino) | 82 |
| Peru Urbano (Monitor Latino) | 62 |
| Uruguay (Monitor Latino) | 20 |
| Venezuela (Monitor Latino) | 50 |

== Certifications ==
Certifications and sales for "No Se Me Quita"
| Region | Certification | Certified units/sales |
|---|---|---|
| Brazil (Pro-Música Brasil) | Gold | 20,000^{‡} |
| Mexico (AMPROFON) | 4× Platinum+Gold | 270,000^{‡} |
| Spain (Promusicae) | Gold | 30,000^{‡} |
| United States (RIAA) | Platinum (Latin) | 60,000^{‡} |
^{‡} Sales+streaming figures based on certification alone.

== Release history ==
Release dates and formats for "No Se Me Quita"
| Region | Date | Format(s) | Label | Ref. |
|---|---|---|---|---|
| Latin America | August 30, 2019 | Contemporary hit radio | Sony Music Latin | |

== See also ==
- List of Billboard Mexico Airplay number ones
- List of number-one songs of 2019 (Mexico)
