= Runaway (Self song) =

2014 single by Self

Single by Self

from the EP Super Fake Nice
- Released: July 11, 2014
- Recorded: 2010–2014
- Genre: Pop rock; power pop
- Length: 3:18
- Label: El Camino Media
- Songwriter: Matt Mahaffey
- Producer: Matt Mahaffey

Self singles chronology
"Looks and Money" (2011)	"Runaway" (2014)	"Monogamy" (2015)

Music video
- "Runaway" on YouTube

"Runaway" is a song by the American pop rock band Self, released on July 11, 2014. Distributed by El Camino Media, it was the second single for the band's third EP Super Fake Nice. The track utilizes power pop instrumentation that samples the song "Do That Stuff" by American funk band Parliament. A music video for "Runaway" was released alongside the single, featuring cats pantomiming with instruments. The video went viral, helping the single commercially succeed.

== Background ==
Since 1990, Self frontman Matt Mahaffey had created multiple songs sampling Parliament's song "Do That Stuff", denouncing them as demos and withholding them. His fifth attempt came in 2010 as "Runaway", the first time he found the product satisfactory. Two years later, Matt Messer of El Camino Media heard a demo of "Runaway". He was drawn to it and expressed interest in marketing it as a radio single. This led Mahaffey to sign his band Self to the independent record label, recording more songs to form the EP Super Fake Nice (2014). Mahaffey finished the song in 2014, releasing it as the EP's second single on July 11. The band performed "Runaway" on Jimmy Kimmel Live! on July 30, becoming the band's first televised live performance.

== Composition ==
"Runaway"
A 22-second sample of "Runaway" by Self, where the first chorus is heard.

"Runaway" is entirely performed by Mahaffey, prominently using electric guitar, arpeggiating synthesizers, bass guitar, and drums in a pop rock/power pop soundscape along the major scale. The song begins with a soft xylophone and flute melody, with the latter being panned to the left. Its verses transition between an isolated bass with Mahaffey's vocals on top and the song's entire selection of instruments. Drums build into each chorus, adding vocal harmonies. The instrumentation pulls back at the end of each chorus, cycling back into verses. A guitar solo is played during the bridge. "Runaway" uses an 8-bar verse–chorus form with a tempo of 97 beats per minute and a time signature of 4/4, resulting in a length of 3 minutes and 18 seconds across 80 bars. The song lyrically follows a conversation between the narrator and a girl, with Mahaffey warning against her reckless actions of escapism and their eventual consequences with a concerned tone.

== Music video ==
A music video for "Runaway" was directed by Ballard C. Boyd and released on July 11, 2014. The video features a band of cats playing instruments while several other cats move to the beat of the song and play with cat toys. Later into the video, cats are shown jumping through the air, driving a car, and being blown with hair dryers. It ends with a cat eating from a food bowl labeled "Runaway" and a disclaimer that no cats were harmed. Filmed at Plywood Pictures in Brooklyn, New York, studio personnel wore black clothing and moved the cats with gloves to successfully pantomime. They also created custom instruments and props to match the cats' sizes. After release, Mahaffey stated to Entertainment Weekly that the video's focus on cats was strategized to go viral.

== Reception ==
Bob Boilen and Stephen Thompson of NPR denounced the lyrics of "Runaway" as trivial but praised its instrumental, calling it an "infectious pop-rock track". Patrick Rodgers of Nashville Scene similarly complimented "Runaway", calling it "bleeping, blooping, [and] characteristically catchy". Lyndsey Parker of Rolling Stone described the song as a memorable comeback, likening its music video to Keyboard Cat and ranking it at number 10 on a list of the top 20 music videos of 2014. Gerald Dih of AudioPhix lauded its dance energy and improved production from Self's earlier discography, highlighting its "punchy, retro, radio-friendly" style. On July 29, 2014, "Runaway" was featured as the iTunes Single of the Week.

== Personnel ==
Credits adapted from the EP's liner notes.

- Matt Mahaffey – lead vocals, instruments, production, audio mixing, arrangement
- Mark Chalecki – mastering engineer

Sample credits

- "Runaway" contains samples of "Do That Stuff", written by George Clinton, Gary Shider, and Bernie Worrell, as performed by Parliament.
