= List of number-one songs of 2019 (Mexico) =

This is a list of the number-one songs of 2019 in Mexico. The airplay chart rankings are published by Monitor Latino, based on airplay across radio stations in Mexico using the Radio Tracking Data, LLC in real time. Charts are compiled from Monday to Sunday.

The streaming charts are published by AMPROFON (Asociación Mexicana de Productores de Fonogramas y Videogramas).

== Chart history (airplay) ==
Besides the General chart, Monitor Latino publishes "Pop", "Popular" (Regional Mexican music) and "Anglo" charts. Monitor Latino provides two lists for each of these charts: the "Audience" list ranked the songs according to the estimated number of people that listened to them on the radio during the week. The "Tocadas" (Spins) list ranked the songs according to the number of times they were played on the radio during the week.

=== General ===
The yellow background indicates the best-performing General song of 2019.

Issue date	Song (Audience)	Song (Spins)	Ref.
6 January	"Made for Now"^{Janet Jackson with Daddy Yankee}	"Con todo incluido"^{La Adictiva}	
13 January	"Made for Now"^{Janet Jackson with Daddy Yankee}	"¿Por qué cambiaste de opinión?"^{Calibre 50}	
20 January	"No he logrado aprender"^{La Arrolladora Banda El Limón}	"¿Por qué cambiaste de opinión?"^{Calibre 50}	
27 January	"Mala mía"^{Maluma with Anitta & Becky G}	"¿Por qué cambiaste de opinión?"^{Calibre 50}	
3 February	"Mala mía"^{Maluma with Anitta & Becky G}	"¿Por qué cambiaste de opinión?"^{Calibre 50}	
10 February	"No he logrado aprender"^{La Arrolladora Banda El Limón}	"¿Por qué cambiaste de opinión?"^{Calibre 50}	
17 February	"¿Por qué cambiaste de opinión?"^{Calibre 50}	"¿Por qué cambiaste de opinión?"^{Calibre 50}	
24 February	"La plata"^{Juanes featuring Lalo Ebratt}	"¿Por qué cambiaste de opinión?"^{Calibre 50}	
3 March	"La plata"^{Juanes featuring Lalo Ebratt}	"A través del vaso"^{Banda Los Sebastianes}	
10 March	"La plata"^{Juanes featuring Lalo Ebratt}	"A través del vaso"^{Banda Los Sebastianes}	
17 March	"Te confieso"^{Camila}	"A través del vaso"^{Banda Los Sebastianes}	
24 March	"Reggaeton"^{J Balvin}	"Nada Nuevo"^{Christian Nodal}	
31 March	"Pa' mala yo"^{Natti Natasha}	"Pa' mala yo"^{Natti Natasha}	
7 April	"HP"^{Maluma}	"Con calma"^{Daddy Yankee featuring Snow}	
14 April	"Con calma"^{Daddy Yankee featuring Snow}	"Con calma"^{Daddy Yankee featuring Snow}	
21 April	"Con calma"^{Daddy Yankee featuring Snow}	"Con calma"^{Daddy Yankee featuring Snow}	
28 April	"Con calma"^{Daddy Yankee featuring Snow}	"Con calma"^{Daddy Yankee featuring Snow}	
5 May	"Con calma"^{Daddy Yankee featuring Snow}	"Con calma"^{Daddy Yankee featuring Snow}	
12 May	"Con calma"^{Daddy Yankee featuring Snow}	"Con calma"^{Daddy Yankee featuring Snow}	
19 May	"Con calma"^{Daddy Yankee featuring Snow}	"Con calma"^{Daddy Yankee featuring Snow}	
26 May	"Duele"^{Reik with Wisin & Yandel}	"Mi soledad"^{Los Plebes del Rancho de Ariel Camacho}	
2 June	"I Don't Care"^{Ed Sheeran with Justin Bieber}	"Mi soledad"^{Los Plebes del Rancho de Ariel Camacho}	
9 June	"Con altura"^{Rosalía with El Guincho & J Balvin}	"Mi soledad"^{Los Plebes del Rancho de Ariel Camacho}	
16 June	"Con altura"^{Rosalía with El Guincho & J Balvin}	"Simplemente gracias"^{Calibre 50}	
23 June	"Con altura"^{Rosalía with El Guincho & J Balvin}	"Simplemente gracias"^{Calibre 50}	
30 June	"Con altura"^{Rosalía with El Guincho & J Balvin}	"Simplemente gracias"^{Calibre 50}	
7 July	"11 PM"^{Maluma}	"El amor de mi vida"^{La Adictiva}	
14 July	"Amor a primera vista"^{Los Ángeles Azules featuring Horacio Palencia, Belinda & Lalo Ebratt}	"De los besos que te di"^{Christian Nodal}	
21 July	"Amor a primera vista"^{Los Ángeles Azules featuring Horacio Palencia, Belinda & Lalo Ebratt}	"De los besos que te di"^{Christian Nodal}	
28 July	"Amor a primera vista"^{Los Ángeles Azules featuring Horacio Palencia, Belinda & Lalo Ebratt}	"Amor a primera vista"^{Los Ángeles Azules featuring Horacio Palencia, Belinda & Lalo Ebratt}	
4 August	"Amor a primera vista"^{Los Ángeles Azules featuring Horacio Palencia, Belinda & Lalo Ebratt}	"Amor a primera vista"^{Los Ángeles Azules featuring Horacio Palencia, Belinda & Lalo Ebratt}	
11 August	"Amor a primera vista"^{Los Ángeles Azules featuring Horacio Palencia, Belinda & Lalo Ebratt}	"Amor a primera vista"^{Los Ángeles Azules featuring Horacio Palencia, Belinda & Lalo Ebratt}	
18 August	"Amor a primera vista"^{Los Ángeles Azules featuring Horacio Palencia, Belinda & Lalo Ebratt}	"Amor a primera vista"^{Los Ángeles Azules featuring Horacio Palencia, Belinda & Lalo Ebratt}	
25 August	"Amor a primera vista"^{Los Ángeles Azules featuring Horacio Palencia, Belinda & Lalo Ebratt}	"Amor a primera vista"^{Los Ángeles Azules featuring Horacio Palencia, Belinda & Lalo Ebratt}	
1 September	"Amor a primera vista"^{Los Ángeles Azules featuring Horacio Palencia, Belinda & Lalo Ebratt}	"Amor a primera vista"^{Los Ángeles Azules featuring Horacio Palencia, Belinda & Lalo Ebratt}	
8 September	"Amor a primera vista"^{Los Ángeles Azules featuring Horacio Palencia, Belinda & Lalo Ebratt}	"Amor a primera vista"^{Los Ángeles Azules featuring Horacio Palencia, Belinda & Lalo Ebratt}	
15 September	"Amor a primera vista"^{Los Ángeles Azules featuring Horacio Palencia, Belinda & Lalo Ebratt}	"Amor a primera vista"^{Los Ángeles Azules featuring Horacio Palencia, Belinda & Lalo Ebratt}	
22 September	"Amor a primera vista"^{Los Ángeles Azules featuring Horacio Palencia, Belinda & Lalo Ebratt}	"Amor a primera vista"^{Los Ángeles Azules featuring Horacio Palencia, Belinda & Lalo Ebratt}	
29 September	"Indeciso"^{Reik with J Balvin and Lalo Ebratt}	"Tres botellas"^{Los Plebes del Rancho de Ariel Camacho}	
6 October	"China"^{Anuel AA, Daddy Yankee, and Karol G featuring Ozuna and J Balvin}	"Tres botellas"^{Los Plebes del Rancho de Ariel Camacho}	
13 October	"China"^{Anuel AA, Daddy Yankee, and Karol G featuring Ozuna and J Balvin}	"Tres botellas"^{Los Plebes del Rancho de Ariel Camacho}	
20 October	"No Se Me Quita"^{Maluma featuring Ricky Martin}	"Tres botellas"^{Los Plebes del Rancho de Ariel Camacho}	
27 October	"La Canción"^{J Balvin and Bad Bunny}	"Como te atreves"^{Mexillenials}	
3 November	"Bonita"^{Juanes with Sebastián Yatra}	"Tres botellas"^{Los Plebes del Rancho de Ariel Camacho}	
10 November	"Tutu"^{Camilo with Shakira and Pedro Capó}	"Para no quedarte mal"^{Hijos de Barron}	
17 November	"Caballero"^{Alejandro Fernández}	"Para no quedarte mal"^{Hijos de Barron}	
24 November	"Caballero"^{Alejandro Fernández}	"Para no quedarte mal"^{Hijos de Barron}	
1 December	"Hasta que salga el sol"^{Ozuna}	"Para no quedarte mal"^{Hijos de Barron}	
8 December	"Hasta que salga el sol"^{Ozuna}	"Para no quedarte mal"^{Hijos de Barron}	
15 December	"La mejor versión de mí"^{Natti Natasha featuring Romeo Santos}	"Escondidos"^{La Adictiva}	
22 December	"Que Tire Pa Lante"^{Daddy Yankee}	"Escondidos"^{La Adictiva}	
29 December	"Caballero"^{Alejandro Fernández}	"Escondidos"^{La Adictiva}	

=== Pop ===
The blue background indicates the best-performing Pop song of 2019.

Issue date	Song (Audience)	Song (Spins)	Ref.
6 January	"Te esperé"^{Jesse & Joy}	"Desconocidos"^{Mau y Ricky with Camilo Echeverry & Manuel Turizo}	
13 January	"Te esperé"^{Jesse & Joy}	"Hoy se me olvida"^{Chucho Rivas}	
20 January	"Sería más fácil"^{Carlos Rivera}	"Hoy se me olvida"^{Chucho Rivas}	
27 January	"Sería más fácil"^{Carlos Rivera}	"Calma"^{Pedro Capó with Farruko}	
3 February	"Sería más fácil"^{Carlos Rivera}	"Calma"^{Pedro Capó with Farruko}	
10 February	"No tengo nada"^{Alejandro Sanz}	"Calma"^{Pedro Capó with Farruko}	
17 February	"Sería más fácil"^{Carlos Rivera}	"Calma"^{Pedro Capó with Farruko}	
24 February	"Te confieso"^{Camila}	"Un año"^{Sebastián Yatra with Reik}	
3 March	"Te confieso"^{Camila}	"Un año"^{Sebastián Yatra with Reik}	
10 March	"Te confieso"^{Camila}	"Un año"^{Sebastián Yatra with Reik}	
17 March	"Te confieso"^{Camila}	"Un año"^{Sebastián Yatra with Reik}	
24 March	"Te confieso"^{Camila}	"Un año"^{Sebastián Yatra with Reik}	
31 March	"Un año"^{Sebastián Yatra with Reik}	"Un año"^{Sebastián Yatra with Reik}	
7 April	"Deberías estar aquí"^{Río Roma}	"Con calma"^{Daddy Yankee featuring Snow}	
14 April	"Con calma"^{Daddy Yankee featuring Snow}	"Con calma"^{Daddy Yankee featuring Snow}	
21 April	"Deberías estar aquí"^{Río Roma}	"Con calma"^{Daddy Yankee featuring Snow}	
28 April	"Con calma"^{Daddy Yankee featuring Snow}	"Con calma"^{Daddy Yankee featuring Snow}	
5 May	"Con calma"^{Daddy Yankee featuring Snow}	"Con calma"^{Daddy Yankee featuring Snow}	
12 May	"Mi persona favorita"^{Alejandro Sanz with Camila Cabello}	"Con calma"^{Daddy Yankee featuring Snow}	
19 May	"Mi persona favorita"^{Alejandro Sanz with Camila Cabello}	"Con calma"^{Daddy Yankee featuring Snow}	
26 May	"Duele"^{Reik with Wisin & Yandel}	"Con calma"^{Daddy Yankee featuring Snow}	
2 June	"Mañana es too late"^{Jesse & Joy with J Balvin}	"Con calma"^{Daddy Yankee featuring Snow}	
9 June	"Con altura"^{Rosalía with El Guincho & J Balvin}	"Con calma"^{Daddy Yankee featuring Snow}	
16 June	"Con altura"^{Rosalía with El Guincho & J Balvin}	"Con calma"^{Daddy Yankee featuring Snow}	
23 June	"11 PM"^{Maluma}	"Mañana es too late"^{Jesse & Joy with J Balvin}	
30 June	"11 PM"^{Maluma}	"11 PM"^{Maluma}	
7 July	"11 PM"^{Maluma}	"11 PM"^{Maluma}	
14 July	"11 PM"^{Maluma}	"11 PM"^{Maluma}	
21 July	"11 PM"^{Maluma}	"Runaway"^{Sebastián Yatra with Daddy Yankee & Natti Natasha featuring Jonas Brothers}	
28 July	"Runaway"^{Sebastián Yatra with Daddy Yankee & Natti Natasha featuring Jonas Brothers}	"Runaway"^{Sebastián Yatra with Daddy Yankee & Natti Natasha featuring Jonas Brothers}	
4 August	"Runaway"^{Sebastián Yatra with Daddy Yankee & Natti Natasha featuring Jonas Brothers}	"Runaway"^{Sebastián Yatra with Daddy Yankee & Natti Natasha featuring Jonas Brothers}	
11 August	"Querer mejor"^{Juanes featuring Alessia Cara}	"Runaway"^{Sebastián Yatra with Daddy Yankee & Natti Natasha featuring Jonas Brothers}	
18 August	"Querer mejor"^{Juanes featuring Alessia Cara}	"Runaway"^{Sebastián Yatra with Daddy Yankee & Natti Natasha featuring Jonas Brothers}	
25 August	"Te esperaba"^{Carlos Rivera}	"Runaway"^{Sebastián Yatra with Daddy Yankee & Natti Natasha featuring Jonas Brothers}	
1 September	"Tutu"^{Camilo with Pedro Capó}	"Runaway"^{Sebastián Yatra with Daddy Yankee & Natti Natasha featuring Jonas Brothers}	
8 September	"Tutu"^{Camilo with Pedro Capó}	"Runaway"^{Sebastián Yatra with Daddy Yankee & Natti Natasha featuring Jonas Brothers}	
15 September	"Tutu"^{Camilo with Pedro Capó}	"Tutu"^{Camilo with Pedro Capó}	
22 September	"Tutu"^{Camilo with Pedro Capó}	"Tutu"^{Camilo with Pedro Capó}	
29 September	"Tutu"^{Camilo with Pedro Capó}	"Tutu"^{Camilo with Pedro Capó}	
6 October	"China"^{Anuel AA, Daddy Yankee, and Karol G featuring Ozuna and J Balvin}	"Tutu"^{Camilo with Pedro Capó}	
13 October	"China"^{Anuel AA, Daddy Yankee, and Karol G featuring Ozuna and J Balvin}	"Tutu"^{Camilo with Pedro Capó}	
20 October	"No Se Me Quita"^{Maluma featuring Ricky Martin}	"Tutu"^{Camilo with Shakira and Pedro Capó}	
27 October	"No Se Me Quita"^{Maluma featuring Ricky Martin}	"Tutu"^{Camilo with Shakira and Pedro Capó}	
3 November	"Tutu"^{Camilo with Shakira and Pedro Capó}	"Tutu"^{Camilo with Shakira and Pedro Capó}	
10 November	"Tutu"^{Camilo with Shakira and Pedro Capó}	"Tutu"^{Camilo with Shakira and Pedro Capó}	
17 November	"Tutu"^{Camilo with Shakira and Pedro Capó}	"Tutu"^{Camilo with Shakira and Pedro Capó}	
24 November	"Tanto"^{Jesse & Joy with Luis Fonsi}	"Tutu"^{Camilo with Shakira and Pedro Capó}	
1 December	"Tanto"^{Jesse & Joy with Luis Fonsi}	"Tutu"^{Camilo with Shakira and Pedro Capó}	
8 December	"Tanto"^{Jesse & Joy with Luis Fonsi}	"Ritmo (Bad Boys for Life)"^{The Black Eyed Peas with J Balvin}	
15 December	"Tanto"^{Jesse & Joy with Luis Fonsi}	"Tanto"^{Jesse & Joy with Luis Fonsi}	
22 December	"Tanto"^{Jesse & Joy with Luis Fonsi}	"Tusa"^{Karol G with Nicki Minaj}	
29 December	"Tanto"^{Jesse & Joy with Luis Fonsi}	"Tusa"^{Karol G with Nicki Minaj}	

=== Popular ===
The yellow background indicates the best-performing Popular song of 2019.

Issue date	Song (Audience)	Song (Spins)	Ref.
6 January	"Con todo incluido"^{La Adictiva}	"Con todo incluido"^{La Adictiva}	
13 January	"No he logrado aprender"^{La Arrolladora Banda El Limón}	"¿Por qué cambiaste de opinión?"^{Calibre 50}	
20 January	"No he logrado aprender"^{La Arrolladora Banda El Limón}	"¿Por qué cambiaste de opinión?"^{Calibre 50}	
27 January	"No he logrado aprender"^{La Arrolladora Banda El Limón}	"¿Por qué cambiaste de opinión?"^{Calibre 50}	
3 February	"No he logrado aprender"^{La Arrolladora Banda El Limón}	"¿Por qué cambiaste de opinión?"^{Calibre 50}	
10 February	"No he logrado aprender"^{La Arrolladora Banda El Limón}	"¿Por qué cambiaste de opinión?"^{Calibre 50}	
17 February	"¿Por qué cambiaste de opinión?"^{Calibre 50}	"¿Por qué cambiaste de opinión?"^{Calibre 50}	
24 February	"No he logrado aprender"^{La Arrolladora Banda El Limón}	"¿Por qué cambiaste de opinión?"^{Calibre 50}	
3 March	"A través del vaso"^{Banda Los Sebastianes}	"A través del vaso"^{Banda Los Sebastianes}	
10 March	"A través del vaso"^{Banda Los Sebastianes}	"A través del vaso"^{Banda Los Sebastianes}	
17 March	"A través del vaso"^{Banda Los Sebastianes}	"A través del vaso"^{Banda Los Sebastianes}	
24 March	"A través del vaso"^{Banda Los Sebastianes}	"Nada nuevo"^{Christian Nodal}	
31 March	"A través del vaso"^{Banda Los Sebastianes}	"Nada nuevo"^{Christian Nodal}	
7 April	"A través del vaso"^{Banda Los Sebastianes}	"Nada nuevo"^{Christian Nodal}	
14 April	"A través del vaso"^{Banda Los Sebastianes}	"Nada nuevo"^{Christian Nodal}	
21 April	"Tiene razón la lógica"^{La Arrolladora Banda El Limón featuring Espinoza Paz}	"Nada nuevo"^{Christian Nodal}	
28 April	"Mi persona preferida"^{El Bebeto}	"Nada nuevo"^{Christian Nodal}	
5 May	"Sin memoria"^{Alfredo Olivas featuring Julión Álvarez}	"Mentiras"^{Remmy Valenzuela}	
12 May	"Sin memoria"^{Alfredo Olivas featuring Julión Álvarez}	"Nada nuevo"^{Christian Nodal}	
19 May	"Mentiras"^{Remmy Valenzuela}	"Mi soledad"^{Los Plebes del Rancho de Ariel Camacho}	
26 May	"Mentiras"^{Remmy Valenzuela}	"Mi soledad"^{Los Plebes del Rancho de Ariel Camacho}	
2 June	"Tiene razón la lógica"^{La Arrolladora Banda El Limón featuring Espinoza Paz}	"Mi soledad"^{Los Plebes del Rancho de Ariel Camacho}	
9 June	"Sin memoria"^{Alfredo Olivas featuring Julión Álvarez}	"Mi soledad"^{Los Plebes del Rancho de Ariel Camacho}	
16 June	"Sin memoria"^{Alfredo Olivas featuring Julión Álvarez}	"Simplemente gracias"^{Calibre 50}	
23 June	"Sin memoria"^{Alfredo Olivas featuring Julión Álvarez}	"Simplemente gracias"^{Calibre 50}	
30 June	"Sin memoria"^{Alfredo Olivas featuring Julión Álvarez}	"Simplemente gracias"^{Calibre 50}	
7 July	"Sin memoria"^{Alfredo Olivas featuring Julión Álvarez}	"El amor de mi vida"^{La adictiva}	
14 July	"De los besos que te di"^{Christian Nodal}	"De los besos que te di"^{Christian Nodal}	
21 July	"Mejor recuerda"^{Cristian Jacobo}	"De los besos que te di"^{Christian Nodal}	
28 July	"Mejor recuerda"^{Cristian Jacobo}	"De los besos que te di"^{Christian Nodal}	
4 August	"Cedí"^{La Arrolladora Banda El Limón}	"De los besos que te di"^{Christian Nodal}	
11 August	"Cedí"^{La Arrolladora Banda El Limón}	"De los besos que te di"^{Christian Nodal}	
18 August	"Cedí"^{La Arrolladora Banda El Limón}	"De los besos que te di"^{Christian Nodal}	
25 August	"Cedí"^{La Arrolladora Banda El Limón}	"De los besos que te di"^{Christian Nodal}	
1 September	"Cedí"^{La Arrolladora Banda El Limón}	"De los besos que te di"^{Christian Nodal}	
8 September	"Cedí"^{La Arrolladora Banda El Limón}	"El circo"^{El Fantasma}	
15 September	"Cedí"^{La Arrolladora Banda El Limón}	"No me enseñaste"^{Jary Franco}	
22 September	"Cedí"^{La Arrolladora Banda El Limón}	"No me enseñaste"^{Jary Franco}	
29 September	"No elegí conocerte"^{Banda MS}	"Tres botellas"^{Los Plebes del Rancho de Ariel Camacho}	
6 October	"El sillón"^{Alfredo Olivas}	"Tres botellas"^{Los Plebes del Rancho de Ariel Camacho}	
13 October	"El sillón"^{Alfredo Olivas}	"Tres botellas"^{Los Plebes del Rancho de Ariel Camacho}	
20 October	"El sillón"^{Alfredo Olivas}	"Tres botellas"^{Los Plebes del Rancho de Ariel Camacho}	
27 October	"El sillón"^{Alfredo Olivas}	"Como te atreves"^{Mexillenials}	
3 November	"El sillón"^{Alfredo Olivas}	"Tres botellas"^{Los Plebes del Rancho de Ariel Camacho}	
10 November	"El sillón"^{Alfredo Olivas}	"Para no quedarte mal"^{Hijos de Barron}	
17 November	"Mia desde siempre"^{La Arrolladora Banda El Limón}	"Para no quedarte mal"^{Hijos de Barron}	
24 November	"Mia desde siempre"^{La Arrolladora Banda El Limón}	"Para no quedarte mal"^{Hijos de Barron}	
1 December	"Mia desde siempre"^{La Arrolladora Banda El Limón}	"Para no quedarte mal"^{Hijos de Barron}	
8 December	"Mia desde siempre"^{La Arrolladora Banda El Limón}	"Para no quedarte mal"^{Hijos de Barron}	
15 December	"Mia desde siempre"^{La Arrolladora Banda El Limón}	"Escondidos"^{La Adictiva}	
22 December	"Escondidos"^{La Adictiva}	"Escondidos"^{La Adictiva}	
29 December	"Escondidos"^{La Adictiva}	"Escondidos"^{La Adictiva}	

=== Anglo ===
The green background indicates the best-performing Anglo song of 2019.

Issue date	Song (Audience)	Song (Spins)	Ref.
6 January	"Made for Now"^{Janet Jackson with Daddy Yankee}	"Made for Now"^{Janet Jackson with Daddy Yankee}	
13 January	"Made for Now"^{Janet Jackson with Daddy Yankee}	"Made for Now"^{Janet Jackson with Daddy Yankee}	
20 January	"Made for Now"^{Janet Jackson with Daddy Yankee}	"Made for Now"^{Janet Jackson with Daddy Yankee}	
27 January	"Thank U, Next"^{Ariana Grande}	"Made for Now"^{Janet Jackson with Daddy Yankee}	
3 February	"Sunflower"^{Post Malone}	"Made for Now"^{Janet Jackson with Daddy Yankee}	
10 February	"Sunflower"^{Post Malone}	"Sunflower"^{Post Malone}	
17 February	"Sunflower"^{Post Malone}	"Sunflower"^{Post Malone}	
24 February	"Dancing with a Stranger"^{Sam Smith with Normani}	"Sunflower"^{Post Malone}	
3 March	"Dancing with a Stranger"^{Sam Smith with Normani}	"Dancing with a Stranger"^{Sam Smith with Normani}	
10 March	"Dancing with a Stranger"^{Sam Smith with Normani}	"Dancing with a Stranger"^{Sam Smith with Normani}	
17 March	"Dancing with a Stranger"^{Sam Smith with Normani}	"Dancing with a Stranger"^{Sam Smith with Normani}	
24 March	"Dancing with a Stranger"^{Sam Smith with Normani}	"Dancing with a Stranger"^{Sam Smith with Normani}	
31 March	"Dancing with a Stranger"^{Sam Smith with Normani}	"Dancing with a Stranger"^{Sam Smith with Normani}	
7 April	"Dancing with a Stranger"^{Sam Smith with Normani}	"Dancing with a Stranger"^{Sam Smith with Normani}	
14 April	"Dancing with a Stranger"^{Sam Smith with Normani}	"Dancing with a Stranger"^{Sam Smith with Normani}	
21 April	"Boy with Luv"^{BTS featuring Halsey}	"Dancing with a Stranger"^{Sam Smith with Normani}	
28 April	"Boy with Luv"^{BTS featuring Halsey}	"Dancing with a Stranger"^{Sam Smith with Normani}	
5 May	"Boy with Luv"^{BTS featuring Halsey}	"Dancing with a Stranger"^{Sam Smith with Normani}	
12 May	"Boy with Luv"^{BTS featuring Halsey}	"Me"^{Taylor Swift featuring Brendon Urie}	
19 May	"Me"^{Taylor Swift featuring Brendon Urie}	"Me"^{Taylor Swift featuring Brendon Urie}	
26 May	"Me"^{Taylor Swift featuring Brendon Urie}	"Me"^{Taylor Swift featuring Brendon Urie}	
2 June	"I Don't Care"^{Ed Sheeran with Justin Bieber}	"I Don't Care"^{Ed Sheeran with Justin Bieber}	
9 June	"I Don't Care"^{Ed Sheeran with Justin Bieber}	"I Don't Care"^{Ed Sheeran with Justin Bieber}	
16 June	"I Don't Care"^{Ed Sheeran with Justin Bieber}	"I Don't Care"^{Ed Sheeran with Justin Bieber}	
23 June	"I Don't Care"^{Ed Sheeran with Justin Bieber}	"I Don't Care"^{Ed Sheeran with Justin Bieber}	
30 June	"I Don't Care"^{Ed Sheeran with Justin Bieber}	"I Don't Care"^{Ed Sheeran with Justin Bieber}	
7 July	"I Don't Care"^{Ed Sheeran with Justin Bieber}	"I Don't Care"^{Ed Sheeran with Justin Bieber}	
14 July	"I Don't Care"^{Ed Sheeran with Justin Bieber}	"I Don't Care"^{Ed Sheeran with Justin Bieber}	
21 July	"Señorita"^{Shawn Mendes with Camila Cabello}	"Señorita"^{Shawn Mendes with Camila Cabello}	
28 July	"Señorita"^{Shawn Mendes with Camila Cabello}	"Señorita"^{Shawn Mendes with Camila Cabello}	
4 August	"Señorita"^{Shawn Mendes with Camila Cabello}	"Señorita"^{Shawn Mendes with Camila Cabello}	
11 August	"Señorita"^{Shawn Mendes with Camila Cabello}	"Señorita"^{Shawn Mendes with Camila Cabello}	
18 August	"Señorita"^{Shawn Mendes with Camila Cabello}	"Señorita"^{Shawn Mendes with Camila Cabello}	
25 August	"Señorita"^{Shawn Mendes with Camila Cabello}	"Señorita"^{Shawn Mendes with Camila Cabello}	
1 September	"Señorita"^{Shawn Mendes with Camila Cabello}	"Señorita"^{Shawn Mendes with Camila Cabello}	
8 September	"Señorita"^{Shawn Mendes with Camila Cabello}	"Señorita"^{Shawn Mendes with Camila Cabello}	
15 September	"Señorita"^{Shawn Mendes with Camila Cabello}	"Señorita"^{Shawn Mendes with Camila Cabello}	
22 September	"Señorita"^{Shawn Mendes with Camila Cabello}	"Señorita"^{Shawn Mendes with Camila Cabello}	
29 September	"Señorita"^{Shawn Mendes with Camila Cabello}	"Señorita"^{Shawn Mendes with Camila Cabello}	
6 October	"Señorita"^{Shawn Mendes with Camila Cabello}	"Señorita"^{Shawn Mendes with Camila Cabello}	
13 October	"Piece of Your Heart"^{Meduza featuring Goodboys}	"Señorita"^{Shawn Mendes with Camila Cabello}	
20 October	"Piece of Your Heart"^{Meduza featuring Goodboys}	"Señorita"^{Shawn Mendes with Camila Cabello}	
27 October	"Dance Monkey"^{Tones and I}	"Dance Monkey^{Tones and I}	
3 November	"Dance Monkey"^{Tones and I}	"Dance Monkey^{Tones and I}	
10 November	"Dance Monkey"^{Tones and I}	"Dance Monkey^{Tones and I}	
17 November	"Dance Monkey"^{Tones and I}	"Dance Monkey^{Tones and I}	
24 November	"Dance Monkey"^{Tones and I}	"Dance Monkey^{Tones and I}	
1 December	"Dance Monkey"^{Tones and I}	"Dance Monkey^{Tones and I}	
8 December	"Dance Monkey"^{Tones and I}	"Dance Monkey^{Tones and I}	
15 December	"Dance Monkey"^{Tones and I}	"Dance Monkey^{Tones and I}	
22 December	"Dance Monkey"^{Tones and I}	"Dance Monkey^{Tones and I}	
29 December	"Dance Monkey"^{Tones and I}	"Dance Monkey^{Tones and I}	

== See also ==
- List of number-one albums of 2019 (Mexico)
