= Happy Up Here =

Single by Röyksopp

from the album Junior
- Released: 19 January 2009
- Recorded: 2008
- Genre: Electronica, dub, house
- Length: 2:44
- Label: Astralwerks, Wall of Sound
- Songwriters: George Clinton, Jr; Garry M. Shider; Bernard B. Worrell; Röyksopp
- Producer: Röyksopp

Röyksopp singles chronology
"Beautiful Day Without You" (2006)	"Happy Up Here" (2009)	"The Girl and the Robot" (2009)

Music video
- "Happy Up Here" on YouTube

"Happy Up Here" is a song by Norwegian electronic music duo Röyksopp, released as a free download from their album Junior. The one-track digital single was also released in selected stores on 19 January 2009, while the physical single and digital EP with remixes were released on 16 March 2009. The song sampled Parliament's 1976 single, "Do That Stuff".

== Track listings ==
=== 12" vinyl ===
1. "Happy Up Here" (Boys Noize Remix) – 5:33
2. "Happy Up Here" – 2:44
3. "Happy Up Here" (Breakbot Remix) – 2:55
4. "Happy Up Here" (Datassette Remix) – 5:28

=== 7" vinyl ===
1. "Happy Up Here" (Holy Fuck Remix) – 03:43
2. "Happy Up Here" – 2:44

== Music video ==
The music video, directed by Reuben Sutherland, was released online on 25 February 2009 via the band's official website, as well as on their official YouTube channel. It features panning shots of a cityscape, with floating boxes lit up by light bulbs. It is eventually made apparent that the boxes are a 3D version of the aliens featured in the old arcade classic Space Invaders and the video is subsequently played out like the game, with cars on the ground serving as the defence. The video ends when the remaining aliens retreat.

== Charts ==
Weekly chart performance for "Happy Up Here"
Chart (2009)	Peak position
Belgium (Ultratip Bubbling Under Flanders)	4
CIS Airplay (TopHit)	166
France (SNEP)	73
Norway (VG-lista)	3
UK Singles (OCC)	44

Annual chart rankings for "Happy Up Here"
Chart (2009)	Rank
Japan Adult Contemporary (Billboard)	100
