= La Respuesta =

2019 single by Becky G and Maluma

Single by Becky G and Maluma
- Language: Spanish
- English title: "The Answer"
- Released: April 19, 2019
- Recorded: May 2018
- Genre: Reggaeton
- Length: 3:02
- Label: Kemosabe
- Songwriters: Rebbeca Gomez; Juan Londoño; Édgar Barrera
- Producer: Édgar Barrera

Becky G singles chronology
"Banana" (2019)	"La Respuesta" (2019)	"Next to You" (2019)

Maluma singles chronology
"Medellín" (2019)	"La Respuesta" (2019)	"11 PM" (2019)

Music video
- "La Respuesta" on YouTube

"La Respuesta" is a song by American singer Becky G and Colombian singer Maluma. It was released by Kemosabe Records on April 19, 2019. The track was written by Gomez, Maluma and its producer Édgar Barrera, and was co-produced by Luis Barrera Jr. and Daniel Buitrago. It is a reggaeton song about female empowerment and breaking gender stereotypes. The accompanying music video was directed by Daniel Duran.

== Background ==
Gomez stated that the song is "about breaking free from stereotypes", and she hopes that it "serves to empower young women". It is Gomez and Maluma's second collaboration, following the remix of "Mala Mía" released in 2018. It was characterized as a "power anthem about breaking stereotypes". The track was originally recorded in May 2018.

== In other media ==
The song was going to be on the main tracklist of Just Dance 2020, but was removed for an unknown reason. It was later brought back on Just Dance Unlimited.

== Music video ==
The music video was released alongside the song on April 19. It was called "retro-inspired" with "cute costumes" and "vibrant set-pieces" by Idolator; its setting is inspired by the 1950s. As of November 2023, the clip has over 454 million views.

The video starts in black-and-white, with Gomez in her room, watching a commercial featuring Maluma promoting a soap powder called "Sun Soap", saying "Si quieres una experiencia con espuma, llama al 1-800-Maluma" ("If you want an experience with foam, call at 1-800-Maluma"). She then goes around the neighborhood greeting people and helping a man by fixing his car. Maluma is shown singing his first verse while washing clothes in an old-fashioned way. These scenes are spliced with those of Gomez doing choreography with back-up dancers, as well as her and Maluma singing in a blue setting.

== Accolades ==
Awards and nominations for "La Respuesta"
Organization	Year	Category	Result	Ref.
Latin American Music Awards	2019	Favorite Video	Nominated	
Premios Juventud	2019	Sick Dance Routine	Nominated	
Premios Quiero	2019	Best Female Video Artist	Nominated	

== Charts ==
Chart (2019)	Peak position
Argentina (Argentina Hot 100)	24
Ecuador (National-Report)	10
Hungary (Single Top 40)	7
Mexico (Mexico Español Airplay)	20
Romania (Airplay 100)	71
Spain (PROMUSICAE)	29
US Hot Latin Songs (Billboard)	13
Venezuela (National-Report)	38

== Certifications ==
Region	Certification	Certified units/sales
Brazil (Pro-Música Brasil)	3× Platinum	120,000^{‡}
Mexico (AMPROFON)	Platinum+Gold	90,000^{‡}
Spain (Promusicae)	Platinum	60,000^{‡}
^{‡} Sales+streaming figures based on certification alone.
