= This Must Be It =

Single by Röyksopp

from the album Junior
- Released: 2 November 2009
- Genre: Electronica; electropop
- Length: 4:41 (album version); 3:15 (radio edit)
- Label: Astralwerks; Wall of Sound
- Songwriter: Röyksopp
- Producer: Röyksopp

Röyksopp singles chronology
"The Girl and the Robot" (2009)	"This Must Be It" (2009)	"The Drug" (2010)

Music video
- "This Must Be It" on YouTube

"This Must Be It" is the third single from the Norwegian duo Röyksopp's third album Junior. It features the vocals of Karin Dreijer (Fever Ray, The Knife). The single was released on 2 November 2009 as a digital download and 12″ vinyl.

"This Must Be It" was featured on the soundtrack of the 2011 film Hall Pass.

== Music video ==
The official music video directed by Swedish directors Filip and Andreas Nilsson has been released online on 28 September 2009. The band's website describes the video as "a semi-biblical story that takes place in an all nude utopic hippy-world."

== Track listing ==
=== Remixes ===
1. "This Must Be It" (This Could Be Thin White Duke Remix) – 7:01
2. "This Must Be It" (Apparat Remix) – 5:58
3. "This Must Be It" (Rex The Dog's K-Dart Remix) – 7:27
4. "This Must Be It" (T.B.S. Remix) – 3:40
5. "This Must Be It" (Maxime Dangles Remix) – 8:09
6. "This Must Be It" (Moguai Remix) – 7:36
7. "This Must Be It" (Danton Eeprom Remix) – 5:21
8. "This Must Be It" (Pete Herbert Remix) – 5:54
9. "This Must Be It" (LehtMoJoe Remix) – 4:29
10. "This Must Be It" (Florian Meindl Remix) – 7:08
