= Do That Stuff =

Single by Parliament

from the album The Clones of Dr. Funkenstein
- B-side: "Handcuffs"
- Released: October 1976
- Genre: Funk
- Length: 4:47 (album version)
- Label: Casablanca; 871
- Songwriter(s): George Clinton; Gary Shider; Bernie Worrell
- Producer(s): George Clinton

"Do That Stuff" is a song by the funk band Parliament. It was the first single released from their 1976 album The Clones of Dr. Funkenstein. It peaked at number 22 on the U.S. R&B chart.

== Sampling ==
- Hip-hop duo Nice & Smooth sampled a part of the song in their song "Funky for You" off their 1989 album Nice and Smooth.
- Russian electropop band Diskoteka Avariya sampled a part of the song in their track "Рэп для моей девчонки" ("Rjep dlja moej devchonki", Rap for my chick) off their debut album "Танцуй со мной" ("Tancuj so mnoj", Dance with Me) in 1997.
- Actress and R&B singer Tatyana Ali sampled part of the song in her song "Getting Closer", from the soundtrack to the 1999 film Wild Wild West.
- Berlin-based duo Stereo Total sampled a part of the song in their song "Beauty Case" off their 1999 album My Melody.
- Electronic duo Röyksopp sampled a part of the song in their single, "Happy Up Here", off their 2009 album Junior.
- Alternative rock band sElf sampled a part of the song in their single "Runaway", off their 2014 EP Super Fake Nice.
