= John McMullen (broadcaster) =

American broadcaster

John McMullen is a radio host, producer, and broadcaster. He has worked for Internet radio broadcasters, founded the GayBC Radio Network, a service for the LGBT community, and operated Sirius Satellite Radio's LGBT radio offering, Sirius OutQ.

== Career ==
McMullen produced content for RealNetworks, later hosting a radio talk show with co-host Chelle Milleur called Hangin' Out. The show, consisting both of dialogue between the hosts and of interviews with newsmakers, covered topics of interest to the gay community in areas such as politics, world events, sports, fashion, and the arts. Issues like the Defense of Marriage Act (DOMA) and the Employment Non-Discrimination Act (ENDA) were routinely covered, as were events important to the community, such as the annual Gay and Lesbian American Music Awards. It debuted September 29, 1996.

Later, McMullen started GLOradio, which became the GayBC Radio Network, an Internet radio broadcaster. This provided an international audience with 24-hour live and prerecorded programming, including news, talk, music, and entertainment programming via streaming audio. He assembled a collection of on-air talent that included Milleur, Michelangelo Signorile, Grethe Cammermeyer, Mike Webb, Jeff Calley, Romaine Patterson, Anthony Veneziano, Jeremy Hovies, Charlie Dyer, and McMullen himself. Following the collapse of GayBC's advertising-supported business model, McMullen started another similar service called Gay Radio Network, which met a similar fate.

Fledgling satellite radio broadcaster Sirius Satellite Radio hired McMullen to direct and oversee operations for Sirius OutQ, the company's radio channel focused on the LGBT community. McMullen and many of the others from GayBC Radio and Gay Radio Network formed the initial core of Sirius OutQ's programming. From 2003 through 2006, while still with Sirius, he served as a national media endorsement spokesperson for Subaru of America. He was dismissed by Sirius in 2006.

He now serves as Director of News, Talk & Sports Programming for and hosts a general-interest talk show on KNews Radio's AM radio stations in Coachella (KNWZ 970), Palm Springs (KNWQ 1140), and Yucca Valley, California (KNWH 1250), as well as on-line. Two associates from GayBC, Charlie Dyer and Michael Wengert, also work for the station.

== Recognition ==
- In 2003, OUT magazine named McMullen one of their Out 100 for his role in launching Sirius OutQ
- Recipient of the GLAAD Media Award
- Recipient of the New York Festival's Bronze Medal for news.

== Media appearances ==
McMullen has appeared or been featured on:

- ABC World News Tonight
- CNBC's Bullseye
- CNN
- CBS News on Logo
- The Wall Street Journal
- The New York Times
- Newsweek
- Time
- The Advocate
- The Associated Press
