= Mike Webb (radio host) =

American radio host (1955–2007)

- Born: November 4, 1955; San Francisco, California
- Died: April 14, 2007 (aged 51); Queen Anne, Seattle, Washington
- Cause of death: killed with an axe
- Body discovered: June 28, 2007
- Occupation: Radio personality

Mike Webb (September 4, 1955–April 14, 2007) was an American radio personality. Originally a radio news reporter, he later became a liberal talk show host and activist. Webb was murdered in 2007.

== Early life and career in San Francisco ==
Webb was born and raised in San Francisco, California. He had an early interest in radio. As a teenager, he was a street reporter broadcasting observations of civil rights, anti-Vietnam war protests, and youth issues for San Francisco radio stations KMPX, KQED and KCBS. KMPX was the nation's first progressive rock station, started by Top 40 disc jockey Tom Donahue, and practiced advocacy journalism.

One of Webb's most notable on-air experiences was reporting the murders of San Francisco City Supervisor Harvey Milk and Mayor George Moscone by ex-City Supervisor Dan White. Working at KGO, just blocks away from the City Hall tragedy, Webb climbed to the station's rooftop, giving live reports of a city in great shock and grief. Later, when a jury found White guilty of voluntary manslaughter rather than first-degree murder, outraged citizens took over City Hall, bashed in the doors, overturned police cars and started fires in what came to be known as the White Night Riots. Reporters from every major television network joined Webb on the same rooftop reporting all the activity.

During 1973, Mike worked with Steve Newman of KCBS-FM to open San Francisco's The EndUp. The EndUp was a popular gay dance club (still open in 2013). Mike's contributions enabled the EndUp to become "the spot to be at" in the mid '70s. Mike's radio eventually over-took his club work.

Webb went on to other Bay Area radio stations, working as an on-air personality for KIOI, KFRC and KSFX.

== Career in Seattle ==
In the 1980s, Webb moved to Seattle and hosted shows at KPLZ, KEZX, and KZOK. He served intermittent terms as program director of KVI between 1984 & 1991, and KIXI until 1994.

Webb was best known for his work at KIRO, where he started in 1996. Webb was also an activist, lobbying for hate crimes legislation and Senator Ted Kennedy's Employment Non-Discrimination Act (ENDA). In the late 1990s, Webb worked for John McMullen on his Internet radio project, GayBC Radio Network. On GayBC, Webb hosted a talk show, but also handled live broadcasts of breaking news events such as gay pride events and the protest activity surrounding the World Trade Organization's 1999 Ministerial Conference in Seattle.

Outside of his radio show, Webb produced audio and did voiceover work on documentaries, industrial videos, Internet and commercial work at his studio.

Webb remembered his interviews with attorney Gerry Spence, documentary filmmaker Michael Moore, Norman Solomon, United Nations Weapons Inspector Scott Ritter, and Serving in Silence author Grethe Cammermeyer as among his favorites.

Webb was fired from KIRO in December 2005 after he was charged with making a fraudulent insurance claim after an automobile accident the previous June, when his Lexus was struck by an uninsured driver. He was found guilty in February 2007, fined, and sentenced to perform community service.

== Murder ==
Without explanation, Webb ceased producing his webcast talk show, with the last show being recorded on April 13, 2007. Subsequently, he was reported missing by his sister, who stated she had not talked to him since April 13. Webb's sister told Seattle's KOMO 4 News that she thought he might be in danger.

On June 28, 2007, the Seattle Police Department reported that a decomposed body had been found at Webb's Queen Anne home. Discovered by the property manager, the body was located in a crawl space underneath a blue plastic tarp and several storage boxes.

Following identification on June 29, the body was confirmed to be that of Mike Webb. The King County Medical Examiner's Office further determined Webb's death to be a homicide due to stabbing ("multiple sharp force trauma"). On July 19, 2007, it was announced that Scott White was arrested for the murder. According to Seattle police, White allegedly killed Webb with an axe as he slept. White pleaded guilty to second degree murder and was sentenced to 20 years in prison.
