= Junior (Röyksopp album) =

Studio album by Röyksopp
- Released: 18 March 2009
- Genres: Electronic pop; disco
- Length: 50:55
- Label: Wall of Sound
- Producer: Röyksopp

Röyksopp chronology
Back to Mine: Röyksopp (2007)	Junior (2009)	Senior (2010)

Singles from Junior
- 1. "Happy Up Here" Released: 19 January 2009; 2. "The Girl and the Robot" Released: 15 June 2009; 3. "This Must Be It" Released: 23 October 2009

Junior is the third studio album by Norwegian electronic music duo Röyksopp. It was released on 18 March 2009 by Wall of Sound. Prior to its official release, the album was made available for listening on the duo's website on 13 March 2009.

== Background and history ==
The album features guest vocals from Scandinavian singers Robyn, Karin Dreijer, Lykke Li and Anneli Drecker.

Junior debuted at number 21 on the UK Albums Chart, selling 10,378 copies in its first week. By September 2010, the album had sold 36,239 copies in the United Kingdom. The album's lead single, "Happy Up Here", premiered on 9 January 2009 on Pete Tong's Essential Selection on BBC Radio 1, and was officially released on 19 January. "The Girl and the Robot", which features Swedish singer Robyn, was released on 15 June 2009 as the album's second single. "This Must Be It" features Dreijer and was released on 23 October 2009 as the third single.

== Use in media ==
"It's What I Want" was included in the official soundtrack of the EA Sports video game, FIFA 10. "Röyksopp Forever" was also used in the background of the Flashforward Channel 5 promos during September 2009 and used as backing music on The X Factor 2009 in live shows. An instrumental version of "Vision One" was licensed for use in the video game LittleBigPlanet 2. "This Must Be It" was included in the soundtrack to the 2011 comedy film Hall Pass.

== Critical reception ==
Professional ratings
Aggregate scores
Source	Rating
AnyDecentMusic?	6.8/10
Metacritic	74/100
Review scores
Source	Rating
AllMusic	3.5/5 stars
The Guardian	4/5 stars
NME	6/10
The Observer	3/5 stars
Pitchfork	7.9/10
PopMatters	7/10
Slant Magazine	3/5 stars
Spin	7/10
The Times	4/5 stars
URB	4/5 stars

Junior received generally positive reviews from music critics. At Metacritic, which assigns a normalised rating out of 100 to reviews from mainstream publications, the album received an average score of 74, based on 21 reviews, which indicates "generally favorable reviews". The album was placed at number 30 on Pitchfork's Top 50 Albums of 2009, number 19 on Popjustice's The Top 33 Albums of 2009 and number 21 on Mixmag's Top 50 Albums of 2009.

== Track listing ==
All tracks are written by Svein Berge and Torbjørn Brundtland; additional writers indicated.

No.	Title	Writer(s)	Length
1.	"Happy Up Here"	George Clinton; Garry Shider; Bernard Worrell	2:44
2.	"The Girl and the Robot"	Robyn	4:28
3.	"Vision One"	Anneli Drecker; Yusuke Chiba; Shinichi Osawa	4:59
4.	"This Must Be It"	Karin Dreijer Andersson	4:41
5.	"Röyksopp Forever"	David Foster; Ted Lewis	4:59
6.	"Miss It So Much"	Lykke Li	5:01
7.	"Tricky Tricky"	Andersson	5:58
8.	"You Don't Have a Clue"	Drecker	4:31
9.	"Silver Cruiser"		4:36
10.	"True to Life"	Drecker	5:50
11.	"It's What I Want"		3:06

iTunes Store bonus track
No.	Title	Length
12.	"Across the Graveyard"	4:23

Japanese edition bonus track
No.	Title	Writer(s)	Length
12.	"Were You Ever Wanted"	Li	5:37

=== Notes ===
- "Happy Up Here" contains a sample of "Do That Stuff" by Parliament.
- "Vision One" is an English-language version of Röyksopp's remix of "Sing a Song" by Eri Nobuchika.
- "Röyksopp Forever" contains a sample of "Suites for My Lady" by Skylark.

== Personnel ==
Credits adapted from the liner notes of Junior.

- Röyksopp – production, mastering (all tracks); vocals (tracks 2, 11); string arrangements, strings (track 2); vocoded mystique (track 7); backing vocals (track 8); bass (track 10)
- Robyn – vocals (track 2)
- Anneli Drecker – backing vocals (tracks 2, 11); vocals (tracks 3, 8, 10 and "Across the Graveyard")
- Davide Rossi – string arrangements, strings (tracks 2, 5, 8, 9)
- Karin Dreijer Andersson – vocals (tracks 4, 7)
- Kato Ådland – bass (track 5)
- Lindy-Fay Hella – additional vocals (track 5)
- Lykke Li – vocals (track 6 and "Were You Ever Wanted")
- Ole Vegard Skauge – bass (track 10)
- Mike Marsh – mastering
- Stian Andersen – cover photography
- Leslie David – drawings, artwork

== Charts ==
=== Weekly charts ===
Chart (2009)	Peak position
Australian Albums (ARIA)	28
Australian Dance Albums (ARIA)	7
Austrian Albums (Ö3 Austria)	65
Belgian Albums (Ultratop Flanders)	10
Belgian Albums (Ultratop Wallonia)	43
Croatian International Albums (HDU)	16
Danish Albums (Hitlisten)	17
Dutch Albums (Album Top 100)	43
European Albums (Billboard)	18
French Albums (SNEP)	70
German Albums (Offizielle Top 100)	35
Irish Albums (IRMA)	52
Italian Albums (FIMI)	45
Japanese Albums (Oricon)	74
Norwegian Albums (VG-lista)	1
Scottish Albums (Official Charts)	32
Swedish Albums (Sverigetopplistan)	25
Swiss Albums (Schweizer Hitparade)	18
UK Albums (Official Charts)	21
UK Dance Albums (Official Charts)	2
UK Independent Albums (Official Charts)	1
US Billboard 200	126
US Top Dance Albums (Billboard)	4

=== Year-end charts ===
Chart (2009)	Position
Australian Dance Albums (ARIA)	42

== Release history ==
Region	Date	Label	Ref.
Japan	18 March 2009	EMI	
Australia	20 March 2009	EMI	
Germany	20 March 2009	EMI	
Italy	20 March 2009	EMI	
France	23 March 2009	Labels	
Norway	23 March 2009	Virgin	
United Kingdom	23 March 2009	Wall of Sound	
United States	24 March 2009	Astralwerks	
