= List of number-one albums of 2019 (Mexico) =

Top 100 Mexico is a record chart published weekly by AMPROFON (Asociación Mexicana de Productores de Fonogramas y Videogramas), a non-profit organization composed by Mexican and multinational record companies. This association tracks record sales (physical and digital) in Mexico. Since May 2013, some positions of the chart are published in the official Twitter account of AMPROFON including the number one position.

== Chart history ==
The yellow background indicates the best-performing album of 2019.

Chart date	Album	Artist	Reference(s)
3 January	Bohemian Rhapsody	Queen	
10 January	Bohemian Rhapsody	Queen	
17 January	Bohemian Rhapsody	Queen	
24 January	Bohemian Rhapsody	Queen	
31 January	Bohemian Rhapsody	Queen	
21 February	Thank U, Next	Ariana Grande	
28 February	Más Pandora Que Nunca	Pandora	
7 March	Más Pandora Que Nunca	Pandora	
14 March	Más Pandora Que Nunca	Pandora	
21 March	Ira Dei	Mägo de Oz	
28 March	Resurrección	Hombres G	
4 April	90's Pop Tour 3	Various Artists	
11 April	90's Pop Tour 3	Various Artists	
25 April	90's Pop Tour 3	Various Artists	
9 May	90's Pop Tour 3	Various Artists	
16 May	Emilio	Emilio	
23 May	Emilio	Emilio	
30 May	Se habla español	Enrique Guzmán	
6 June	Diosa de la noche	Gloria Trevi	
13 June	Happiness Begins	Jonas Brothers	
20 June	Infiernos	Panteón Rococó	
27 June	Conexión	María José	
4 July	Conexión	María José	
11 July	Perfecta	Banda Los Recoditos	
18 July	Perfecta	Banda Los Recoditos	
25 July	Como Lo Estamo' Haciendo	Adexe & Nau	
1 August	Conexión	María José	
8 August	Conexión	María José	
15 August	We Are Not Your Kind	Slipknot	
29 August	Lover	Taylor Swift	
5 September	Lover	Taylor Swift	
12 September	México de Mi Corazón	Natalia Jiménez	
19 September	México de Mi Corazón	Natalia Jiménez	
26 September	Psalmos	José Madero	
3 October	México de Mi Corazón	Natalia Jiménez	
17 October	Que Quienes Somos	CNCO	
24 October	50 Años 1968-2018 Antes Que Ustedes Nos Olviden En Vivo	Los Ángeles Negros	
7 November	Un Segundo MTV Unplugged	Café Tacvba	
14 November	Sólo me faltabas tú	Lucero	
21 November	Un Segundo MTV Unplugged	Café Tacvba	
28 November	Everyday Life	Coldplay	
5 December	Everyday Life	Coldplay	
12 December	Homenaje a la Música Tropical	Sonora Santanera	
19 December	Fine Line	Harry Styles	

== See also ==
- List of number-one songs of 2019 (Mexico)
