= The Girl and the Robot =

Single by Röyksopp

from the album Junior
- Released: 15 June 2009
- Genre: Electropop; synth-pop
- Length: 4:29
- Label: Wall of Sound
- Songwriters: Svein Berge; Torbjørn Brundtland; Robyn
- Producer: Röyksopp

Röyksopp singles chronology
"Happy Up Here" (2009)	"The Girl and the Robot" (2009)	"This Must Be It" (2009)

Robyn singles chronology
"Who's That Girl" (2008)	"The Girl and the Robot" (2009)	"Dancing on My Own" (2010)

Music video
- "The Girl and the Robot" on YouTube

"The Girl and the Robot" is a song by Norwegian electronic duo Röyksopp from their third studio album, Junior (2009). The song features vocals from Swedish singer Robyn and was released on 15 June 2009 as the album's second single, with remixes from Kris Menace, Chateau Marmont and Spencer & Hill.

== Critical reception ==
The song has been highly praised by critics and it has been often pointed out as one of the highlights of the album. "The Girl and the Robot" was named "Song of the Day" by Popjustice before the album was released, with reviewer calling it "a demented, choral, electronic masterpiece" and "brilliantly obsessive, bunnyboiling extravaganza." BBC Music labelled it "album-stealer", The Guardian called it "tremendous", Pitchfork Media wrote it is "a frigid, winding bit of electro that combines a powerhouse vocal with some slippery chord changes and one of the biggest choruses of 2009 so far" and Chewing Gum for The Ears noticed the track "features an excellent vocal performance by super-Swede Robyn in a techno-tinged tale of a lonely girl and her hard-working lover that's both emotional and a little goofy". The Line of Best Fit described the song as "possibly the most successful [track], ... a curious tale of an ill-fated romance between a girl and… a robot", while Resident Advisor called it "charming" and "over-the-top pop" and Edwin's Raisin declared it "a soaring, theatrical powerhouse".

The Jean Elan Remix of the track was nominated for the 2010 Grammy Award for Best Remixed Recording, Non-Classical. The song was ranked number sixty-eight on Pitchfork Media's list of The Top 100 Tracks of 2009.

== Music video ==
The official music video for the song was filmed in London on 27 April 2009. The video stars Robyn, Torbjørn Brundtland, and Svein Berge. It was released online on 21 May 2009.

== Track listing ==
=== CD single ===
1. "The Girl and the Robot" (radio edit) – 3:08
2. "The Girl and the Robot" (album version) – 4:28

=== Remixes ===
1. "The Girl and the Robot" (Kris Menace Remix) – 7:17
2. "The Girl and the Robot" (Kris Menace Re-interpretation) – 5:54
3. "The Girl and the Robot" (Spencer & Hill Remix) – 6:09
4. "The Girl and the Robot" (Spencer & Hill Instrumental) – 6:09
5. "The Girl and the Robot" (Spencer & Hill Radio Edit) – 3:25
6. "The Girl and the Robot" (Joakim Remix) – 7:19
7. "The Girl and the Robot" (Joakim Instrumental) – 7:19
8. "The Girl and the Robot" (Chateau Marmont Remix) – 4:07
9. "The Girl and the Robot" (Ocelot Remix) – 6:10
10. "The Girl and the Robot" (Jean Elan Remix) – 6:21
11. "The Girl and the Robot" (Davide Rossi Suite for a Robotic Girl Re-Interpretation) – 4:29
12. "The Girl and the Robot" (Jeremy Wheatley Edit Longer Version) – 4:30
13. "The Girl and the Robot" (Jeremy Wheatley Radio Edit) – 3:08

== Charts ==
=== Weekly charts ===
Chart (2009)	Peak position
Belgium (Ultratip Bubbling Under Flanders)	3
Belgium (Ultratip Bubbling Under Wallonia)	19
Norway (VG-lista)	2
Sweden (Sverigetopplistan)	25

=== Year-end charts ===
Chart (2009)	Position
Sweden (Sverigetopplistan)	79
