= 11 PM (song) =

Single by Maluma

from the album 11:11
- Language: Spanish
- Released: 17 May 2019
- Genre: Latin pop
- Length: 2:55
- Label: Sony Latin
- Songwriters: Juan Luis Londoño; Edgar Barrera; Carlos Isaias Morales; icente Barco; Johany Alejandro Correa; Pedro Juan De La Ossa
- Producers: Edge; Johany Correa; Pedro Juan de la Ossa Medrano

Maluma singles chronology
"La Respuesta" (2019)	"11 PM" (2019)	"Latina" (2019)

Music video
- "Maluma" on YouTube

"11 PM" is a Spanish-language song by Colombian singer Maluma, released as a single from his fourth studio album, 11:11. The song was released as the album's second single on 17 May 2019. The song peaked at number 11 on the Billboard Hot Latin Songs chart.

== Music video ==
The music video for the song was released on the same day as the song. It was directed by Nuno Gomes and has amassed over 195 million views. Maluma plays a regular guy who's seeing a rich girl. She has a boyfriend who mistreats her but her parents want her to date him because he has money. Maluma insists on spending time with her. The music video portrays how the rich girl is trying to be something she's not, in order to impress her boyfriend. However, it doesn't work and she slowly starts to lose her emotions until her heart finally breaks, but along Maluma tries to help her to restore her passion.

== Charts ==
=== Weekly charts ===
Chart (2019)	Peak position
Argentina (Argentina Hot 100)	6
Bolivia (Monitor Latino)	7
Colombia (National-Report)	2
Ecuador (Monitor Latino)	3
Ecuador Streaming (Monitor Latino)	1
Italy (FIMI)	95
Mexico (Billboard Mexican Airplay)	1
Portugal (AFP)	10
Puerto Rico (Monitor Latino)	4
Spain (Promusicae)	13
Switzerland (Schweizer Hitparade)	50
US Bubbling Under Hot 100 (Billboard)	14
US Hot Latin Songs (Billboard)	11
US Latin Airplay (Billboard)	1
US Latin Rhythm Airplay (Billboard)	1
Venezuela (Monitor Latino)	11

=== Year-end charts ===
Chart (2019)	Position
Argentina Airplay (Monitor Latino)	12
Portugal (AFP)	58

== Certifications ==
Region	Certification	Certified units/sales
Brazil (Pro-Música Brasil)	3× Platinum	120,000^{‡}
France (SNEP)	Gold	100,000^{‡}
Italy (FIMI)	Gold	35,000^{‡}
Mexico (AMPROFON)	2× Diamond+2× Platinum	720,000^{‡}
Poland (ZPAV)	Gold	10,000^{‡}
Portugal (AFP)	2× Platinum	20,000^{‡}
Spain (Promusicae)	3× Platinum	180,000^{‡}
Switzerland (IFPI Switzerland)	Gold	10,000^{‡}
United States (RIAA)	7× Platinum (Latin)	420,000^{‡}
^{‡} Sales+streaming figures based on certification alone.

== See also ==
- List of Billboard Argentina Hot 100 top-ten singles in 2019
- List of Billboard number-one Latin songs of 2019
