= 11:11 (Maluma album) =

2019 studio album by Maluma

Studio album by Maluma
- Released: 17 May 2019
- Length: 51:38
- Language: Spanish; English
- Label: Sony Latin
- Producer: Edgar Barrera "Edge"; Johany Correa "Nyal"; Pedro Juan de la Ossa Medrano "Gangsta"; Madmusick; Mambo Kingz; DJ Luian; Hydro; Tainy; Mateo Cano "Tezzel"; Sergio George; Ilya Salmanzadeh

Maluma chronology
F.A.M.E. (2018)	11:11 (2019)	Papi Juancho (2020)

Singles from 11:11
- 1. "HP" Released: 1 March 2019; 2. "11 PM" Released: 17 May 2019; 3. "Instinto Natural" Released: 9 August 2019; 4. "No Se Me Quita" Released: 30 August 2019

11:11 is the fourth studio album by the Colombian singer-songwriter Maluma, released on 17 May 2019 by Sony Music Latin. The album features guest appearances from Ricky Martin, Ozuna, Nicky Jam, Zion & Lennox, Madonna, Sech, Ty Dolla Sign, Chencho and Farina. To promote the album, Maluma went on the 11:11 World Tour in 2019. It was supported by four singles: "HP", "11 PM", "Instinto Natural", and "No Se Me Quita", and the promotional single "Déjale Saber". The album was noted by critics as being noticeably cleaner and more romantic than his previous projects.

The album debuted at number 30 on the US Billboard 200 and number 1 on the Top Latin Albums chart with first week sales of 17,000.

== Promotion ==
=== Singles ===
On 10 August 2018, the album's expected lead single, "Mala Mía," was released digitally on music stores and streaming services. A notable remix of the song featuring the American and Brazilian singers, Becky G and Anitta, was released on 21 December 2018. During the track list reveal leading up to the release of the album, it was announced that the song would not be included on the album. The song peaked at number 23 on the US Billboard Bubbling Under Hot 100 songs chart and at number nine on the US Billboard Hot Latin Songs chart.

"HP" was released digitally on music stores and streaming services on 28 February 2019 as the album's official lead single. The song peaked at number 96 on the US Billboard Hot 100 songs chart and at number eight on the US Billboard Hot Latin Songs chart.

"11 PM" was released with the album digitally on music stores and streaming services on 17 May 2019, as the album's second official single. The song peaked at number 14 on the US Billboard Bubbling Under Hot 100 songs chart and at number 11 on the US Billboard Hot Latin Songs chart.

"Instinto Natural" featuring Sech was released on 9 August 2019, as the album's third official single. It peaked at number 76 on the Billboard Argentina Hot 100.

"No Se Me Quita" was the album's fourth official single released on 30 August 2019. The song peaked at number 26 on the Billboard Argentina Hot 100, and reached number one on Mexico charts, where it was certified 4×Platinum.

=== Promotional singles ===
On 16 May 2019, Maluma released the promotional single "Déjale Saber", with a pseudo video to support, a treatment which all of the standard non-single album tracks received on the release date of 11:11.

=== Pseudo videos and other charting songs ===
On the release date of the album, similarly to the promotional single "Déjale Saber", accompanying pseudo video clips were released for all of 11:11's non-single tracks on Maluma's YouTube channel. Following the release of the album, "Dispuesto" featuring Ozuna charted at number 47 on the US Billboard Hot Latin Songs chart and at 92 on the Spanish Promusicae chart. "Soltera" featuring Madonna and "Tu Vecina" featuring Ty Dolla Sign peaked at number 7 and 13 on the US Billboard Latin Digital Song Sales chart respectively.

== Critical reception ==
Professional ratings
Aggregate scores
Source	Rating
Metacritic	77/100
Review scores
Source	Rating
AllMusic	4/5 stars
NME	4/5 stars
Rolling Stone	3.5/5 stars

In a positive review by Nick Levine from New Musical Express, in which he gave the album four out of five stars, he concluded by writing, "At 16 tracks, '11:11' is definitely a little long, but there's no denying that Maluma creates a mood that suits his persona every bit as effectively as Drake does. Stylish, sexy and right-on-trend, this album should generate some heat from Bogotá to Bognor."

== Track listing ==
11:11 track listing
No.	Title	Writer(s)	Producer(s)	Length
1.	"11 PM"	Juan Luis Londoño; Edgar Barrera; Carlos Isaias Morales; Vicente Barco; Johany Alejandro Correa; Pedro Juan De La Ossa	Edgar Barrera "Edge"; Johany Correa "Nyal"; Pedro Juan de la Ossa Medrano "Gangsta"	2:55
2.	"HP"	Londoño; Barrera; Giencarlos Rivera; Jonathan Rivera; Barco	Edge; Madmusick	3:04
3.	"No Se Me Quita" (featuring Ricky Martin)	Londoño; Barrera; Servando Primera; Andrés Castro; Oscar Hernández; Jesus Herrera	Edge	3:39
4.	"Dispuesto" (featuring Ozuna)	Londoño; Juan Carlos Ozuna; Luian Malavé Nieves; Edgar Semper Vargas; Barrera; Xavier Semper Vargas; Héctor Ramos; Kedin Maysonet	Edge; Mambo Kingz; DJ Luian; Hydro	2:42
5.	"No Puedo Olvidarte" (featuring Nicky Jam)	Londoño; Barrera; Castro; Primera; Silverio Lozada; Marco Masis; Nick Rivera Caminero	Tainy	3:11
6.	"Me Enamoré de Ti"	Londoño; Barrera; G. Rivera; J. Rivera	Edge; Madmusick	3:19
7.	"Extrañándote" (featuring Zion & Lennox)	Londoño; Barrera; G. Rivera; J. Rivera; Gabriel Pizarro; Félix G. Ortiz Torres; Jorge Alberto Erazo	Edge; Madmusick	3:45
8.	"Shhh (Calla')"	Londoño; Kevyn Mauricio Cruz; Mateo Cano; Barrera; Barco	Edge; Mateo Cano "Tezzel"	2:57
9.	"Dinero Tiene Cualquiera"	Londoño; Barrera; Rene Cano; Stiven Rojas; Morales; Barco; Pardo	Edge	3:26
10.	"Soltera" (featuring Madonna)	Madonna; Londoño; Barrera; Mike Dean; G. Rivera; J. Rivera	Edge; Madmusick	3:08
11.	"Te Quiero"	Londoño; Barrera; Sergio George; Primera	George	3:49
12.	"Instinto Natural" (featuring Sech)	Londoño; Barrera; Morales; Barco; Johany Alejandro Correa; Santiago Mesa	Edge; Nyal	3:14
13.	"Tu Vecina" (featuring Ty Dolla Sign)	Londoño; Barrera; Ilya Salmanzadeh; Savan Kotecha; Tyrone William Griffin Jr	Salmanzadeh	3:19
14.	"La Flaca" (featuring Chencho)	Londoño; Barrera; R. Cano; Rojas; M. Cano; Mesa; Chencho Corleone	Edge; Tezzel	2:40
15.	"Puesto Pa' Ti" (featuring Farina)	Farina; Londoño; Barrera; G. Rivera; Jonathan Carlo Rivera; Morales	Edge; Madmusick	3:23
16.	"Déjale Saber"	Londoño; Barrera; G. Rivera; J. C. Rivera	Edge; Madmusick	3:17
Total length:				51:38

== Charts ==
=== Weekly charts ===
Weekly chart performance for 11:11
Chart (2019)	Peak position
Austrian Albums (Ö3 Austria)	59
Canadian Albums (Billboard)	54
Belgian Albums (Ultratop Flanders)	100
Belgian Albums (Ultratop Wallonia)	49
Dutch Albums (Album Top 100)	44
French Albums (SNEP)	68
German Albums (Offizielle Top 100)	77
Italian Albums (FIMI)	20
Lithuanian Albums (AGATA)	58
Mexican Albums (AMPROFON)	9
Polish Albums (ZPAV)	27
Portuguese Albums (AFP)	13
Spanish Albums (PROMUSICAE)	6
Swiss Albums (Schweizer Hitparade)	6
US Billboard 200	30
US Top Latin Albums (Billboard)	1
US Latin Rhythm Albums (Billboard)	1
Uruguayan Albums (CUD)	18

=== Year-end charts ===
Year-end chart performance for 11:11
Chart (2019)	Position
US Top Latin Albums (Billboard)	11
Chart (2020)	Position
US Top Latin Albums (Billboard)	29
Chart (2021)	Position
US Top Latin Albums (Billboard)	79

== Certifications ==
Certifications for 11:11
Region	Certification	Certified units/sales
Brazil (Pro-Música Brasil)	Platinum	40,000^{‡}
Italy (FIMI)	Gold	25,000^{‡}
Mexico (AMPROFON)	4× Platinum+Gold	270,000^{‡}
United States (RIAA)	9× Platinum (Latin)	540,000^{‡}
^{‡} Sales+streaming figures based on certification alone.

== Release history ==
Release history and formats for 11:11
Region	Date	Formats	Label	Ref.
Various	17 May 2019	CD; digital download; streaming	Sony Latin	
