= Derek Hartley =

American talk show host (born 1969)

- Born: October 28, 1969 (age 56); Fredericksburg, Virginia, U.S.
- Education: Alhambra High School (Alhambra, California); California State University, Los Angeles
- Occupations: Talk radio; Author; Advice column
- Organizations: PlanetOut Inc.; Ali Forney Center
- Website: derekhartley.com

Derek Hartley (born October 28, 1969) is an American talk show host, who co-hosts the weekday paid subscriber-only internet radio show and podcast Derek and Romaine 2.0 and who previously served as co-host of its forerunner Derek and Romaine Show, a talk radio show that aired on SiriusXM Satellite Radio's Gay/Lesbian channel, OutQ. The show had a national audience with a potential reach of 18,000,000 listeners. The show could also be heard worldwide on the internet similar to the new show format. He serves as emcee/host of LGBT events around the country. In 2018 he was credited for writing Hurricane Bianca: From Russia with Hate.

== Early life and career ==
Hartley was born at Mary Washington Hospital in Fredericksburg, Virginia. He is the oldest of five siblings, all with different last names: Tiffany White, Adam Forgie, Alyssa Naley and Zach Millom. A military brat, he lived in several states before the age of four. He attended kindergarten in Utah and first through third grades in Sebastopol, California at Apple Blossom Elementary School.

His parents divorced and Hartley and his sister divided their time and school years between California and Utah. Between fourth and ninth grade, he attended almost a dozen different schools. He graduated from Alhambra High School in Alhambra, California in 1987 and attended the California State University at Los Angeles.

Hartley joined PlanetOut.com in May 1996 as a volunteer in the PopcornQ area on America Online. He hosted online celebrity interviews for PlanetOut on AOL in 1996 and 1997. In March 1997, he created FantasyMan Island, an online dating area for PlanetOut, which ran until January 2005, and wrote a weekly relationship advice column there. From 1997 to 1999, he also worked directly for America Online, developing entertainment content for their Entertainment Asylum area.

In December 2000, Hartley was introduced to Fred Seibert by former AOL co-worker Emil Rensing and joined Frederator in January 2001. While there, he developed online marketing campaigns for Seventeen magazine, Tiger Beat and The New TNN (later Spike TV) for Viacom.

== Derek and Romaine Show ==
In late 2002, John McMullen, who met Hartley at the PlanetOut launch party in September 1996 in San Francisco, California, offered Hartley a dating/relationship show on a proposed gay talk channel on Sirius Satellite Radio. In March 2003, while searching for a producer for the show, McMullen hired former activist Romaine Patterson to serve as producer and co-host of the show. The two met only once before beginning work together as a radio duo. The show launched in April 2003 as a three-hour talk show airing from 6 to 9 pm ET each weekday. Later the show was expanded to four hours from 6 to 10 pm ET. Guests on the show have included: Donald Trump, Martha Stewart, Meredith Vieira, Charo, Olivia Newton-John, Samuel L. Jackson, k.d. lang and Jenna Jameson.

In 2007 Derek Hartley was nominated for a GayVN Award for Best Non-Sex Performance in the film Big Rig by COLT Studio Group and the following year hosted the ceremonies.

Sirius XM cancelled Derek & Romaine on June 17, 2015.

Derek & Romaine has returned January 4, 2016 and is available via the show's website.

Hartley cowrote the screenplay for the 2018 comedy film Hurricane Bianca 2: From Russia with Hate.
