= HP (song) =

Song by Colombian singer Maluma

Single by Maluma

from the album 11:11
- Language: Spanish
- Released: 1 March 2019
- Genre: Reggaeton
- Length: 3:04
- Label: Sony Latin
- Songwriters: Juan Luis Londoño; Edgar Barrera; Giencarlos Rivera; Jonathan Rivera; Vicente Barco
- Producers: Edge; Madmusick

Maluma singles chronology
"Vivir Bailando" (2019)	"HP" (2019)	"Medellín" (2019)

Music video
- "HP" on YouTube

"HP" is a song by Colombian singer Maluma, released as a single from his fourth studio album, 11:11. The song was released as the album's lead single on 1 March 2019. The song marked Maluma's 13th number one on the Billboard Latin Airplay chart.

== Chart performance ==
For the week dated 8 June 2019, "HP" became Maluma's 13th number one on the Billboard Latin Airplay chart. This marked Maluma's second number one in 2019, following his Karol G collaboration, "Créeme", which ruled the chart for one week. "HP" also marked Maluma's 12th number one on the Latin Rhythm chart. It also topped the national charts in Ecuador, Paraguay and Venezuela, and reached the top 10 in multiple other territories.

== Music video ==
The music video was released alongside the song on 28 February 2019. It was directed by Nuno Gomes and filmed in Miami, Florida. In the video, Maluma throws a block party with friends to celebrate the protagonist being a single woman. The video has over 580 million views as of October 2019.

== Live performances ==
Maluma performed "HP" on The Tonight Show Starring Jimmy Fallon on 14 May 2019.

== Charts ==
=== Weekly charts ===
Chart (2019)	Peak position
Argentina (Argentina Hot 100)	6
Bolivia (Monitor Latino)	9
Chile (Monitor Latino)	6
Colombia (Monitor Latino)	2
Colombia (National-Report)	2
Costa Rica (Monitor Latino)	6
Dominican Republic (Monitor Latino)	7
Ecuador (Monitor Latino)	2
Ecuador (National-Report)	1
Guatemala (Monitor Latino)	13
Honduras (Monitor Latino)	4
Italy (FIMI)	26
Mexico (Billboard Mexican Airplay)	1
Mexico (Monitor Latino)	1
Panama (Monitor Latino)	11
Paraguay (Monitor Latino)	1
Peru (Monitor Latino)	8
Puerto Rico (Monitor Latino)	2
Spain (Promusicae)	4
Switzerland (Schweizer Hitparade)	48
US Billboard Hot 100	96
US Hot Latin Songs (Billboard)	8
US Latin Airplay (Billboard)	1
US Latin Rhythm Airplay (Billboard)	1
Venezuela (Monitor Latino)	1

=== Year-end charts ===
Chart (2019)	Position
Italy (FIMI)	86
Portugal (AFP)	93
Spain (PROMUSICAE)	18
US Hot Latin Songs (Billboard)	16

== Certifications ==
Region	Certification	Certified units/sales
Brazil (Pro-Música Brasil)	Platinum	40,000^{‡}
Canada (Music Canada)	Gold	40,000^{‡}
Italy (FIMI)	Platinum	70,000^{‡}
Mexico (AMPROFON)	2× Diamond+Gold	630,000^{‡}
Portugal (AFP)	Platinum	10,000^{‡}
Spain (Promusicae)	3× Platinum	180,000^{‡}
Switzerland (IFPI Switzerland)	Gold	10,000^{‡}
United States (RIAA)	11× Platinum (Latin)	660,000^{‡}
^{‡} Sales+streaming figures based on certification alone.

== See also ==
- List of Billboard Argentina Hot 100 top-ten singles in 2019
- List of Billboard number-one Latin songs of 2019
