= OutQ =

Sirius XM satellite radio channel

- Broadcast area: Contiguous United States & Canada

Programming
- Language: English
- Format: LGBT

Ownership
- Owner: Sirius XM Radio

History
- First air date: April 14, 2003 (via Sirius Satellite Radio)
- Last air date: February 13, 2016
- Former frequencies: Sirius 149 (2003-2005); Sirius 109 (2007-2011); XM 98 (2008-2011); SiriusXM 108 (2011-2014); SiriusXM 106 (2014-2016)

OutQ was a news, talk and entertainment channel on Sirius XM Radio, targeted for gay, lesbian, bisexual and transgender audiences. Launched in April 2003, the channel was available to Sirius and XM subscribers in both the United States and Canada. The channel was canceled in 2016.

== History ==
OutQ launched on Sirius satellite radio in April 2003. Vice president of entertainment and information programming at Sirius, Jay Clark, compared the choice to create a channel for LGBTQ listeners to creating Christian music and conservative talk channels, stating “I think the time has come.” The channel made its debut at 12:00 p.m. on a Tuesday, beginning with the show hosted by the station's program director, John McMullen. It went on to have live broadcasts from 3:00 a.m. to 6:00 p.m. with repeated content on weekends and weekday evenings.

Personalities associated with the channel included Frank DeCaro, Doria Biddle, Larry Flick, Lance Bass, Derek Hartley, and Romaine Patterson. Tim Curran served as the channel's news director, with Xorje Olivares as the lead anchor. OutQ News changed its schedule on August 4, 2013, leaving behind its top-of-the-hour format in favor of a daily news review aired at 6pm EST.

On November 20, 2006, station founder and show host John McMullen was relieved of his duties.

SiriusXM canceled OutQ's satellite broadcast on February 13, 2016, and the streaming service followed on February 18th.
