= Lyndsey Parker =

American journalist

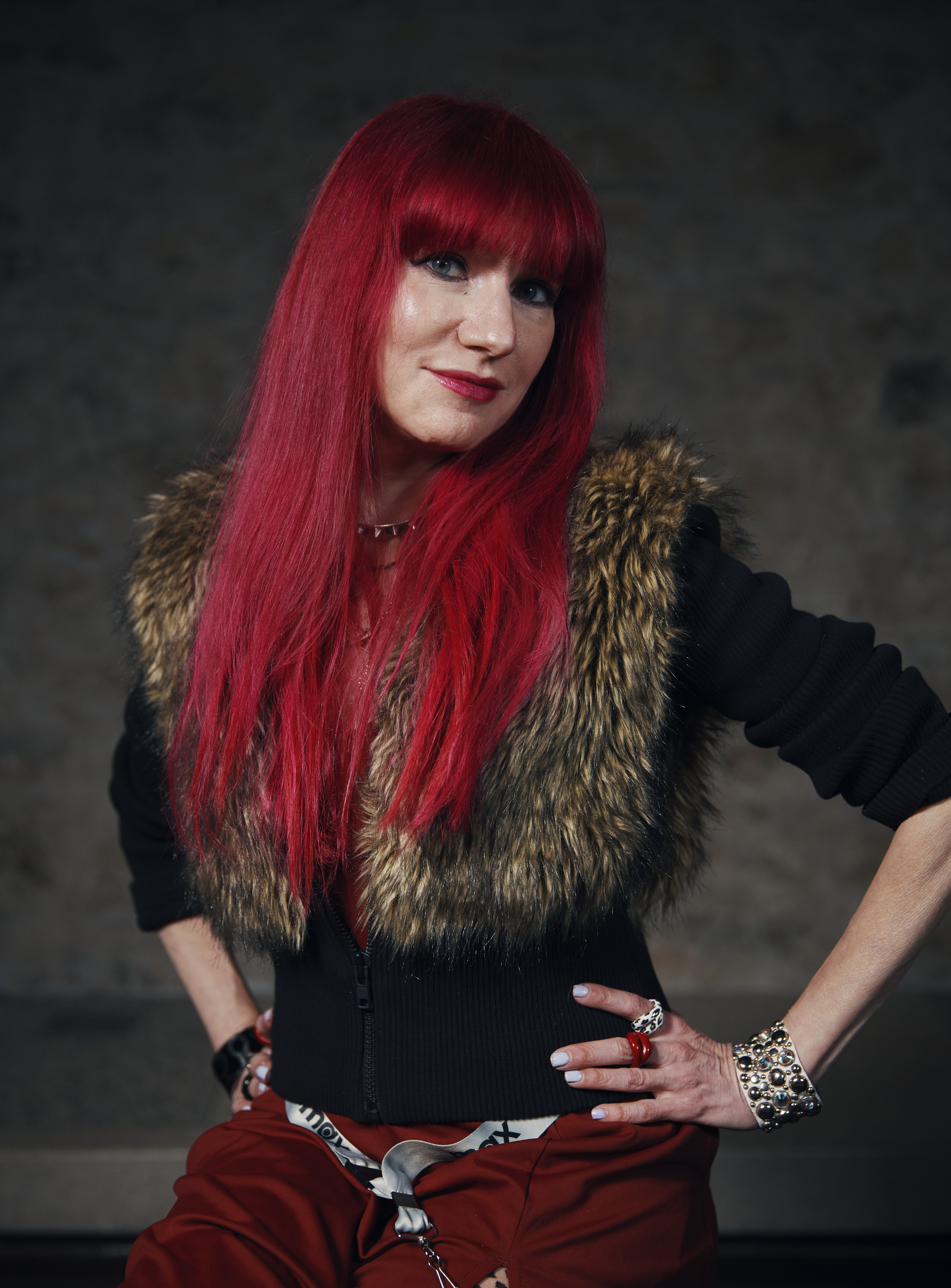
- Parker in 2024
- Born: Tarzana, California, US
- Education: University of California, Los Angeles
- Occupations: Journalist, author
- Website: lyndsanity.com

Lyndsey Parker is an American entertainment journalist and author. A former managing editor at Yahoo! Music, she focuses on music and pop culture. She is the author of Reality Rocks, a column that covers television shows such as The Voice and American Idol and the co-host of the vlog, The Day After.

On May 28, 2018, Parker began hosting the weekly SiriusXM show "VOLUME West" along with Chad Smith of the Red Hot Chili Peppers. The weekly satellite radio show focuses on music and features special guests. Earlier in the year, she became one of the rotating panelists of musicians and industry experts on the AXSTV show The Top Ten Revealed joining, among others, Steven Adler, Jerry Greenberg, and Kenny Aronoff.

Parker wrote the Rhino ebook Careless Memories of Strange Behavior: My Notorious Life as a Duran Duran Fan, which was published in 2012. The "ultimate chronicle of one girl's very unglamorous, totally one-sided love affair with the 1980s' most glamorous band," it went to #1 on the iTunes Music Books chart. She wrote a weekly column for NME called "LA Woman" from 2007 to 2012.

In addition to several documentaries, Parker has appeared on MTV, CNN, Fox News, VH1's Behind the Music, Lifetime, Good Day L.A., Tavis Smiley, The Insider on CBS and she is a weekly music commentator on Fox 11 in Los Angeles.

Parker was the official music expert on the American Music Awards’ preshow in 2015 and host of The X Factor USA's official Google Hangout chats for Season 3 of the Fox series. From 2014 to 2015, she, alongside Katie Couric, hosted Yahoo! Music/Live Nation's original interview series "Backstage with Citi," which won a Bronze Cio Award in 2015. She has also acted in the Roger Corman films The Haunting of Morella and The Watchers 2.

Parker grew up in the San Fernando Valley and attended the University of California, Los Angeles. She began writing about music in Porkchops and Applesauce, a fanzine she published from 1993 to 1997, and worked as a marketing manager at Restless Records from 1992 to 1997. In 1997, she left the label to become the managing editor at Launch. She transitioned to Yahoo! after it acquired Launch in 2001.

A nominee for a 2012 Online Journalism Award, Parker has written for publications including Elle, NME, Mojo and Guitar Player.

Parker collaborated with the "Mae West of 1968", The GTOs Mercy Fontenot, to co-write Fontenot's memoir, Permanent Damage: Memoirs of an Outrageous Girl. It was published by Rare Bird in June 2021.
