= Romaine Patterson =

American LGBTQ activist

- Born: March 31, 1978 (age 48); Wyoming
- Occupations: Radio Host, Writer, & Comedian, Entrepreneur, Co- Owner of DNR Events Inc., Co-Owner of Resurgence Fitness & Performance
- Known for: The Angel Action, SiriusXM Radio Host, The Laramie Project, & LGBT Rights Activist
- Spouse: Iris (m. 2009)
- Children: 1

Romaine Patterson (born March 31, 1978) is an American LGBT rights activist, radio personality, and author. She first received national attention for her activism at the funeral of murdered gay student Matthew Shepard; the two became friends when Shepard moved to Casper, Wyoming to attend college. For twelve years up until June 2015, she and Derek Hartley co-hosted the Derek and Romaine show on SiriusXM's OutQ.

Patterson and Hartley launched their own independent online streaming network and returned to the air on January 4, 2016, via the show's website.

== Childhood and family ==
Born in Wyoming, Patterson is the youngest of eight children. Three of her brothers are gay, and one of them, Michael, died from AIDS. She spent several summers during high school in Denver, Colorado, living with her brothers and working at Diedrich's Coffee Shop.

Openly lesbian, Patterson lives in New Jersey with her wife Iris and her first child, a child born July 20, 2007, also named Romaine.

== Activism ==
Patterson's best-known activist work was her response to the anti-gay protests by Fred Phelps of the Westboro Baptist Church during the trials of Russell Henderson and Aaron McKinney for the murder of Matthew Shepard. Patterson organized counter protests known as "Angel Action", in which groups of people dressed as angels with extremely large wings that shielded the families from Phelps and his group. Patterson was later depicted in The Laramie Project, a play about the event based on interviews with the participants. In the film version of the play, she was portrayed by actress Christina Ricci. She was portrayed by Canadian actress Kristen Thomson in the TV movie The Matthew Shepard Story.

Patterson later worked at the Gay and Lesbian Alliance Against Defamation as a Regional Media Manager. She has written a book about her experiences as an activist since Shepard's death, called The Whole World Was Watching.

== Works ==
- Patterson, Romaine; Hinds, Patrick (2005). The Whole World Was Watching: Living in the Light of Matthew Shepard. Advocate Books. ISBN 1-55583-901-0.
