= Jacquire King =

American songwriter (born 1967)

- Born: January 11, 1967 (age 59); Washington, D.C., United States
- Genres: Rock, alternative rock, indie rock, alternative pop, folk, blues, Americana
- Occupation: Record producer
- Instruments: Programming, percussion, vocals, keyboards, guitar, bass guitar
- Years active: 1987–present

Jacquire King (born January 11, 1967) is an American record producer, recording engineer and mixer. King has worked with such notable artists as Zach Bryan, Kings of Leon, Tom Waits, James Bay, Kaleo, Modest Mouse, Shania Twain, Buddy Guy, Norah Jones, Of Monsters and Men, Cold War Kids, Punch Brothers, City and Colour, Robert Ellis, Dawes and others. His work has received more than 40 Grammy Award nominations to date.

== Career ==
King had his initial training in recording engineering at Recording Workshop in Chillicothe, Ohio. His first studio employment was in the Washington, D.C. area. In 1988, he moved to California and got a job at Different Fur Studios in San Francisco. King later interned for Dan Alexander at Coast Recorders, which led to him helping two friends open Toast Studios, where he began working as an assistant. After hearing that Tom Waits was looking for a new engineer, King auditioned and was chosen to engineer Waits' critically-acclaimed 1999 album Mule Variations at Prairie Sun Recording Studios.

King utilizes traditional analog techniques and equipment such as tracking to 2" analog tape, combined with modern technologies like computer-based recording via Pro Tools and software plug-ins that emulate classic outboard Universal Audio and Neve signal processing gear.

In 2007 Jacquire disassembled and modified his 40-channel Quad-Eight Coronado console, converting it into two identical 16-channel/32-input consoles, and in 2013, he established residency at Blackbird Studio G in Nashville, Tennessee, which served as his primary studio for the next 6 years.

In 2014 he hosted his first Mix With The Masters seminar at Studios La Fabrique in Saint-Rémy-de-Provence, France. In 2019, he established his own studio, LBT, in Nashville.

== Awards ==
- 2010 - Grammy Award - Record of the Year for Kings Of Leon's 'Use Somebody' awarded to Kings Of Leon (Caleb Followill, Jared Followill, Matthew Followill, Nathan Followill), artist. Jacquire King, engineer/mixer. Jacquire King & Angelo Petraglia, producers.
- 2003 - Grammy Award - Best Traditional Blues Album for Buddy Guy's 'Blues Singer'
- 1999 - Grammy Award - Best Contemporary Folk Album for Tom Waits's 'Mule Variations'

== Discography ==
Selected listing:

- Tom Waits, Mule Variations (1999)
- Switchfoot, Learning to Breathe (2000)
- Tom Waits, Alice (2002)
- Tom Waits, Blood Money (2002)
- Jars of Clay, Furthermore: From the Studio, From the Stage (2003)
- Billy Talent, Billy Talent (2003)
- Be Your Own Pet, Damn Damn Leash (2004)
- Modest Mouse, Good News for People Who Love Bad News (2004)
- Kings of Leon, Aha Shake Heartbreak (2005)
- Mutemath, Mutemath (2006)
- Archie Bronson Outfit, Derdang Derdang (2006)
- Be Your Own Pet, Summer Sensation (2006)
- The Features, Contrast (2006)
- Tom Waits, Orphans: Brawlers, Bawlers & Bastards (2006)
- Sea Wolf, Leaves in the River (2007)
- Josh Ritter, The Historical Conquests of Josh Ritter (2007)
- Annuals, Such Fun (2008)
- Seabird, 'Til We See the Shore (2008)
- Langhorne Slim, Langhorne Slim (2008)
- Mike Doughty, Golden Delicious (2008)
- Clinic, Do It! (2008)
- The Parlor Mob, And You Were a Crow (2008)
- Pictures and Sound, Pictures and Sound (2008)
- Kings of Leon, Only by the Night (2008)
- The Features, Some Kind of Salvation (2009)
- Norah Jones, The Fall (2009)
- Landon Pigg, The Boy Who Never (2009)
- Kings of Leon, Come Around Sundown (2010)
- Lissie, Catching a Tiger (2010)
- Amber Rubarth, A Common Case of Disappearing (2011)
- Tim Finn, The View Is Worth the Climb (2011)
- Cold War Kids, Mine Is Yours (2011)
- Melissa Etheridge, 4th Street Feeling (2012)
- Of Monsters and Men, My Head Is an Animal (2012)
- Punch Brothers, Who's Feeling Young Now? (2012)
- Dawes, Stories Don't End (2013)
- The Airborne Toxic Event, Such Hot Blood (2013)
- Jars of Clay, Inland (2013)
- Kings of Leon, "The Collection Box" (2013)
- Editors, The Weight of Your Love (2013)
- Of Monsters and Men, "Silhouettes" (2014)
- Dan Sultan, Blackbird (2014)
- Robert Ellis, The Lights from the Chemical Plant (2014)
- Ingrid Michaelson, Lights Out (2014)
- James Bay, "Let It Go" (2014)
- James Bay, "Hold Back the River" (2014)
- Della Mae, Della Mae (2015)
- James Bay, Chaos and the Calm (2015)
- Moon Taxi, Daybreaker (2015)
- City and Colour, If I Should Go Before You (2015)
- Foy Vance, The Wild Swan (2016)
- Kaleo, A/B (2016)
- You Me at Six, Night People (2017)
- Current Swell, When To Talk And When To Listen (2017)
- Picture This, Picture This (Picture This album) (2017)
- Chase Rice, Lambs & Lions (2017)
- Niall Horan, Flicker (2017)
- Shania Twain, Now (2017)
- Tom Waits, Brawlers / Bawlers / Bastards (2018)
- Daughtry, Cage to Rattle (2018)
- Cold War Kids, Audience (live) (2018)
- Parachute, Parachute (2019)
- City and Colour, A Pill For Loneliness (2019)
- Alexisonfire, Season Of The Flood (2020)
- Frank Mighty's Hotline, Whispersongs (2021)
- Zach Bryan, Zach Bryan (album) (2023)
- Zach Bryan. The Great American Bar Scene (2024)
