= Matt Pelham =

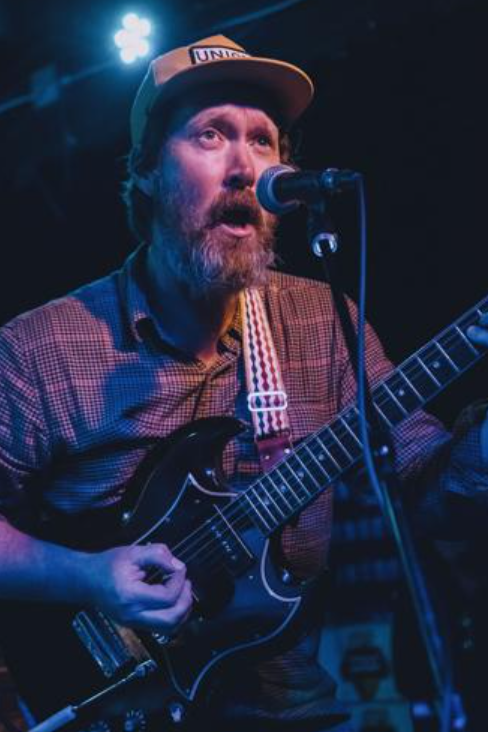

Background information
- Born: Sparta, Tennessee, United States of America
- Genres: Indie rock, indie pop, neo-psychedelia
- Occupation: Musician
- Instruments: Vocals, guitar
- Years active: 1993–2016; 2019; 2024-present
- Member of: Matt & The Watt Gives
- Formerly of: The Features

Matthew Pelham (born 1975) is an American singer, songwriter, and multi-instrumentalist, best known as the frontman and primary songwriter for the indie rock band The Features and Matt & The Watt Gives. Recognized for his distinct vocal delivery and nerve-jangling songwriting style, Pelham was a central figure in the Murfreesboro and Nashville independent music scenes from the mid-1990s through the 2010s.

== Early life and education ==
Pelham was born in 1975 in Sparta, Tennessee. He began playing music with his longtime collaborator, bassist Roger Dabbs, in the eighth grade. In 1994, while still in high school, he formed The Features with Dabbs and guitarist Don Sergio.

After graduating high school, Pelham and Dabbs moved to Murfreesboro to attend Middle Tennessee State University (MTSU). While there, they met Jason Taylor and Parrish Yaw, who joined as the band's drummer and keyboardist. As the group began gaining a following in the Murfreesboro and Nashville club scenes, Pelham and Dabbs dropped out of college to focus on the band full-time.

== Employment and professional trade ==
To support himself during the band's early years, Pelham worked as a temporary employee at the Pillsbury plant in Sparta. He described the job as a "soul-crushing" experience characterized by the strict divide between management and laborers. This period directly inspired one of his most well-known songs, "Temporary Blues."

Beyond his factory work, Pelham developed a career as a printmaker. He maintained this trade for many years to support his family and musical projects, balancing his work in print shops with the band's touring and recording schedules. Even as The Features grew in popularity, Pelham often cited the "juggling act" of managing his professional trade alongside his family and music.

== The Features ==
The band signed with Spongebath Records, a local label home to other Nashville-area acts like Self and Fluid Ounces. After the label folded in 2001, Pelham and the group continued independently. During this time, Pelham's personal life influenced his writing; the band's second EP was written following the birth of his twin daughters.

Following years of heavy touring, the band signed a deal with Universal Records, which released the band's first full-length album, Exhibit A, in 2004. After a dispute with the label, Pelham returned to independent releases until 2009, when the band became the first signing for the Kings of Leon's label, Serpents & Snakes. Between 2009 and 2013, Pelham released two more albums on the imprint before the label went quiet, leading him to self-release Sunset Rock in 2015, which served as the group's final studio album.

=== The Features hiatus and later activity ===
After a final performance at the Exit/In in Nashville on July 23, 2016, Pelham stepped away from public performance. Following three years of inactivity, Pelham and the original lineup of The Features reunited for a one-time charity concert on December 13, 2019, to benefit The Toy Drive Before Christmas.

In early 2023, Pelham began a partnership with Nashville-based yk Records to release expanded and unissued versions of The Features albums. This archival series began with the 2023 release of The Mahaffey Sessions 1999, an album recorded with producer Matt Mahaffey that had been shelved for over twenty years. In 2024, he oversaw a 15th-anniversary deluxe edition of Some Kind of Salvation featuring previously unreleased tracks.

This renewed focus on the band's legacy led to a January 2026 reunion for a series of benefit shows at the Eastside Bowl in Nashville, organized to support local public and community radio. Shortly after, in April 2026, he released Exhibit A (Original Sweet Tea Mix), restoring the album's original 2003 tracking and mix as recorded at Sweet Tea Studios.

== Matt & The Watt Gives ==
After an eight-year break from the music industry, Pelham returned in 2024 with a solo project called Matt & The Watt Gives. During his time away, he focused on his family and built a home recording studio called The Sun Room, where he wrote and recorded the majority of the project's debut material.

The project was officially announced in February 2024. Between October 2024 and May 2025, Pelham released a series of singles through yk Records, leading up to the release of the self-titled album, Matt & The Watt Gives, on June 13, 2025. The record explores Pelham's life during his hiatus and features a shift toward a more blues-rock and soul-influenced sound. While a solo project, the album includes musical contributions from former Features members Rollum Haas and Roger Dabbs.

One of the album's central tracks, "The Chemo Blues," serves as an honest response to his experiences with cancer. Pelham wrote the song to address the frequent, well-meaning questions he received regarding his health during his years away from the spotlight.

The album's visual art was created by Pelham's daughter, Edith Pelham. To celebrate the release, the band performed a show on June 28, 2025, at the Olive & Sinclair Chocolate Co. in East Nashville. In October 2025, the Nashville Scene named the record the "Best Comeback Album" in its year-end honors.
