= Mommy (album) =

Studio album by Be Your Own Pet
- Released: August 25, 2023
- Length: 35:47
- Label: Third Man
- Producers: Jeremy Ferguson; Be Your Own Pet

Be Your Own Pet chronology
Get Damaged (2008)	Mommy (2023)

Singles from Mommy
- 1. "Hand Grenade" Released: March 30, 2023; 2. "Worship the Whip" Released: May 31, 2023; 3. "Goodtime!" Released: June 28, 2023; 4. "Big Trouble" Released: July 26, 2023

Mommy is the third full-length studio album by American punk/garage rock band Be Your Own Pet, released August 25, 2023 via Third Man Records. Mommy marks the group's first recorded material in almost fifteen years following the release of their second studio album, Get Awkward and subsequent break-up in 2008.

The album was preceded by four singles, "Hand Grenade", "Worship the Whip", "Goodtime!" and "Big Trouble" released March 30, May 31, June 28, and July 26, 2023 respectively.

== Background ==
Following a fourteen-year hiatus, Be Your Own Pet reunited in 2021 after lead singer, Jemina Pearl and guitarist, Jonas Stein were convinced by Pearl's husband and Third Man Records co-owner, Ben Swank to reconnect on a personal level with each other after many years without communication since the band's tumultuous split in 2008. Swank also expressed the idea of re-releasing the group's first two full-length's, 2006's self-titled and 2008's Get Awkward through Third Man Records as a part of a retrospective series for the label. The idea prompted Pearl in reaching out to remaining members, bassist Nathan Vasquez and drummer John Eatherly about a reunion, which was agreed to under the condition that new music would be created.

At the end of 2021, upon discovering the group was active once again Swank's business partner, American musician and songwriter, Jack White expressed interest in having Be Your Own Pet as one of the opening acts on a few select dates of his 2022 North American Supply Chain Issues Tour. The band would serve as support acts during the New York, Atlanta and Nashville shows of the tour and mark as the band's live debut performances since their break up, with the former taking place at Barclays Center on April 21. 2022.

Following the tour, the band would spend the rest of 2022, writing and recording material for their third studio album at Battle Tapes Recording in Nashville with longtime collaborator, engineer and producer, Jeremy Ferguson.

== Critical reception ==
Professional ratings
Aggregate scores
Source	Rating
Metacritic	83/100
Review scores
Source	Rating
Allmusic	4/5 stars
The Arts Desk	4/5 stars
DIY	4.5/5 stars
The Line of Best Fit	7/10
Slant Magazine	2.5/5 stars
Uncut	8/10

Mommy received a score of 83 out of 100 on review aggregator Metacritic based on eleven critics' reviews, indicating "universal acclaim" reception. Uncut remarked that the band are "bummed to learn that adulthood breeds more angst than adolescence, which inspires a sharp-edged '70s hard rock, with songs celebrating kink and demanding equal pay and full-body autonomy on 'Big Trouble'". DIY's Joe Goggins stated that "the ferocious energy that defined Be Your Own Pet first time around, however, remains, as does their knack for a nagging earworm of a chorus. Searing hooks and soaring melodies channel through a frontwoman with limitless charisma".

== Track listing ==
All tracks are written by Jemina Abegg, John Eatherly, Jonas Stein, and Nathan Vasquez.

No.	Title	Length
1.	"Worship the Whip"	3:01
2.	"Goodtime!"	2:48
3.	"Erotomania"	2:06
4.	"Bad Mood Rising"	3:30
5.	"Never Again"	2:23
6.	"Pleasure Seeker"	3:52
7.	"Rubberist"	4:30
8.	"Big Trouble"	3:05
9.	"Hand Grenade"	2:57
10.	"Drive"	3:27
11.	"Teenage Heaven"	4:08
Total length:		35:47

== Personnel ==
Credits are adapted from the album's liner notes.

Be Your Own Pet

- Jemina Pearl – lead vocals, production
- Jonas Stein – guitar, backing vocals, production
- Nathan Vasquez – bass, backing vocals, production
- John Eatherly – drums, backing vocals, production

Technical

- Jeremy Ferguson – production, mixing, engineering
- Mastered by Bill Skibbe

Artwork

- Jordan Williams – design
- Marzena Abrahamik – photography

== Charts ==
Chart performance for Mommy
Chart (2023)	Peak position
UK Album Downloads (Official Charts)	83
UK Independent Albums (Official Charts)	10
