= Picture This =

Picture This may refer to:

== Music ==
- Picture This (band), an Irish pop rock band

=== Albums ===
- Picture This (Gary Burton album), 1982
- Picture This – The Essential Blondie Collection, 1998
- Picture This (Huey Lewis and the News album), 1982
- Picture This (Wet Wet Wet album), 1995
- Picture This (Do or Die album), 1996
- Picture This (Picture This album), 2017
- Picture This, a 1997 album by Jim Brickman
- Picture This, a 1993 album by Debbie Davies

=== Songs ===
- "Picture This", the lead single from Kero Kero Bonito's debut album Bonito Generation
- "Picture This" (song), a song by Blondie from the 1978 album Parallel Lines
- "Picture This (Interlude)" a song by Danity Kane from the album Welcome To The Dollhouse
- "Picture This", a song by Big Time Rush from their 2013 album 24/Seven
- "Picture This", a song by the Beastie Boys from Hello Nasty

== Literature ==
- Picture This (novel), a 1988 novel by Joseph Heller

== Film, TV and radio ==
- Picture This (2008 film), a film starring Ashley Tisdale
- Picture This (2025 film), a British romantic comedy film
- Picture This, the second series of the British radio series The Chain Gang
- Picture This (British TV series), a 2008 British cross-platform project about photography that included a short television series on Channel 4
- Picture This (American TV program), a 1948–1949 American 10-minute television program hosted by Wendy Barrie that aired on NBC
- Picture This, a 1963 American game show hosted by Jerry Van Dyke on CBS
- Picture This!, an episode of Barney & Friends
- Picture This, an episode of season 2 of Bear in the Big Blue House
- Picture This, an episode of season 2 of Phineas and Ferb
- Picture This, an episode of Pocoyo
