= The Kelly affair =

The Kelly Affair may refer to:

- The affair relating to weapons of mass destruction in Iraq and the death of UK government inspector David Kelly.
- The Carrie Nations, a fictional all-female band from the 1970 film Beyond the Valley of the Dolls, who were originally known under the name The Kelly Affair
- a single from the 2008 Be Your Own Pet album Get Awkward
