= The Blackpool Letters =

Studio album by Scott Liss & the Sixty-Six
- Released: 11 June 2010
- Recorded: 2008, 2009 (Retromedia Sound Studios, Red Bank, New Jersey)
- Genre: Psychedelic; Indie rock Acoustic rock Alternative
- Length: 48:09
- Producer: Paul Ritchie, Scott Liss

The Blackpool Letters is the second studio album by the American singer/songwriter Scott Liss and the first recorded with his band the Sixty-Six. It was recorded over a period spanning January 2008 through September 2009 at Retromedia Sound Studios in Red Bank, New Jersey with producer and engineer Paul Ritchie. The design and artwork was produced by artist Hetch.

== Track listing ==
All tracks written and arranged by Scott Liss.

1. "Shotgun" – 4:25
2. "Miles" – 3:26
3. "Sweet Hearts Spin" – 4:17
4. "Virtue & Vice" – 3:58
5. "The Body Breaks" – 4:43
6. "God Rest Your Soul in the Sand" – 4:14
7. "The Blackpool Letters" – 1:08
8. "I Should Begin" – 4:25
9. "At First Light" – 5:10
10. "Late November" – 3:38
11. "Lloyd Braun" – 3:45
12. "When Caution Comes" – 3:49

== Reviews ==
"The Blackpool Letters is a scary calling card of monstrous production, talent and performance...Scott Liss and the Sixty-Six are the area’s rising secret weapon and there is no way in hell this band won’t go on to bigger and better things. My advice would be to immediately buy this disc and see these guys locally before they wind up in New York or LA." - John Pfeiffer, The Aquarian Weekly

"The Blackpool Letters is an innovative display of raw musicianship by three of Asbury's hardest-working and most uncompromised musical talents." -Steve Bove, Asbury Park Press

"An honest statement...rooted within the virtues of rising above the madness." - Martin Halo, TheWaster.com

== Release history ==
The Blackpool Letters was released in the United States, Canada, and digitally online in 2010.
