= BYOP =

BYOP may refer to:

- Be Your Own Pet, a punk/garage rock band
- Bring your own phone, a phone use policy in the workplace
