= Damn Damn Leash =

Single by Be Your Own Pet
- B-side: "Electric Shake"; "Spill"
- Released: 2004 (United States); 2005 (Europe and Japan)
- Studio: Studio 491, Nashville, Tennessee; The Play Room, Nashville, Tennessee
- Genre: Garage punk
- Length: 1:52
- Label: Infinity Cat Recordings (USA); XL Recordings (EU); Hostess Entertainment (JA)
- Songwriters: Jemina Pearl; Jamin Orrall; Jonas Stein; Nathan Vasquez
- Producers: Angelo Petraglia; Robert Ellis Orrall; Jacquire King

Be Your Own Pet singles chronology
"Damn Damn Leash" (2004)	"Extra Extra" (2005)

Professional ratings
Review scores
Source	Rating
Drowned in Sound	(8/10)
Robert Christgau	(1-star Honorable Mention)

"Damn Damn Leash" is Be Your Own Pet's first single. It was released in 2004 in the United States and in 2005 in Europe and Japan.

== Track listings and formats ==
All tracks are written by Jemina Pearl, Jamin Orrall, Jonas Stein, and Nathan Vasquez.

2004 US CD single
No.	Title	Length
1.	"Damn Damn Leash"	1:52
2.	"Electric Shake"	3:06
Total length:		4:58

2005 UK CD and US/UK digital single
No.	Title	Length
1.	"Damn Damn Leash"	1:52
2.	"Spill"	2:27
3.	"Electric Shake"	3:06
Total length:		7:25

2005 UK 7" vinyl single
No.	Title	Length
1.	"Damn Damn Leash"	1:52
2.	"Spill"	2:27
Total length:		4:19

== Personnel ==
Credits adapted from the single's liner notes.

Be Your Own Pet

- Jemina Pearl – lead vocals
- Jonas Stein – guitar
- Nathan Vasquez – bass
- Jamin Orrall – drums

Production

- Jim DeMain – mastering
- Hollis Flatt – mastering
- Capers Flen – mixing on "Spill"
- Jacquire King – producer, mixing on "Damn Damn Leash" and "Electric Shake"
- Roger Moutenot – recording engineer
- Robert Ellis Orrall – production
- Angelo Petraglia – production

Artwork

- Jimmy Abegg – photography

== Charts ==
Peak chart positions for "Damn Damn Leash"
Chart (2005)	Peak position
UK Singles Chart (OCC)	68
