= Paul Ritchie =

Paul Ritchie is the name of:

- Paul Ritchie (musician), American musician, producer, guitarist for The Parlor Mob
- Paul Ritchie (footballer, born 1969), Scottish football player (East Fife)
- Paul Ritchie (footballer, born 1975), Scottish football player (Heart of Midlothian)
