= Leave It All Behind (disambiguation) =

Leave It All Behind is a 2008 album by The Foreign Exchange, or the title song.

Leave It All Behind may also refer to:

- "Leave It All Behind", a song by The Features from Exhibit A
- "Leave It All Behind", a song by Five Finger Death Punch from F8
