= Wilderness (The Features album) =

Studio album by The Features
- Released: July 26, 2011
- Genres: Indie rock, new wave
- Labels: Serpents & Snakes
- Producers: Brian Carter, The Features

The Features chronology
Some Kind of Salvation (2008)	Wilderness (2011)	The Features (2013)

Singles from Wilderness
- 1. "Rambo" Released: May 31, 2011; 2. "How It Starts" Released: June 5, 2012; 3. "Another One" Released: September 14, 2012; 4. "Kids" Released: 2012 (Date Unknown)

Wilderness is the third studio album by American rock band The Features, which was released on July 26, 2011, on the Serpents & Snakes label. The album included 11 tracks and one bonus track.

== Track listing ==
No.	Title	Length
1.	"Content"	2:33
2.	"Kids"	2:36
3.	"Another One"	2:48
4.	"Big Mama Gonna Whip Us Good"	3:20
5.	"How It Starts"	3:21
6.	"Rambo"	3:13
7.	"Offer Up"	2:23
8.	"Golden Comb"	3:34
9.	"Fat Domino"	4:33
10.	"Love Is..."	3:37
11.	"Chapter III"	4:06
12.	"This Much I Know (bonus track)"	3:38
