= Langhorne Slim (album) =

Studio album by Langhorne Slim
- Released: 29 April 2008
- Genre: Alternative country
- Length: 35:48
- Language: English
- Label: Kemado
- Producers: Brian Deck, Sam Kassirer, Malachi DeLorenzo

Langhorne Slim chronology
Engine EP (2006)	Langhorne Slim (2008)	Be Set Free (2009)

Singles from Langhorne Slim
- 1. "Restless" Released: 18 March 2008

Professional ratings
Review scores
Source	Rating
Allmusic	link
Tiny Mix Tapes	link
The A.V. Club	(B+) link
Paste	(Positive) link

Langhorne Slim is the third studio album by the New York-based folk singer Langhorne Slim and is the first album released under the Kemado recording label, released in 2008.

== Track listing ==
1. "Spinning Compass" – 1:54
2. "Rebel Side of Heaven" – 2:33
3. "Restless" – 2:17
4. "Sometimes" – 3:06
5. "She's Gone" – 3:19
6. "Colette" – 3:47
7. "Hello Sunshine" – 2:27
8. "Diamonds and Gold" – 3:40
9. "The Honeymoon" – 2:03
10. "The Tipping Point" – 2:07
11. "Oh Honey" – 1:47
12. "Worries" – 2:51
13. "Hummingbird" – 4:07

== Personnel ==
=== Band Members ===
- Langhorne Slim - Vocals, Guitars, Keyboards
- Malachi DeLorenzo - Percussion, Vocals, Producer, Engineer, Mixing
- Paul DeFiglia - Basses, Strings, Vocals

=== Other Crew ===
- Brian Deck - Producer, Engineer, Mixing, Effects
- Jacquire King - Mixing
- Jim Becker - Violin
- Sam Kassirer - Kerboards, Percussion, Producer, Engineer, Mixing
- Keith Abrahamsson - A&R
- Dan Nosheny - Trombone, Tuba
