= The Lights from the Chemical Plant =

Studio album by Robert Ellis
- Released: February 11, 2014
- Genre: Country
- Length: 53:59
- Label: New West
- Producer: Jacquire King

Robert Ellis chronology
Photographs (2011)	The Lights from the Chemical Plant (2014)

Professional ratings
Aggregate scores
Source	Rating
Metacritic	81/100
Review scores
Source	Rating
Paste Magazine	8.6/10
AllMusic	4/5 stars

The Lights from the Chemical Plant is the third studio album by Nashville-based singer-songwriter Robert Ellis. It was released in February 2014 under New West Records.

Ellis recorded the album in Eric Masse's East Nashville studio the Casino under the direction of producer Jacquire King. Ellis has said The Lights from the Chemical Plant, inspired by his hometown Lake Jackson, Texas, is more "stylistically ambiguous" than his previous albums incorporating elements of R&B, bossa nova, fusion and free jazz.

On June 30, 2014 NPR Music listed the track "Chemical Plant" as one of the 50 Favorite Songs Of 2014 (So Far) .

== Track listing ==
No.	Title	Length
1.	"TV Song"	4:46
2.	"Chemical Plant"	4:29
3.	"Good Intentions"	2:47
4.	"Steady as the Rising Sun"	4:09
5.	"Bottle of Wine"	6:31
6.	"Still Crazy After All These Years"	3:51
7.	"Pride"	5:00
8.	"Only Lies"	3:50
9.	"Houston"	7:12
10.	"Sing Along"	4:09
11.	"Tour Song"	7:15
