= The Features =

American band

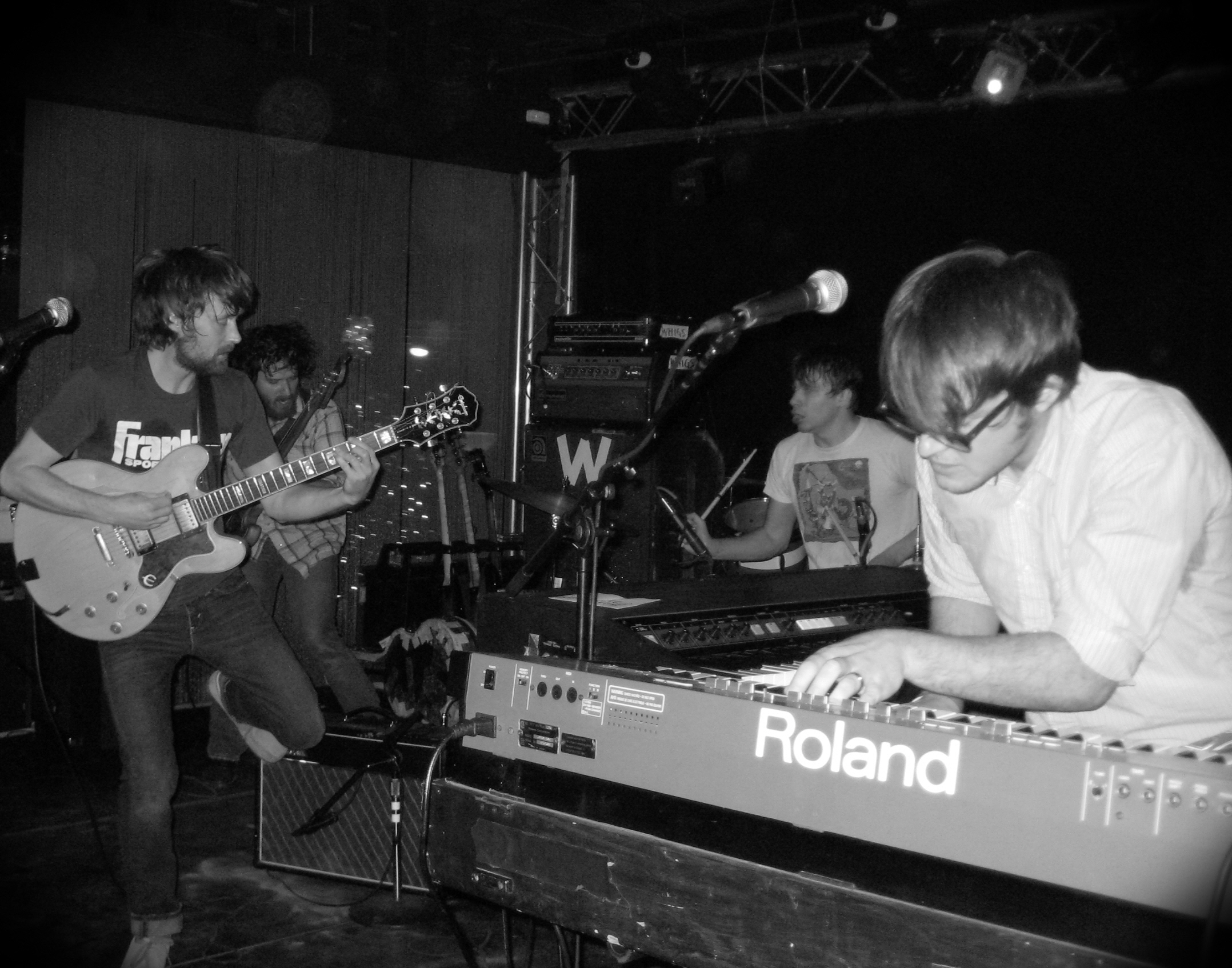
- The Features in December 2009

Background information
- Origin: Sparta, Tennessee, United States of America
- Genres: Indie rock, indie pop, neo-psychedelia
- Years active: 1994–2016; 2019; 2026
- Labels: Spongebath Records; Fierce Panda; Universal Records; Serpents & Snakes; YK Records
- Members: Matt Pelham; Roger Dabbs; Rollum Haas; Mark Bond
- Past members: Don Sergio; Jason Taylor; Parrish Yaw
- Website: The Features

The Features is an American indie rock band from Sparta, Tennessee. The Features have released six full-length studio albums, three EPs, two compilation albums, and 18 singles. The current lineup of the band comprises lead singer/guitarist Matt Pelham, bassist Roger Dabbs, drummer Rollum Haas, and keyboardist Mark Bond. Their sound was described as “somewhere between the pure rock 'n' roll of the British Invasion and the electronic, synth-happy beats that characterized ‘80s pop.”

The Features formed in 1994 and signed with Nashville’s Spongebath Records in 1997. Called “the greatest rock band Nashville has ever seen,” they released two EPs and a pair of singles before signing with Universal Records in 2003.

With a lineup of Pelham, Dabbs, Haas, and keyboardist Parrish Yaw, The Features’ first full-length album, Exhibit A, was released by Universal the following year, and they promoted the record by touring with fellow Tennessee-based band Kings of Leon. Amid creative differences between the band and label, Universal Records dropped The Features two weeks before they were scheduled to enter the studio to make their second full-length record. Soon after, Yaw left the band and was replaced by Bond.

The Features self-released an EP, Contrast, in 2006, and then self-released their second full-length album, Some Kind of Salvation, in 2008. The following year, Kings of Leon started a new record label imprint called Serpents & Snakes for the sole purpose of signing The Features. The band would re-release Some Kind of Salvation and release their next two full-length albums – 2011’s Wilderness and a self-titled album in 2013 – on the Serpents & Snakes label.

Two of their songs – “How It Starts” and “This Disorder” – charted in the Top 40 of Billboard's Alternative Songs chart. The Features twice appeared as a musical guest on Jimmy Kimmel Live! Their songs have been featured in television advertisements, video games, and movies.

The Features’ fifth full-length album, Sunset Rock, was released in 2015, but the band went on hiatus the following year. An album recorded earlier in their career, The Mahaffey Sessions 1999, was released by YK Records in 2023. Over the past several years, The Features have only reunited on rare occasions for charitable events.

== History ==
Matt Pelham and Roger Dabbs began playing music together in the late-1980s, and Pelham and Dabbs formed The Features in Sparta, Tennessee, in 1994 with guitarist Don Sergio. The three founding members soon moved to Murfreesboro, Tennessee, in the mid-1990s, where they met drummer Jason Taylor. Sergio brought friend and keyboardist Parrish Yaw into the group, and The Features began making a name for themselves playing bars and clubs around Murfreesboro and Nashville.

=== Spongebath Records and The Beginning (1997-2003) ===
Within a few years, The Features signed a record deal with Spongebath Records, a local independent label that featured several of the biggest rock acts in the Nashville area, such as Self, The Katies, and Fluid Ounces. The Features’ first release, a six-song self-titled EP, was released in 1997.

Soon after, Sergio and Taylor both left the band. Taylor was replaced by drummer Rollum Haas, and The Features moved forward as a four-member band.

The Features recorded numerous tracks for Spongebath over the next several years; they produced enough tracks to fill four albums, yet none of these albums were released at the time. The delay was attributed to both Spongebath’s lack of confidence in the band’s material and Pelham’s insistence on perfection. However, four songs by The Features were included on two Spongebath compilation albums, Soaking in the Center of the Universe, in 1998.

In 1999, The Features released their first single, “Thursday.” The song immediately became a fan favorite, with The Features often closing their shows with the song. “Thursday” would become the band’s most performed song live.

Spongebath Records permanently closed in 2001, so The Features self-released their second EP, titled The Beginning, that year. Called “a joyous, springtime release” and “strongly recommended” by PopMatters, The Beginning began to attract a wider audience to The Features.

The Features released their second single, “Buffalo Head,” in 2002 through Nashville-based Fictitious Records. The following year, The Features re-released The Beginning in the United Kingdom under the London-based Fierce Panda Records label. The Fierce Panda re-release featured the same five tracks as the original release but in a different order.

=== Universal Records and Exhibit A (2003-2005) ===
The band’s incessant touring and critical buzz eventually led to a deal with Universal Records. Universal signed The Features to a one-year, two-option deal, meaning the band would release one record and give the label the option to release the next two albums if they liked them or release them from the terms if they didn’t. Universal began by re-releasing (for the third time) their sophomore EP, The Beginning. Universal kept the same track order as the Fierce Panda version but tacked a sixth song onto the end, “The Way It’s Meant To Be.”

“The Way It’s Meant To Be” also became the first single released by Universal for the band ahead of their full-length album debut, Exhibit A. Exhibit A was released on September 14, 2004, along with its second single, “There's a Million Ways to Sing the Blues".

Reviews of Exhibit A were generally positive. The Music Box gave it three out of five stars, declaring, “Simply put, this is purebred rock ’n‘ roll in all its rampaging, electrothermal glory.” AllMusic gave it 3.5 stars out of five, stating, “The Features serve up energetic rock from the get-go on their full-length debut…the energy and freewheeling nature of this short full-length makes for a rewarding listen.” InsidePulse observed, “[W]ith many songs on this album, you often are waiting and wanting for more…Exhibit A is a full-length worth investigating.”

On March 23, 2004, The Features were the guest on the MTV2 show Subterranean, which was the successor to the MTV program 120 Minutes. That December, The Features self-released a holiday single, “The New Christmas Wish Book” (often called “Father Christmas”, due to a repeated lyric). The following month, they released another single from Exhibit A, "Leave It All Behind."

The Features made their first appearance as a musical guest on Jimmy Kimmel Live! on February 2, 2005, performing “The Way It’s Meant To Be”. The Features then released their fourth single from Exhibit A, “Blow It Out,” two months later. "Blow It Out" received moderate television exposure when an ad agency heard it and contacted The Features about using it for a two-week run on CBS.

The Features went on multiple tours of the U.K., opening for fellow Tennessee-based band Kings of Leon. The two bands became strong supporters of each other, with Kings of Leon calling The Features their “new favorite band.” “The first time I saw them play, you should have seen me,” Kings of Leon frontman Caleb Followill said. “I was puking round the back, shaking. ‘We can't follow these guys!’ That’s how I feel every time I see them.”

=== Split from Universal and Contrast (2005-2006) ===
Sales of Exhibit A were lukewarm at best, and songs from the album didn’t receive the radio airplay the band or Universal had hoped for. “Before the record came out, there was pretty much no press and no publicity,” Pelham said. “But six months after the record came out, that’s when a press team really started working for us. And by that time, anyone at press had either already heard of us or said, ‘Well, this record’s been out for six months. It’s too late for us to write about it.’ It fell apart.”

When The Features were two weeks away from entering the studio for their second album with Universal, the label told the band that they needed to cover The Beatles’ “All You Need Is Love” for use in a Chase Bank credit card commercial. Universal demanded an answer from the band in an hour and a finished song in two days. In addition, Universal wanted The Features to put the song on their next album and release it as a single.

The band balked. “From the beginning it felt very wrong, the whole idea of it…to ask us to cover a song without some sort of permission, especially ‘All You Need Is Love,’ seemed wrong,” Pelham said. Haas added, “That Beatles song for that commercial feels really wrong to me.”

But according to Pelham, Universal had already obligated the band to do the commercial and told the band, “If you don’t do this, you’re gonna lose your record deal.” The Features refused, and Universal dropped their option, leaving the band without a label. Nada Surf recorded the song for the advertising campaign instead.

In the wake of this decision, keyboardist Parrish Yaw left the band and was replaced by Mark Bond. In 2006, The Features self-released a single, “Late Night”. It was the last record for The Features with Parrish on keyboards.

Now operating without a label, The Features self-released their third EP, Contrast, in 2006. The EP featured the track “I Will Wander”, a remix of which was later used in the UEFA Euro 2008 video game for PC, Xbox 360, and PlayStation 2. Contrast also included the track “Wooden Heart,” which would be remixed and included in The Features’ next full-length album.

=== Some Kind of Salvation and Serpents & Snakes (2007-2010) ===
In 2007, The Features won the international Diesel:U:Music Awards, placing first in the Rock/Indie category and in the Public Vote award. Also that year, lead singer Matt Pelham penned and performed the theme song for a short-lived ABC sitcom, Carpoolers.

The Features contributed a track to a compilation album for Zync Music in 2008 titled Zync Covered Vol. 1. The band covered John Lennon’s “Instant Karma!,” shortly after their departure from Universal for refusing to cover Lennon’s “All You Need Is Love” for a bank commercial. Outside of four tracks that appeared on two compilation albums for Spongebath Records in 1998, “Instant Karma!” is the only known instance where The Features contributed a non-album track to a compilation album.

On September 30, 2008, The Features self-released their second full-length album, Some Kind of Salvation. “Lions” was chosen as the first single released from the album and was later featured in the trailer for the film She's Out of My League.

The opening track, “Whatever Gets You By,” was featured in the film Lucky, starring Colin Hanks, as well as the trailer to the Mike Judge film Extract. The first lines of “Whatever Gets You By” reference the band’s journey by mentioning their first Universal single: “So here we are / It’s like we never really left the start / Time heals the wound, but then there’s still a scar / To remind us of The Way It’s Meant To Be.”

Critical reviews of Some Kind of Salvation were generally positive. AllMusic described the album as “a solid, danceable brand of new wave rock with intelligent lyrics and plenty of verve” while giving it four out of five stars. Treble Magazine called the record “about as flawless as pop albums come.”

ClashMusic declared, “It’s been a long (and winding) road for The Features, but ‘Some Kind Of Salvation’ looks set to get the attention it deserves,” while giving the album a seven out of ten. “Paced well and spring-loaded with memorable tunes, Some Kind of Salvation rewards everyone who hoped Exhibit A wasn’t a brilliant fluke,” OC Weekly wrote.

In 2009, Kings of Leon started a new record label imprint called Serpents & Snakes for the sole purpose of signing The Features. “We’ve been long-time supporters of The Features,” Kings of Leon singer Jared Followill said. “They’re one of the best undiscovered bands in the world.” The Features re-released Some Kind of Salvation on the Serpents & Snakes label in 2009 and released their second single from the album, “The Temporary Blues,” the following year.

Tracks from Some Kind of Salvation were featured in a pair of television shows on the CW network. The song "Off Track" was heard in a 2009 episode of The Vampire Diaries. In 2010, "Off Track" and "The Temporary Blues" were used in two episodes of the show One Tree Hill.

=== Wilderness (2011-2012) ===
On July 26, 2011, the Features released their third full-length album, Wilderness, on the Serpents & Snakes label. Two months earlier, to promote the album’s release, The Features released their first single off the album, “Rambo.”

The album was met with mixed reviews from critics. PopMatters rated Wilderness six out of ten and praised the album’s first single: “The best thing here is ‘Rambo’ – from the humming monks on the intro to the haunting, swirling, and wonderfully skyscraping choruses. In those expanses between Pelham’s lines, it feels like a breath of fresh air.” American Songwriter gave it 3.5 stars out of five, writing, “On Wilderness, The Features do a great job of synthesizing several genres, mainly indie rock and new wave, to create songs that retain their signature, unmistakable sound.” MVRemix Rock declared, “With strong, punchy beats and an impressive collectiveness, The Features’ newest album sounds as well constructed if not stronger than 2009’s Some Kind of Salvation.”

Other reviews weren’t as favorable. DIY Magazine gave the album 2.5 stars out of five, writing, “This is less like the wilderness and more like an overgrown garden.” SputnikMusic rated it three stars out of five but wrote, “[W]hen The Features shine, they shine brightly. Where they fail to glisten, however, is where mediocrity takes hold.”

The same day Wilderness was released, The Features appeared for the second time on Jimmy Kimmel Live! The Features performed the song “Golden Comb” on the show.

The Features contributed an original song, “From Now On,” to the film The Twilight Saga: Breaking Dawn – Part 1, which finished the year as the third-highest grossing movie of 2011. “From Now On,” which was not included on the Wilderness album, appeared on The Twilight Saga: Breaking Dawn - Part 1 soundtrack, released in November 2011. In a review of the soundtrack, AllMusic called attention to the song, saying that it "turns that happiness [of finding a soulmate] into energetic pop.”

In 2012, The Features released their second single from the Wilderness album, “How It Starts.” That February, “How It Starts” was featured in a commercial for the 2013 Ford Mustang. The commercial, called "Mustang Inner TV", debuted on television during the broadcast of the Daytona 500. “How It Starts” also appeared in the video game Saints Row IV the following year, as well as an episode of the CW show The Vampire Diaries. “How It Starts” became the first song by The Features to make a Billboard chart, peaking at number 39 on the Alternative Songs chart.

Also in February 2012, The Features contributed an untitled original song to the film American Reunion. The unnamed song was used in one of the trailers for the film, which was part of the American Pie series. However, the song was not used in the film itself or included in the film’s soundtrack, and the full version of the song has never been released.

The Features self-released their first compilation album in 2012, entitled Still Lost: Volume 1. The ten-track album featured demos, outtakes, and alternate versions of popular and rare songs by The Features. Later that year, The Features released their third and fourth singles from the Wilderness album, “Another One” and “Kids.” In September, The Features went on a European tour, with concerts in London, Berlin, and Amsterdam.

=== The Features, Sunset Rock, and Hiatus (2013-2016) ===
While The Features were still touring to support Wilderness, they wrote and recorded another full-length album. On March 16, 2013, The Features headlined a Serpents & Snakes Showcase in Austin at the SXSW festival. Then on May 14, their fourth full-length album, self-titled The Features, was released on the Serpents & Snakes label.

Reviews of The Features album by critics were generally positive. Glide Magazine applauded the band for exploring “a more nuanced, beat influenced sound that stands in stark contrast to the more rock-oriented tracks,” while rating the album a five out of five. Consequence of Sound gave The Features a grade of B, praising the album for “combining elements of ‘80s new wave, dance, and psychedelic rock in a way that few but The Features manage to achieve.”

The first single from The Features album was “This Disorder,” which became the second Features song to make a Billboard chart. “This Disorder” peaked at number 33 on the Alternative Songs chart, making it The Features’ highest-charting single.

In 2014, The Features self-released their second compilation album, Old Familiar Melodies: 2008-2013. The ten-track album collected some of the band’s most popular songs from the Some Kind of Salvation, Wilderness, and The Features albums, and it marked the debut of “From Now On” on a Features album. On October 6, 2014, The Features self-released a single, “Good Old Days.”

The Serpents & Snakes label largely went quiet after 2014, so The Features were left to self-release their next studio album. On October 30, 2015, The Features released their fifth full-length studio album, Sunset Rock. On March 4, 2016, The Features released the first single off Sunset Rock, “Connie,” the 18th single released by The Features.

The Features played a show at the Exit/In in Nashville on July 23, 2016. After that, the group quietly disbanded, with no more new shows or songs produced for several years.

=== YK Records, The Mahaffey Sessions 1999, and Charity Reunions (2017-Present) ===
After three years of inactivity, the original lineup of The Features reunited for a one-time charity concert. Several former members of the Spongebath Records label came together on December 13, 2019, for a show at the Lindsley Avenue Church of Christ in Nashville, with proceeds to benefit The Toy Drive Before Christmas. Two original former members of The Features – guitarist Don Sergio and drummer Jason Taylor – joined lead singer Matt Pelham and bassist Roger Dabbs to perform several songs together for the first time since around The Features’ first release in 1997, The Features EP.

While The Features were with Spongebath Records, they recorded enough tracks between 1998 and 2002 to fill four albums, yet none of those albums were released at the time. One of those unreleased albums, recorded in 1999, was dubbed “The Mahaffey Sessions” after Spongebath Records producer Matt Mahaffey.

Michael Eades, the former webmaster for Spongebath Records, launched an independent label called YK Records in Nashville in 2009. By 2021, YK Records was closing in on their 100th album release. “I wanted to do something special and unexpected,” Eades said. “I shot an email to Matt Pelham as a total Hail Mary to see if he would be interested in releasing [The Mahaffey Sessions album] after all this time, and he shockingly said yes.”

Eades spent over a year acquiring the final mixes of the album produced in 1999 from Mahaffey and mastering the album into its finished form. On January 12, 2023, the sixth full-length album from The Features, titled The Mahaffey Sessions 1999, was released on YK Records.

Upon the album’s release 24 years after it was recorded, The Tennessean described it as “a great lost Nashville rock album” and stated that “The Features were the greatest rock band Nashville has ever seen.”Nashville Scene called the release “a perfect time capsule” and wrote that The Features were “one of the best bands to come out of the local scene.”

In March 2024, YK Records re-released Some Kind of Salvation with five bonus tracks. In addition to “Now You Know” and “Mosis Tosis” – which were bonus tracks on the original release LP – the 2024 re-release included the tracks “Harmless,” “Woodstock”, and “Take You On.”

Members of The Features have moved on to other projects since the band went on hiatus. Drummer Rollum Haas joined Soccer Mommy and played drums on her 2024 album, Evergreen. On June 13, 2025, lead singer Matt Pelham released his first solo album, Matt and the Watt Gives, through YK Records. The album was released along with a single, “Cutting Ties.”

In November 2025, The Features announced that they would be reuniting to co-headline a show alongside the band Glossary, for a fundraising event with proceeds to benefit Nashville public and community radio stations, specifically WXNA, WNXP, and WPLN. The show, scheduled for January 31, 2026, at the Eastside Bowl in Nashville, sold out within a day. A second show was added for January 30, and it also quickly sold out. The two fundraising events will mark the first time The Features have performed with the Sunset Rock lineup in nearly a decade.

In April 2026, YK Records re-released Exhibit A as Exhibit A (Original Sweet Tea Mix). The re-release includes sixteen bonus tracks from the Exhibit A sessions done with Brian Carter and Craig Krampf. Along with the album a music video was released for the song, "God Save Rock N' Roll". Along with the release a listening party was held at Vinyl Tap in Nashville, Tennessee. Rufus Marlow, creator of the fan site TheFeatures.Live, served as the DJ for the event.

== Discography ==
=== Studio albums ===
- Exhibit A (Universal Records, 2004; YK Records 2026)
- Some Kind of Salvation (self-released, 2008; Serpents & Snakes, 2009; YK Records, 2024)
- Wilderness (Serpents & Snakes, 2011)
- The Features (Serpents & Snakes, 2013)
- Sunset Rock (self-released, 2015)
- The Mahaffey Sessions 1999 (YK Records, 2023)

=== Extended plays ===
- The Features EP (Spongebath Records, 1997)
- The Beginning EP (self-released, 2001; Fierce Panda, 2003; Universal Records, 2004)
- Contrast EP (self-released, 2006)

=== Compilation albums ===
- Still Lost: Volume 1 (self-released, 2012)
- Old Familiar Melodies: 2008-2013 (self-released, 2014)

=== Singles ===
List of singles, with selected chart positions and certifications, showing year released and album name.

Title	Year	Peak chart positions	Album
Title	Year	US Alt	Album
"Thursday"	1999	—	Non-album single
"Buffalo Head"	2002	—	Non-album single
"The Way It's Meant to Be"	2004	—	The Beginning EP
"The Way It's Meant to Be" (Re-release)	2004	—	Exhibit A
"There's a Million Ways to Sing the Blues"	2004	—	Exhibit A
"The New Christmas Wish Book"	2004	—	Non-album single
"Leave It All Behind"	2005	—	Exhibit A
"Blow It Out"	2005	—	Exhibit A
"Late Night"	2006	—	Non-album single
"Lions"	2009	—	Some Kind of Salvation
"The Temporary Blues"	2010	—	Some Kind of Salvation
"Rambo"	2011	—	Wilderness
"How It Starts"	2012	39	Wilderness
"Another One"	2012	—	Wilderness
"Kids"	2012	—	Wilderness
"This Disorder"	2013	33	The Features
"Good Old Days"	2014	—	Non-album single
"Connie"	2016	—	Sunset Rock
"—" denotes single that did not chart or was not released in that territory.

== Music videos ==
Year	Video	Director
2003	"The Way It's Meant to Be"	
2004	"Leave It All Behind"	Saint Gorilla
2004	"A Million Ways to Sing the Blues"	Chad Denning
2005	"Blow It Out"	
2009	"Lions"	
2011	"Content"	
2012	"Another One"	Ryan Newman
2012	"How It Starts"	
2013	"This Disorder"	
2026	"God Save Rock N’ Roll"	Rory Daigle, Matt Meeks and Cody Newman
