= Texas Piano Man =

Studio album by Robert Ellis
- Released: February 14, 2019
- Length: 41:58
- Label: New West

Robert Ellis chronology
Robert Ellis (2016)	Texas Piano Man (2019)

Professional ratings
Aggregate scores
Source	Rating
Metacritic	82/100
Review scores
Source	Rating
AllMusic	4.5/5 stars
American Songwriter	3.5/5 stars
Austin Chronicle	3.5/5 stars
Paste	7.7/10

Texas Piano Man is the fifth studio album by American singer-songwriter Robert Ellis. It was released on February 14, 2019, by New West Records.

== Track listing ==
No.	Title	Length
1.	"Fucking Crazy"	3:16
2.	"When You're Away"	3:26
3.	"Nobody Smokes Anymore"	3:24
4.	"Passive Aggressive"	4:04
5.	"Father"	4:57
6.	"There You Are"	2:54
7.	"Let Me In"	4:24
8.	"Aren't We Supposed to Be in Love"	3:35
9.	"Lullaby"	5:12
10.	"He Made Me Do It"	3:42
11.	"Topo Chico"	3:04

== Charts ==
Chart (2019)	Peak position
UK Americana Albums (Official Charts)	27
UK Country Albums (Official Charts)	18
US Heatseekers Albums (Billboard)	11
US Independent Albums (Billboard)	25
