= The Way We Move =

Studio album by Langhorne Slim
- Released: 5 June 2012
- Genre: Indie rock
- Length: 41:30
- Language: English
- Label: Ramseur Records
- Producer: Kenny Siegal, Langhorne Slim & The Law

Langhorne Slim chronology
Be Set Free (2009)	The Way We Move (2012)	The Spirit Moves (2015)

Professional ratings
Review scores
Source	Rating

The Way We Move is the fifth studio album by the New York-based folk singer Langhorne Slim. It was originally crowd-funded by the artist and his band. Was selected as the Vinyl Me, Please album for January, 2013.

== Track listing ==
(From Amazon)

1. The Way We Move
2. Bad Luck
3. Fire
4. Salvation
5. On the Attack
6. Someday
7. Great Divide
8. Just a Dream
9. Song for Sid
10. Found My Heart
11. Wild Soul
12. Two Crooked Hearts
13. Coffee Cups
14. Past Lives

== Personnel ==
=== Band members ===
- Langhorne Slim – vocals, guitars
- David Moore – piano, keyboards, banjos, guitars, vocals
- Jeff Ratner – basses, vocals
- Malachi DeLorenzo – drums, percussion, vocals

=== Other crew ===
- Sam Duffy – fiddle
- Kenny Warren – trumpet
- Jeremy Viner – tenor saxophone, clarinet
- Andrew Carrico – baritone saxophone
- Sam Kulik – trombone

== Charts ==
Chart (2012)	Peak position
US Billboard 200	194
US Folk Albums (Billboard)	8
US Heatseekers Albums (Billboard)	5
US Independent Albums (Billboard)	36
