= Strawberry Mansion (album) =

Studio album by Langhorne Slim
- Released: January 29, 2021
- Length: 44:10
- Label: Dualtone

Langhorne Slim chronology
Lost at Last Vol. 1 (2017)	Strawberry Mansion (2021)	The Dreamin' Kind (2026)

Professional ratings
Aggregate scores
Source	Rating
Metacritic	84/100
Review scores
Source	Rating
American Songwriter	4.5/5 stars
Mojo	4/5 stars
Paste	7.6/10
Uncut	8/10

Strawberry Mansion is the seventh studio album by American singer-songwriter Langhorne Slim. It was released on January 29, 2021, by Dualtone Records.

== Critical reception ==
Strawberry Mansion was met with "universal acclaim" reviews from critics. At Metacritic, which assigns a weighted average rating out of 100 to reviews from mainstream publications, this release received an average score of 84 based on 5 reviews.

In a review for American Songwriter, Lee Zimmerman wrote: "By turns both heartbreaking and heroic, it boasts the signature sound of an artist whose music has always been soothing, seductive and immediately engaging. In this case, quality is matched by quantity, given the fact that the album boasts some 18 tracks (plus an added demo), each as winsome and wistful as the next." John Moore of Glide Magazine said: "What’s most surprising about this deeply personal album is just how optimistic it manages to come across. No one would begrudge Slim a double flip off, "fuck you, world!" rager after the year he had, but he opts for a solidly optimistic take on his circumstances. And right there is the obvious charm of Strawberry Mansion. Over 45 minutes, he doesn't skirt any of the hard topics." Ellen Johnson explained: "Slim finished more than 20 songs between March and May 2020, which eventually became the bones of Strawberry Mansion, the indie-folk veteran’s hopeful seventh studio album, per the press materials for the new release. Slim—beloved by Americana listeners for his frank, rugged folk songs — delivers perhaps his most serious work yet on Mansion."

Writing for Uncut, Rob Hughes stated: "Named after the area in Philadelphia where both his grandfathers were raised, it’s an album about the need to connect, not just with his muse but to anyone who may have had a similar experience. These songs feel as if they were written on the fly (which most of them were), their sense of immediacy reflected in the use of skittery acoustic guitar, banjo and rattling piano. Slim’s voice is geared to match.

== Track listing ==
Strawberry Mansion track listing
No.	Title	Writer(s)	Length
1.	"Mighty Soul"	Kenny Siegal; Langhorne Slim	1:57
2.	"Dreams"	Langhorne Slim	2:18
3.	"No Right Way"	Langhorne Slim	2:30
4.	"Lonesome Times"	Langhorne Slim	1:53
5.	"Alright to Hide"	Langhorne Slim	2:09
6.	"Panic Attack"	Langhorne Slim	2:31
7.	"Sing My Song"	Langhorne Slim	2:22
8.	"Summer Days"	Langhorne Slim	3:00
9.	"House on Fire"	Langhorne Slim	2:51
10.	"Morning Prayer"	Langhorne Slim	3:02
11.	"Colors"	Langhorne Slim	1:54
12.	"High-Class"	Langhorne Slim	2:12
13.	"Blood on Yer Lips"	Langhorne Slim	2:48
14.	"Strawberry Mansion"	Langhorne Slim	2:10
15.	"The Mansion"	Mat Davidson; Langhorne Slim	2:51
16.	"Last One Standing"	Langhorne Slim	2:13
17.	"Something Higher"	Langhorne Slim	2:34
18.	"Red Bird"	Langhorne Slim	1:32
19.	"For the Children" (Demo version)	Langhorne Slim	1:24
Total length:			44:10

== Charts ==
Chart performance for Strawberry Mansions
Chart (2021)	Peak position
US Billboard 200	6
US Americana/Folk Albums (Billboard)	9
US Top Album Sales (Billboard)	24
