= Get Damaged =

Get Damaged EP

EP by Be Your Own Pet
- Released: June 3, 2008
- Genre: Punk rock
- Length: 6:09
- Label: XL Recordings

Be Your Own Pet chronology
Get Awkward (2008)	Get Damaged EP (2008)	Mommy (2023)

Professional ratings
Review scores
Source	Rating
Allmusic	3.5/5 stars
Consequence of Sound	C–
Prefix Magazine	7.5/10

Get Damaged is a 2008 EP album by Be Your Own Pet, released by their UK label XL Recordings. It features three tracks from XL's international release of the band's second album, Get Awkward, that were removed by Universal Records (distributor for the band's US label, Ecstatic Peace) from the US version for being "too violent".

== Track listing ==
No.	Title	Length
1.	"Becky"	3:00
2.	"Black Hole"	2:25
3.	"Blow Yr Mind"	0:44
Total length:		6:09
