= And You Were a Crow =

Studio album by The Parlor Mob
- Released: March 11, 2008
- Recorded: September – October 31, 2007
- Studio: Echo Mountain Studios, Asheville, NC
- Genre: Rock and roll, hard rock, blues rock
- Length: 51:41
- Label: Roadrunner
- Producer: Jacquire King

The Parlor Mob chronology
What About Frank? (2005)	And You Were a Crow (2008)	Dogs (2011)

Singles from And You Were a Crow
- 1. "Can't Keep No Good Boy Down"; 2. "Hard Times" Released: 9 March 2009

Professional ratings
Review scores
Source	Rating
AllMusic	3.5/5 stars
Rock Sound	(8/10)
The Skinny	2/5 stars

And You Were a Crow is American rock band The Parlor Mob's debut studio album. It was recorded for over two months at Echo Mountain Recording in Asheville, North Carolina and was released digitally by Roadrunner Records on March 11, 2008. The physical CD was released in the US on May 6, 2008. The track "Can't Keep No Good Boy Down" was used as the theme song for The Paul Finebaum Show on SEC Network in 2016 and during the end credits of the season 6 Entourage episode "One Car, Two Car, Red Car, Blue Car." The track "Hard Times" is featured in the video game WWE SmackDown vs. Raw 2010 and is also featured in Nascar 09.

== Track listing ==
All tracks are written by David Rosen, Mark Melicia, Nicholas Villapiano, Paul Ritchie, and Samuel Bey, except where noted.

No.	Title	Length
1.	"Hard Times"	3:39
2.	"Dead Wrong"	3:07
3.	"Everything You're Breathing For"	3:49
4.	"The Kids"	3:47
5.	"When I Was an Orphan"	4:49
6.	"Angry Young Girl" (Justin Faircloth)	4:06
7.	"Carnival of Crows"	3:28
8.	"Real Hard Headed"	4:17
9.	"Tide of Tears"	8:35
10.	"My Favorite Heart to Break"	4:03
11.	"Bullet"	4:31
12.	"Can't Keep No Good Boy Down"	3:36

Vinyl re-release
No.	Title	Length
11.	"Mister Hey Mister"	2:43

== Personnel ==
The Parlor Mob

- Mark Melicia – lead vocals
- Paul Ritchie – guitar
- David Rosen – guitar
- Nicholas Villapiano – bass
- Samuel Bey – drums, backing vocals

Production

- Jacquire King – producer, recording engineer
- Matt Radosevich – recording engineer
- Julian Dreyer – assistant recording engineer
- Jon Ashley – assistant recording engineer
- Chris Bellman – mastering

Additional personnel

- Justin Faircloth:
  - Piano – "When I Was An Orphan", "Can't Keep No Good boy Down", "Tide of Tears"
  - Moog – "Everything You're Breathing For", "Hard Headed", "When I Was an Orphan", "Favorite Heart to Break"
  - Rhodes – "Angry Young Girl"
- Matt Radosevich
  - Acoustic guitar – "When I Was an Orphan
  - Keyboard – "Dead Wrong", "The Kids"
