= Contrast (EP) =

Contrast EP

EP by The Features
- Released: October 25, 2006
- Recorded: At Quad Studios and the LBT in Nashville, Tennessee
- Genre: pop, rock, indie
- Length: 15:34
- Producer: Jacquire King

The Features chronology
Exhibit A (2004)	Contrast EP (2006)	Some Kind of Salvation (2008)

Contrast is a five-song EP and the first release from the Tennessee-based band The Features following their departure from Universal Records. The band released the EP on their own on October 25, 2006 via their website and then later via traditional music outlets. This is also the first release to feature new keyboardist Mark Bond (formerly of Murfreesboro band De Novo Dahl) following the departure of Parrish Yaw.

== Track listing ==
All tracks are written by The Features.

No.	Title	Length
1.	"Contrast"	3:08
2.	"Wooden Heart"	3:11
3.	"I Will Wander"	2:52
4.	"Commotion"	3:29
5.	"Guillotine"	2:54

== Personnel ==
The Features

- Matt Pelham – vocals, guitar
- Rollum Haas – drums
- Roger Dabbs – bass
- Mark Bond – keyboards

Additional musicians

- Chris Carmichael – strings on "I Will Wander"
- Deanna Varagona – Bari Sax on "Wooden Heart"

Technical personnel

- Jacquire King – production, recording, mixing
- J.D. Andrew – recording
- Joshua Hood – recording assistant
- John Stinson – recording assistant
- The Features – art direction, photography
