= Frank Mighty's Hotline =

Frank Mighty
- Born: John Traboulsi
- Origin: Calgary, Alberta, Canada
- Genres: Indie rock; Neo-psychedelic
- Occupations: singer; songwriter; record producer

Frank Mighty is the stage name of John Traboulsi, a Canadian indie rock musician from Calgary, Alberta. Traboulsi released his debut single, "Intertwined" in 2019. In 2020, he released "Hold Me Down", premiering on Variance Magazine, which described his sound as "somewhere between Passion Pit and MGMT."

Wonderland drew comparisons of his music to Glass Animals and Bon Iver. His debut EP Whispersongs was released in 2021, and was mixed by Jacquire King.
