= The Dreamin' Kind =

Studio album by Langhorne Slim
- Released: January 16, 2026
- Studios: Studio Phoenix; Castle
- Length: 38:42
- Label: Dualtone
- Producer: Sam F. Kiszka

Langhorne Slim chronology
| Strawberry Mansion (2021) | The Dreamin' Kind (2026) |

The Dreamin' Kind is the eighth studio album by the American singer-songwriter Langhorne Slim. It was released on January 16, 2026, by Dualtone Records. The album was produced by Sam F. Kiszka.

== Promotion ==
The album was preceded the release of three singles. The lead single, "Dream Come True", was released on August 13, 2025. The dual second singles, "Rock N Roll" and "Haunted Man", were released on October 8, 2025, in tandem with the announcement of the album. A music video for "Haunted Man" was released on November 6, 2025. The third single, "On Fire", was released on November 16, 2025.

== Critical reception ==
Professional ratings
Aggregate scores
| Source | Rating |
|---|---|
| Metacritic | 78/100 |
Review scores
| Source | Rating |

The Dreamin' Kind was met with "generally favorable" reviews from critics. At Metacritic, which assigns a weighted average rating out of 100 to reviews from mainstream publications, this release received an average score of 78, based on 5 reviews.

In a review for No Depression, John Amen wrote that "While Slim has never sounded so polished, panoramic, or mainstream, his authenticity is never in question".

== Track listing ==
The Dreamin' Kind track listing
| No. | Title | Writer(s) | Length |
|---|---|---|---|
| 1. | "Rock N Roll" | Langhorne Slim; Hannah Wicklund; Sam F. Kiszka | 3:10 |
| 2. | "Dream Come True" | Slim; Jake Kiszka | 3:52 |
| 3. | "Loyalty" | Slim; S. Kiszka; Daniel Wagner | 2:38 |
| 4. | "On Fire" | Slim | 2:55 |
| 5. | "Stealin' Time" | Slim | 3:23 |
| 6. | "Rickety Ol' Bridge" | Slim | 2:40 |
| 7. | "Strange Companion" | Slim; S. Kiszka | 3:12 |
| 8. | "Possessive" | Slim | 2:28 |
| 9. | "Lord" | Slim | 3:26 |
| 10. | "Haunted Man" | Slim; S. Kiszka; J. Kiszka; Mat Davidson | 3:57 |
| 11. | "Dance on Thru" | Slim; J. Kiszka; Davidson; S. Kiszka; Wagner | 3:39 |
| 12. | "Engine 99" | Slim | 3:22 |
| Total length: | | | 38:42 |

== Personnel ==
Credits adapted from the album's liner notes.

- Langhorne Slim – vocals (all tracks), backup vocals (Note: Credited as part of the Dreamin' Singers.) (tracks 1, 3, 4, 7, 12), rhythm guitar (1, 3, 4), acoustic guitar (2, 6), guitar (3, 5, 7–12)
- Sam F. Kiszka – production (all tracks), bass (1–4, 6–8, 10, 12), backup vocals (1, 3, 4, 7, 12), piano (1, 7, 12), accordion (2), synthesizers (3, 7, 9), Mellotron (6, 10), organ (8)
- Daniel Wagner – backup vocals (Note: Credited individually and as part of the Dreamin' Singers.) (1–4, 7, 11, 12), percussion (1–3, 6, 11, 12), drums (1, 3, 4, 6–8, 10–12), second guitar (5), vibro guitar (6); bridge guitar, whistle (7); lead guitar (8), guitar (11), keyboards (12)
- Lance Van Dyke – engineering
- Pete Lyman – mastering
- Greg Gordon – mixing
- Casey McAllister – backup vocals (1, 3, 4, 7, 12), organ (3, 4, 10), synthesizers (3), synth bass (5)
- Cameron Neal – backup vocals (1, 3, 4, 7, 12), lead guitar (1, 4, 6), piano (1), lap steel (12)
- Goldy Miller – backup vocals (1, 3, 4, 7, 12)
- Hannah Wicklund – outro guitar (1)
- Mat Davidson – banjo, vocals (2); fiddle (5); pedal steel, backup vocals (10)
- Kristin Wilkinson – string session leader, orchestration, viola (2, 9, 11)
- David Angell – violin (2, 9, 11)
- David Davidson – violin (2, 9, 11)
- Alex Krew – cello (2, 9, 11)
- Jake Kiszka – backup vocals (2, 11), Veillete (11)
- Dan Hitchcock – saxophone (3, 7)
- Jess Wolfe – backup vocals (4)
- Omar Velasco – fiddle (8)
- Omar Ruiz-Lopez – fiddle (9)
- Alyssa Spyridon – creative direction
- Kate LaMendola – photography
- Clay Conder – layout, design
