= Lost at Last Vol. 1 =

Lost at Last, Vol. 1

Studio album by Langhorne Slim
- Released: November 10, 2017
- Length: 33:05
- Label: Dualtone

Langhorne Slim chronology
Live at Grimey's (2016)	Lost at Last, Vol. 1 (2017)	Strawberry Mansion (2021)

Professional ratings
Aggregate scores
Source	Rating
Metacritic	68/100
Review scores
Source	Rating
AllMusic	3/5 stars
Exclaim!	5/10

Lost at Last, Vol. 1 is the sixth studio album by American singer-songwriter Langhorne Slim. It was released on November 10, 2017 through Dualtone Records.

== Track listing ==
No.	Title	Length
1.	"Life Is Confusing"	2:51
2.	"Old Things"	1:46
3.	"House of My Soul (You Light the Rooms)" (featuring Kenny Siegal)	2:53
4.	"Ocean City"	2:30
5.	"Private Property"	2:02
6.	"Money Road Shuffle"	0:45
7.	"Never Break"	2:35
8.	"Bluebird"	1:54
9.	"Alligator Girl"	3:59
10.	"Funny Feelin'" (featuring Junior Kimbrough)	2:52
11.	"Zombie"	3:01
12.	"Lost This Time" (featuring Kenny Siegal)	2:18
13.	"Better Man" (featuring Kenny Siegal)	3:39

== Charts ==
Chart	Peak position
US Americana/Folk Albums (Billboard)	22
US Heatseekers Albums (Billboard)	3
US Independent Albums (Billboard)	25
