= The Features (The Features album) =

Studio album by The Features
- Released: May 14, 2013
- Genre: Indie rock, new wave
- Label: Serpents & Snakes

The Features chronology
| Wilderness (2011) | The Features (2013) | Sunset Rock (2015) |

Singles from The Features
- 1. "This Disorder" Released: 26 February 2013

The Features is the fourth studio album by American rock band The Features, which was released on May 14, 2013, on the Serpents & Snakes label.

== Track listing ==
1. "Rotten" – 3:50
2. "Tenderly" – 2:44
3. "This Disorder" – 3:06
4. "Won't Be Long" – 3:34
5. "Fox on the Run" – 4:03
6. "With Every Beat" – 4:35
7. "Ain't No Wonder" – 4:10
8. "The New Romantic" – 3:08
9. "In Your Arms" – 3:08
10. "Regarding PG" – 3:00
11. "Phase Too" – 4:43
