= Summer Sensation =

EP by Be Your Own Pet
- Released: April 18, 2006
- Genre: Punk rock
- Labels: Ecstatic Peace; Infinity Cat

Be Your Own Pet chronology
Be Your Own Pet (2006)	Summer Sensation (2006)	Get Awkward (2008)

Singles from Summer Sensation
- 1. "Bicycle, Bicycle You Are My Bicycle" Released: 2005; 2. "Girls on TV" Released: June 2006

Professional ratings
Review scores
Source	Rating
AllMusic	3.5/5 stars
Robert Christgau	(2-star Honorable Mention)
IGN	6.6/10

Summer Sensation is an EP by the punk rock band Be Your Own Pet, consisting of three songs from the "Fire Department" single and two songs from their debut album, Be Your Own Pet. The EP was released only a few weeks after their debut album.

== Track listing ==
No.	Title	Length
1.	"Bicycle, Bicycle You Are My Bicycle"
2.	"Girls on T.V."
3.	"Fire Department"
4.	"Take That Walk"
5.	"Hillmont Avenue"
