= Robert Ellis (singer-songwriter) =

American singer-songwriter

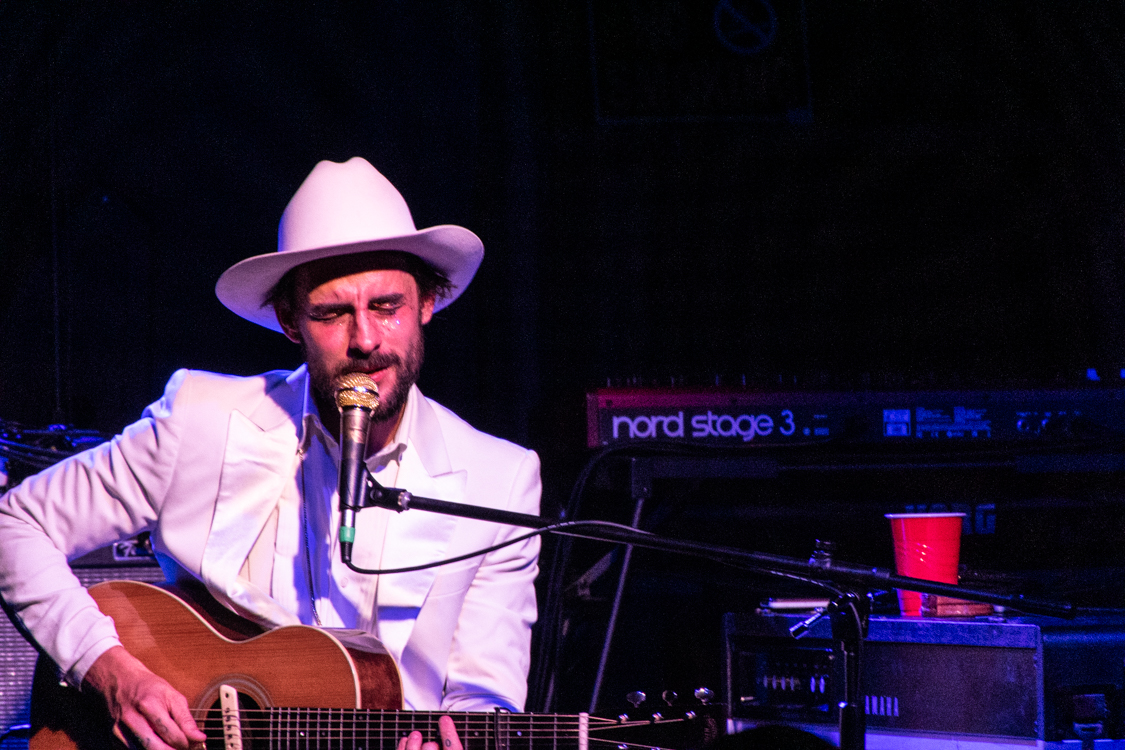
- Robert Ellis in 2019

Background information
- Born: November 6, 1988 (age 36); Lake Jackson, Texas, U.S.
- Origin: Houston, Texas, U.S.
- Genres: Country music; alternative country; rock
- Instruments: Guitar; piano
- Years active: 2010–present
- Labels: Niles City; New West
- Members: Kelly Doyle, guitar Geoffrey Muller, bass Will Van Horn, pedal steel guitar Michael "Tank" Lisenbe, drums Frank Booth, ambient room sounds
- Website: robertellis.website

Robert Ellis (born November 6, 1988) is an American singer-songwriter and multi-instrumentalist based in Fort Worth, Texas, United States, who blends country, pop music and jazz.

== History ==
Robert Ellis was born on November 6, 1988, in Lake Jackson, Texas, United States.

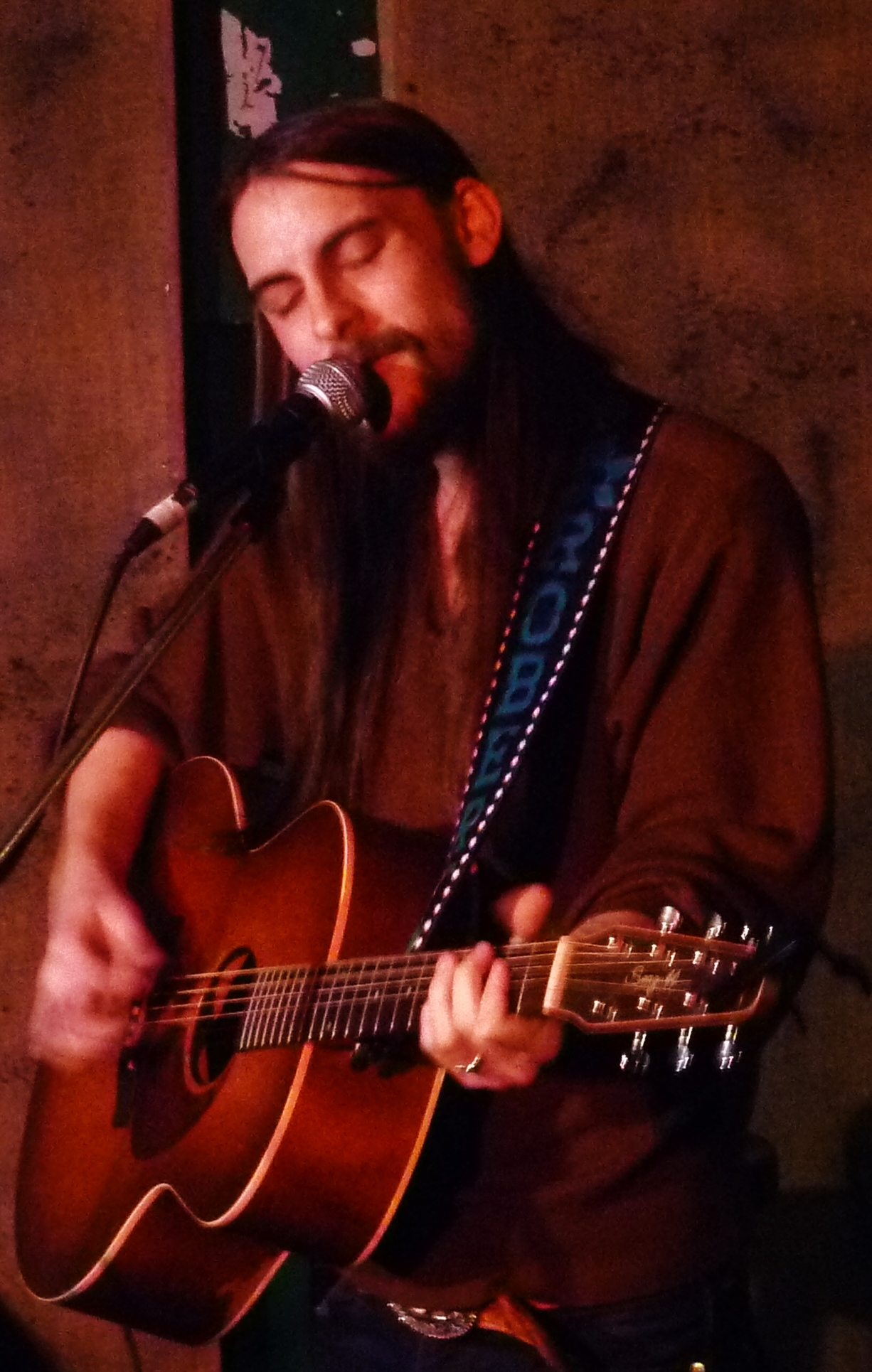
Robert Ellis in 2012

He began performing as "Eyes Like Lions" early in 2005, playing in his hometown of Lake Jackson, Texas.

The self-released LP The Great Rearranger was sold at shows, but Ellis found a higher level of success when American Songwriter magazine named his second album, Photographs, one of the top 50 albums of 2011. Robert Ellis is a New West Records recording artist. Ellis has toured with Alabama Shakes, Old Crow Medicine Show and the Old 97's. Originally from Texas, in 2012, Ellis relocated from Austin, Texas, to Nashville, Tennessee, to work on his third album, The Lights from the Chemical Plant, in Eric Masse's Casino recording studio under the direction of album producer Jacquire King. Ellis has said that this album, influenced by his hometown, Lake Jackson, Texas, incorporates more pop influences.

== Discography ==
- The Great Re Arranger (2009, self-released)
- Photographs (2011)
- The Lights from the Chemical Plant (2014)
- Robert Ellis (2016)
- Texas Piano Man (2019)
- Yesterday's News (2023)
