= Picture This (Picture This album) =

Studio album by Picture This
- Released: 25 August 2017
- Recorded: 2015–2017
- Genre: Alternative rock; indie pop; pop rock
- Length: 45:53
- Label: Republic
- Producer: Jacquire King

Picture This chronology
Picture This (EP) (2016)	Picture This (2017)	MDRN LV (2019)

Singles from Picture This
- 1. "Never Change" Released: 9 May 2017; 2. "Everything I Need" Released: 30 June 2017; 3. "95" Released: 28 July 2017; 4. "Addicted to You" Released: 18 August 2017

Picture This is the debut studio album by Irish alternative band Picture This, released on 25 August 2017, by Republic Records. The album peaked at number 1 on the Irish charts and was certified platinum.

== Track listing ==
No.	Title	Length
1.	"Take My Hand"	3:30
2.	"Dream"	3:14
3.	"You & I"	3:46
4.	"Addicted To You"	3:14
5.	"Everything I Need"	3:31
6.	"Jane"	2:42
7.	"Never Change"	4:03
8.	"Carry On"	3:38
9.	"Smell Like Him"	3:45
10.	"Let's Be Young"	3:10
11.	"95"	3:54
12.	"Difference"	3:44
13.	"Saviour"	3:45
Total length:		45:53

Deluxe edition
No.	Title	Length
14.	"Gritty Picture"	3:15
15.	"Body and Mind"	3:33
16.	"This Christmas"	3:38
Total length:		56:19

== Charts ==
=== Weekly charts ===
Chart (2017)	Peak position
Irish Albums (IRMA)	1

=== Year-end charts ===
Chart (2018)	Position
Irish Albums (IRMA)	7

Chart (2019)	Position
Irish Albums (IRMA)	24

== Certifications ==
Region	Certification	Certified units/sales
Ireland (IRMA)	Platinum	15,000^{^}
^{^} Shipments figures based on certification alone.
