= Be Your Own Pet (album) =

Studio album by Be Your Own Pet
- Released: March 27, 2006
- Genres: Noise pop, garage punk
- Length: 33:27
- Labels: XL, Ecstatic Peace!
- Producer: Steven McDonald

Be Your Own Pet chronology
Be Your Own Pet (2006)	Summer Sensation (2006)

Professional ratings
Aggregate scores
Source	Rating
Metacritic	75/100
Review scores
Source	Rating
AllMusic	3.5/5 stars
The Austin Chronicle	3.5/4 stars
Blender	4/5 stars
Entertainment Weekly	B
NME	8/10
Pitchfork	8.2/10
PopMatters	7/10
Rolling Stone	4/5 stars
The Skinny	4/5 stars
Spin	3/5 stars

Be Your Own Pet is the debut full-length album by American band Be Your Own Pet, released in the United Kingdom on March 27, 2006, and in the United States on June 6, 2006.

== Background ==
"Ouch" was inspired by George A. Romero's Dawn of the Dead. The title of the song "Thresher's Flail" is a reference to the Samuel Taylor Coleridge poem Kubla Khan: Huge fragments vaulted like rebounding hail/Or chaffy grain beneath the thresher's flail.

== Track listing ==
No.	Title	Length
1.	"Thresher's Flail"	2:07
2.	"Bunk, Trunk, Skunk"	1:28
3.	"Bicycle, Bicycle, You Are My Bicycle"	2:06
4.	"Wildcat!"	1:23
5.	"Adventure"	2:32
6.	"Fuuuuun"	1:20
7.	"Stairway to Heaven"	1:45
8.	"Bog"	2:18
9.	"Girls on TV"	2:29
10.	"We Will Vacation, You Can Be My Parasol"	2:03
11.	"Let's Get Sandy (Big Problem)"	0:58
12.	"October, First Account"	2:59
13.	"Love Your Shotgun"	3:00
14.	"Fill My Pill"	3:26
15.	"Ouch"	3:26
