= Be Your Own Pet =

American punk rock band

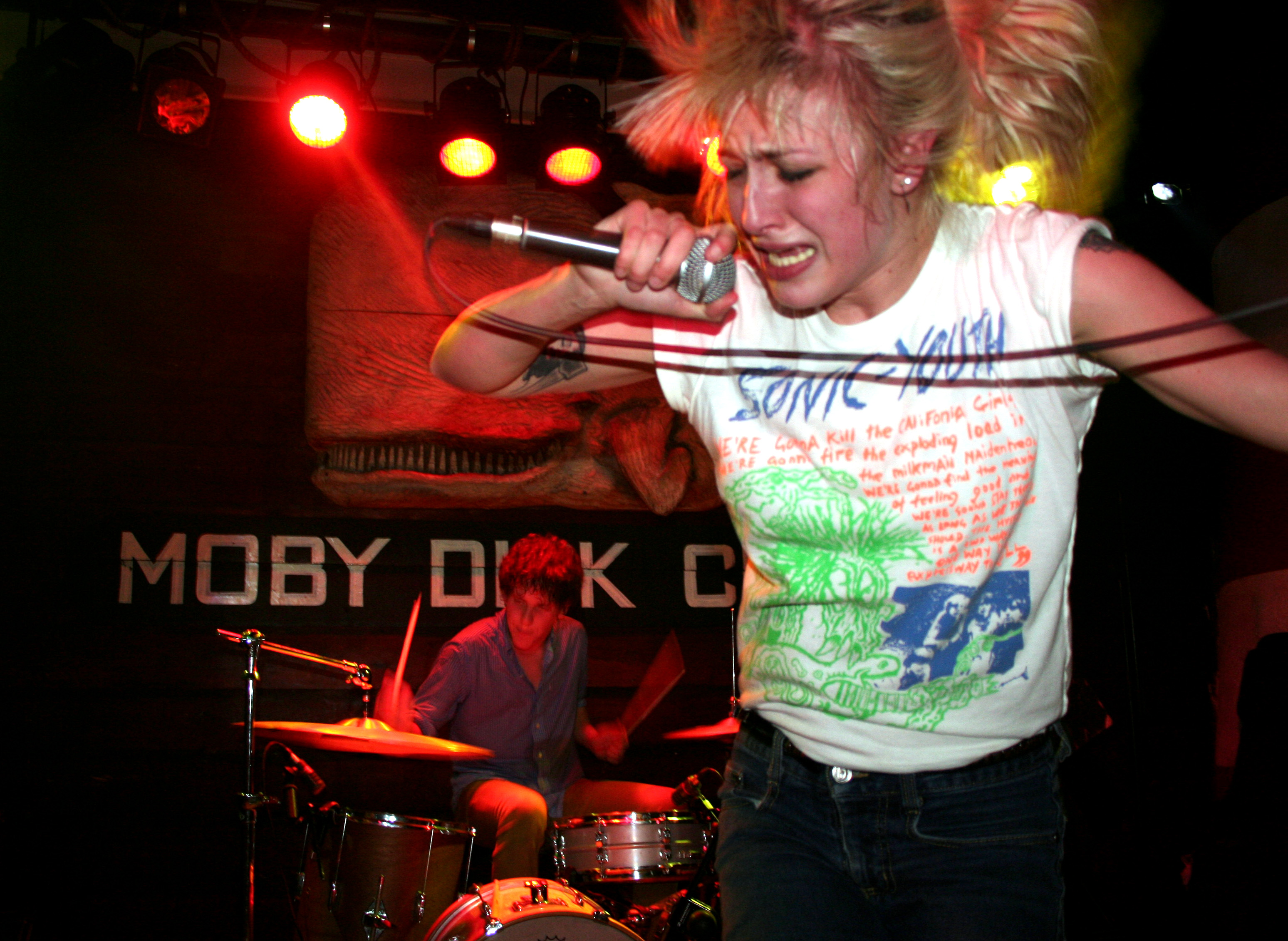
- Be Your Own Pet in 2008

Background information
- Origin: Nashville, Tennessee, U.S.
- Genres: Garage punk; garage rock; alternative rock; noise pop
- Years active: 2003–2008; 2021–present
- Labels: Infinity Cat; XL; Ecstatic Peace!; Universal; Third Man
- Members: Jemina Pearl; Jonas Stein; Nathan Vasquez; John Eatherly
- Past members: Jake Orrall; Jamin Orrall
- Website: byopband.com

Be Your Own Pet (also known as BYOP or stylised as be your own PET) is a punk/garage rock band from Nashville, Tennessee, formed in 2003. For a majority of their career, the band's line-up has consisted of lead vocalist Jemina Pearl, guitarist Jonas Stein, bassist Nathan Vasquez and drummer John Eatherly. After originally releasing early singles and EPs with Nashville-based Infinity Cat Records, the band signed to XL Recordings and Thurston Moore's label, Ecstatic Peace/Universal Records in the UK & North America respectively.

Be Your Own Pet released their self-titled debut album in 2006, receiving critical acclaim from publications such as NME and Pitchfork. Shortly following the release of their second album Get Awkward in 2008, the group disbanded, citing misogyny directed towards and experienced by Pearl and a general burnout from pressures of the music industry as the reasons for their split.

Following a fourteen year hiatus, they reunited in 2021 after being specifically requested by American musician and songwriter, Jack White to open up on a few southeastern US dates of his Supply Chain Issues Tour in support of the two studio albums he would release that year. They subsequently signed to Third Man Records (co-owned by White and Pearl's husband, Ben Swank) soon after, where the group released their third studio album, Mommy on August 25, 2023.

== Biography ==
The band formed while all members were in high school at Nashville School of the Arts. The group honed its sound playing house shows and gigs at the all-ages venues Guido's Pizza and Bongo Java. The band released their first single, Damn Damn Leash, as a CD-R; the track made its way to BBC Radio One presenter Zane Lowe, whose support for Be Your Own Pet won the band an early U.K. following. Meanwhile, attention-getting gigs at 2004's CMJ and 2005's South by Southwest began creating a buzz for the group stateside. A string of EPs followed.

BYOP performed at festivals such as Coachella, Bonnaroo, Glastonbury, and Reading & Leeds. They also supported bands such as Arctic Monkeys, Sonic Youth, Kings of Leon, amongst others.

The band received critical acclaim from Pitchfork, Rolling Stone, and many other publications such as NME, who named Pearl in the Top 10 of their annual "Cool List", and Nylon, who put the band on the cover of their summer 2006 issue. The group made their debut TV performance on Late Night with Conan O'Brien.

=== Break-up ===
On August 1, 2008, the band announced on their website that after finishing a small tour of England, they would be breaking up. The band posted the following message on their website: "To all of our fans, we are sad to bring you the news that our upcoming shows in the UK are going to be our last as a band. We thank you for all your love and support these past few years. It's been a blast, but the time has come for the four of us to go our separate ways." Their final show of their initial run was at Dingwalls in London in August 2008.

In a 10-year retrospective article for the film Scott Pilgrim vs. the World, director Edgar Wright revealed that Be Your Own Pet was originally asked to write the music for the fictional band Sex Bob-Omb, but their breakup prevented this from happening. The role was then given to Beck.

=== Post-breakup ===
Jemina Pearl released her debut solo album Break It Up on October 6, 2009, by Ecstatic Peace Records. The album was co-written with Eatherly, and featured guest appearances from Thurston Moore, Iggy Pop, Dave Sitek and Derek Stanton. During the 2010s, Pearl played in a garage-punk band called The Ultras S/C, alongside Ben Swank and Chet Weise.

Stein focused on his side project, Turbo Fruits, which released several albums after Be Your Own Pet's disbanding. Eatherly, meanwhile, played drums with bands such as The Virgins, Smith Westerns and Chairlift. He was the lead singer of the band Public Access TV, and went on to front the project Club Intl.

=== Reunion ===
In March 2022, Be Your Own Pet announced they would be reuniting to perform two concerts in April 2022 opening for Jack White's Supply Chain Issues Tour.

In March 2023, the band released the single "Hand Grenade," their first new music in 15 years. Two months later, they released second single "Worship the Whip" and announced that their first album since reuniting, titled Mommy, would be released on August 25, 2023. This was followed by a tour of the UK.

In March and April 2025, the band toured with The Linda Lindas, playing ten shows in the western United States and Vancouver, Canada.

The single "Hellbound" was released on October 29, 2026.

== Members ==
Current members

- Jemina Pearl – lead vocals (2003–2008, 2021–present)
- Nathan Vasquez – bass, backing vocals (2003–2008, 2021–present)
- Jonas Stein – guitar, backing vocals (2003–2008, 2021–present)
- John Eatherly – drums, backing vocals (2006–2008, 2021–present)

Former members

- Jake Orrall – bass (2003–2004)
- Jamin Orrall – drums (2003–2006)

Timeline

== Discography ==
=== Studio albums ===
| Title | Album details | Peak chart positions | |
| Title | Album details | UK | UK Ind. |
|---|---|---|---|
| Be Your Own Pet | Released: March 27, 2006; Label: Ecstatic Peace/Universal; Format: CD, LP | 47 | 3 |
| Get Awkward | Released: March 18, 2008; Label: Ecstatic Peace/Universal Records; Format: CD, LP | 101 | 7 |
| Mommy | Released: August 25, 2023; Label: Third Man; Format: CD, CS, LP | — | 28 |
"—" denotes a recording that did not chart.

=== EPs ===
- Extra Extra (April 20, 2005) (Infinity Cat)
- Summer Sensation (April 18, 2006) (Ecstatic Peace/Infinity Cat)
- Not Rocket Science (May 8, 2007) (Infinity Cat)
- Get Damaged (June 3, 2008) (Ecstatic Peace/XL)

=== Singles ===
| Title | Release date | | Peak chart positions | | Album |
| Title | Release date | | UK | UK Ind. | Album |
|---|---|---|---|---|---|
| "Damn Damn Leash" (Rough Trade/Infinity Cat) | | 2004 (Note: Released in 2005 in Europe and Japan.) | 68 | — | Non-album single |
| "Fire Department" (Rough Trade/Infinity Cat) | June | 2005 | 59 | — | Summer Sensation |
| "Girls on TV" (Note: Tour-only single.) (Infinity Cat) | | 2005 | — | — | Summer Sensation/Be Your Own Pet |
| "Let's Get Sandy (Big Problem)" (XL) | January | 2006 | 51 | — | Be Your Own Pet |
| "Adventure" (XL) | March | 2006 | 36 | — | Be Your Own Pet |
| "Bicycle, Bicycle, You Are My Bicycle" (Note: Download-only single.) (XL) | June | 2006 | — | — | Summer Sensation/Be Your Own Pet |
| "Food Fight!" (Note: 7" and download-only single) (XL) | March 3 | 2008 | — | 8 | Get Awkward |
| "Super Soaked" (XL) | March 3 | 2008 | — | 5 | Get Awkward |
| "The Kelly Affair" (XL) | March 10 | 2008 | — | 6 | Get Awkward |
| "Black Hole" (XL) | March 17 | 2008 | — | 5 | Get Awkward |
| "Hand Grenade" (Third Man) | March 30 | 2023 | — | — | Mommy |
| "Worship the Whip" (Third Man) | May 31 | 2023 | — | — | Mommy |
| "Goodtime!" (Third Man) | May 31 | 2023 | — | — | Mommy |
| "Big Trouble" (Third Man) | May 31 | 2023 | — | — | Mommy |
| "What a B*tch" (Third Man) | September 16 | 2025 | — | — | Non-album singles |
| "Hellbound" (Third Man) | October 29 | 2026 | — | — | Non-album singles |
"—" denotes a release that did not chart.

== Appearances ==
- SXSW (2005)
- Glastonbury Festival (2005)
- Siren Music Festival (July 16, 2005)
- Summer Sonic Festival (August 2005)
- Coachella Festival (April 30, 2006)
- Bonnaroo Music and Arts Festival 2006
- Late Night with Conan O'Brien (June 13, 2006)
- Subterranean Guide (MTV2, July 30, 2006)
- Lollapalooza 2006 (August 5, 2006)
- Reading and Leeds Festivals (2006)
- MTV Live (Canada) (June 3, 2008)
- Reading and Leeds Festivals (2008)
