= Break It Up (Jemina Pearl album) =

Studio album by Jemina Pearl
- Released: October 6, 2009
- Genre: Pop punk
- Length: 38:23
- Label: Ecstatic Peace!; Universal Motown
- Producer: John Agnello

Singles from Break It Up
- 1. "I Hate People" Released: July 24, 2009

Professional ratings
Aggregate scores
Source	Rating
Metacritic	69/100
Review scores
Source	Rating
AllMusic	3/5 stars
Pitchfork	7.0/10
Spectrum Culture	3/5
Spin	8/10

Break It Up is the first and only solo album by American musician Jemina Pearl. It was released on October 6, 2009, through Universal Motown and Ecstatic Peace! Records.

== Track listing ==
All tracks are written by Jemina Pearl and John Eatherly, with additional co-writers as noted.

No.	Title	Writer(s)	Length
1.	"Heartbeats"		2:15
2.	"After Hours"		2:49
3.	"Ecstatic Appeal"	Steve McDonald	3:34
4.	"Band on the Run"		3:03
5.	"I Hate People"	Anna Waronker	3:19
6.	"Looking for Trouble"	McDonald; Waronker	2:26
7.	"Retrograde"		3:33
8.	"Nashville Shores"		3:05
9.	"No Good"		3:03
10.	"D Is for Danger"		3:05
11.	"Selfish Heart"	Waronker
12.	"Undesirable"	Waronker	3:20
13.	"So Sick!"		2:40
Total length:			38:23

== Personnel ==
- John Angello – producer, engineer, mixing
- Greg Calbi – mastering
- John Eatherly – instrumentation
- Alfred Figueroa – overdubs
- James Frazee – assistant
- Thurston Moore – guitar, backing vocals, guest appearance
- James Pearl – vocals
- Jemina Pearl – vocals, art direction
- Iggy Pop – vocals, guest appearance
- Sandy Robertson – management
- Dave Sitek – percussion, loops, guest appearance
- Art Smith – drum technician
- Derek Stanton – guitar, guest appearance
- Ted Young – engineer
