= Some Kind of Salvation =

Studio album by The Features
- Released: September 30, 2008
- Genre: Southern rock, indie rock
- Length: 40:11 (Original); 45:14 (Original LP); 42:47 (Serpents & Snakes); 54:23 (YK Records)
- Label: Serpents & Snakes; YK Records
- Producer: Jacquire King, Brian Carter

The Features chronology
| Contrast EP (2006) | Some Kind of Salvation (2008) | Wilderness (2011) |

Singles from Some Kind of Salvation
- 1. "Lions" Released: September 2, 2009; 2. "The Temporary Blues" Released: June 21, 2010

Professional ratings
Review scores
| Source | Rating |
|---|---|
| Allmusic | 3.5/5 stars |
| PopMatters | 8/10 stars |

Some Kind of Salvation is the second full-length album from Tennessee-based band The Features. It was digitally self-released on June 23, 2008, and followed with a vinyl self-release on September 30, 2008. The album was produced by Jacquire King and Brian Carter at his Paradox Production facility in Murfreesboro, TN.

In June 2009, the band was signed to Serpents & Snakes, an imprint curated by fellow Tennessee band Kings of Leon. The album was the first official release by the new label on July 28, 2009. It was re-released under YK Records in March 2024 with five bonus tracks, including previously vinyl-only songs "Now You Know" and "Mosis Tosis."

== Original track listing ==
1. "Whatever Gets You By" – 1:16
2. "The Drawing Board" – 2:28
3. "Foundation's Cracked" – 3:01
4. "GMF (Genetically Modified Fable)" – 3:09
5. "The Temporary Blues" – 4:05
6. "Wooden Heart" – 3:13
7. "The Gates of Hell" – 4:30
8. "Still Lost" – 1:58
9. "Baby's Hammer" – 2:56
10. "Lions" – 3:36
11. "Concrete" – 2:25
12. "Off Track" – 2:59
13. "All I Ask" – 4:35

== Bonus tracks ==
1. "Now You Know" (Original LP, Serpents & Snakes, YK Records) – 2:36
2. "Mosis Tosis" (Original LP, YK Records) – 2:27
3. "Harmless" (YK Records) – 2:51
4. "Woodstock" (YK Records) – 2:49
5. "Take You On" (YK Records) – 3:29
