= Langhorne Slim =

American singer-songwriter (born 1980)

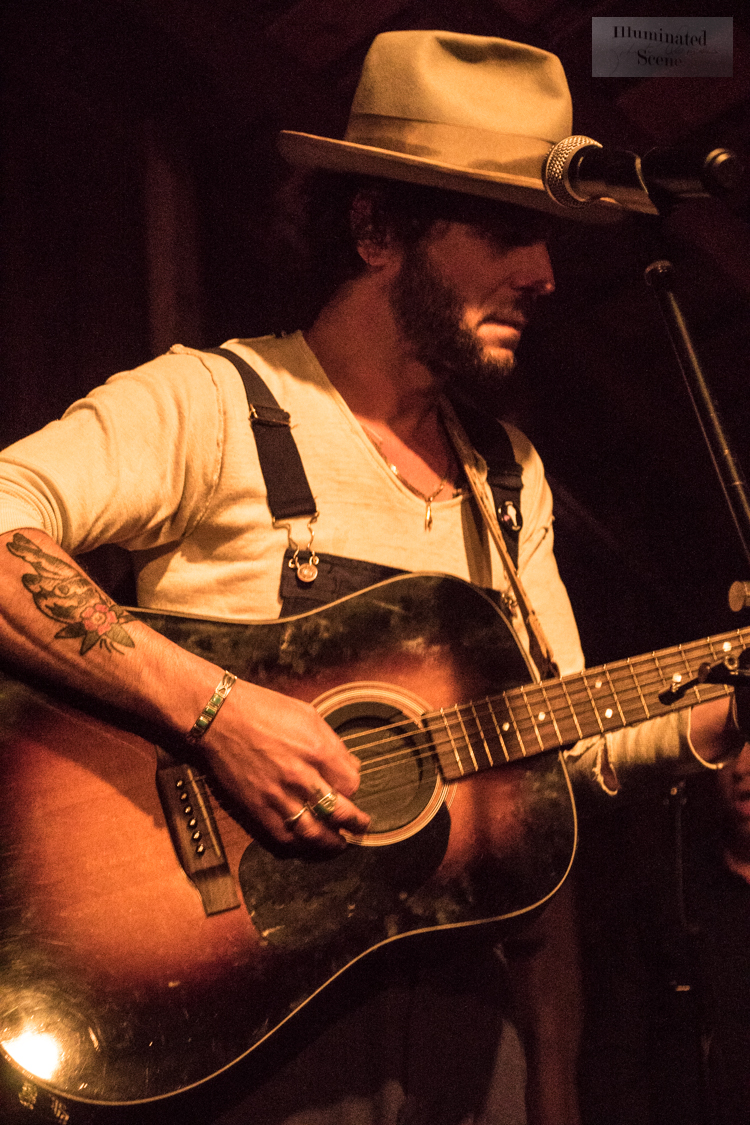
- Langhorne Slim

Background information
- Born: Sean Scolnick; August 20, 1980 (age 46); Langhorne, Pennsylvania, United States
- Genres: Americana
- Occupations: Musician, songwriter
- Instruments: Vocals, guitar, banjo, harmonica
- Years active: 1999–present
- Labels: Kemado, V2, Narnack, Ramseur, Dualtone
- Website: langhorneslimmusic.com

Langhorne Slim is an American singer-songwriter (born Sean Scolnick on August 20, 1980, in Langhorne, Pennsylvania). He attended high school at Solebury School in New Hope, Pennsylvania, and graduated from the Conservatory of Music at Purchase College, part of the SUNY system.

He began to gain public notice through several years of touring with the Trachtenburg Family Slideshow Players and an appearance at the Bonnaroo Music Festival. His song "Electric Love Letter" was chosen as number 5 on the Rolling Stone editor's top ten picks and was also in the movie Waitress. He has been seen on tours with Cake, The Avett Brothers, Murder By Death, Jeffrey Lewis, The Violent Femmes, Lucero, Rocky Votolato, the Woes, Josh Ritter, Drive-By Truckers, The Low Anthem, Old 97's, Jessica Lea Mayfield, Grace Potter and the Nocturnals, The Devil Makes Three, and The Lumineers.

== 2006–09 ==
In 2006, Langhorne Slim and the War Eagles signed to V2 Records for one EP and an LP. After the release of the Engine EP in 2006, the band signed to Kemado Records, and released a self-titled album on April 29, 2008. Slim performed the first single from the album, "Restless", on the Late Show with David Letterman in March 2008. Following the release, Slim toured the US and Europe. In the summer of 2009, Langhorne Slim began playing larger venues including the Newport Folk Festival, Bristol Rhythm & Roots Reunion, Lollapalooza, and the Philadelphia Folk Festival. The album Be Set Free was released on September 29, 2009.

On August 9, 2009, Langhorne Slim sang "God Bless America" during the seventh inning stretch during a Philadelphia Phillies-Florida Marlins game at Citizens Bank Park as WXPN's Artist to Watch and has twice been featured on the station's Free at Noon concert series.

The song "Worries" from his self titled album was featured in a Travelers Insurance commercial which launched on October 9, 2009.

== The Way We Move ==
Langhorne Slim and his band, The Law, released their fourth album, The Way We Move, on June 5, 2012, through Ramseur Records. It was recorded at Old Soul Studio, a 100-year-old Greek Revival house retooled for recording in Catskill, NY. With studio owner Kenny Siegal co-producing, 26 songs were completed in four days. The Way We Move debuted at #194 on the Billboard Top 200 chart, #159 on the Top Current Albums chart, #36 on the Independent Current Albums chart, and #5 on the Top New Artists Albums chart. It also reached the #1 spot on Amazon.com's singer-songwriter category.

The song "The Way We Move" from the album of the same name was featured in a Microsoft Windows 8 commercial. It has also been used in the movie trailer for "Admission," starring Tina Fey and Paul Rudd, and as the opening credits song in the comedy 21 & Over.

The music video for "The Way We Move" premiered on Paste Magazine's website on May 22, 2012. Langhorne Slim and The Law performed live on NPR's World Cafe session on August 2, 2012.

Langhorne Slim has been celebrated by numerous press outlets. Rolling Stone praised The Way We Move as "damn near perfect," while Laura Barton of The Guardian proclaimed the band as "one of the greatest live acts." Additionally, Entertainment Weekly called Langhorne Slim "your next obsession," and The New Yorker described him as having "Leadbelly's gift for storytelling and Dylan's ability to captivate crowds."

On March 25, 2013, Langhorne Slim & The Law performed on Conan O'Brien's late night show. Conan said, "Two months ago a friend handed me the latest album by my next guest and after one listen I became an instant almost obsessive fan. Rolling Stone described the album as 'damn near perfect.' That's a sentiment with which I wholeheartedly agree."

== The Spirit Moves ==
On August 7, 2015, Langhorne Slim & The Law released their fifth album, The Spirit Moves via Dualtone Records.

The new album was released to high praise from many media outlets, including The Boston Globe: "Slim is more reflective now, his banjo-driven rock-folk-pop hybrid increased in artistry and depth." His commitment to sobriety since his last album release is often mentioned in interviews and reviews, and has sparked lyrics evoking change as well. The Boston Globe stated, "With a high-pitched, almost Neil Young timbre to his voice, Slim sings that 'I'm going through changes now' – said changes amounting to a highly listenable rebirth." But The Guardian's Harriet Gibsone wrote "Forged in the aftershock of a series of seismic, life-altering events, Pennsylvanian songwriter Langhorne Slim’s fifth album finds him at full throttle.... For all the potency of Slim’s feelings, however, the album’s downfall is that it is musically and lyrically as well-trodden as his battered, beating heart."

On August 19, the band performed "Strangers" on Conan. Rolling Stone called the performance "jubilant," also calling the album, "A mix of soul-shout revival, Americana introspection and the Fifties-evoking jams...an artist looking forward through a fresh set of eyes.". Team Coco also premiered the official video for "Changes." The video was shot in the sanctuary of First Presbyterian Church of New Orleans and featured a new arrangement with harmony vocals from gospel singers Topsy Chapman & Solid Harmony.

On October 15, 2015, the song "Put It Together" was used in Season 11, Episode 3 of the TV series Bones ("The Donor in the Drink"). In 2016 "Put It Together" was used in a nationwide TV commercial for The Coca-Cola Company.

In 2021 the artist was part of the Newport Folk Festival in July.

== Discography ==
- Electric Love Letter, Narnack Records, 2004
- When the Sun's Gone Down, Narnack Records, 2005
- Engine EP, V2 Records, 2006
- Langhorne Slim, Kemado Records, 2008
- Be Set Free, Kemado Records, 2009
- The Way We Move, Ramseur Records, 2012
- The Spirit Moves, Dualtone, 2015
- Live at Grimey's, Dualtone Records, 2016
- Lost at Last Vol. 1, Dualtone Records, 2017
- Strawberry Mansion, Dualtone Records, 2021
- The Dreamin' Kind, Dualtone Records, 2026

== Current line-up ==
- Langhorne Slim – vocals, guitar (harmonica, piano, banjo, dancing)
- Malachi DeLorenzo – drums
- Jeff Ratner – bass
- Casey McAllister - keys, accordion
- Mat Davidson - guitar, banjo, violin

== Past members ==
- David Moore – banjo, keyboard (Amicably parted ways with the band in early August 2015)
- Paul DeFiglia – bass (Amicably left the band, in 2008, to join The Avett Brothers)
- Charles Butler (banjo); Chris Bear (saxophone, bells)
- Lane Brown (piano, Fender Rhodes piano, Hammond b-3 organ, drums)

Guest artists have appeared with Langhorne Slim on stage and in studio over the years, including the following:

- Josh Hedley (fiddle)
- Cory Younts (mandolin, OCMS)
- Seth Avett (guitar & vocals, The Avett Brothers)
- Taylor Goldsmith (guitar & vocals, Dawes)
- John McCauley (guitar & vocals, Deer Tick)
- Conan O'Brien (guitar & vocals, on stage and on his late night TV show)
