= The Beginning (EP) =

Extended play by The Features

The Beginning EP

EP by The Features
- Released: March 16, 2004
- Genre: Pop, rock, indie
- Length: 15:14 - Fierce Panda Version; 17:22 - Universal Version
- Label: Fierce Panda Records; Universal Records

The Features chronology
The Features EP (1997)	The Beginning EP (2004)	Exhibit A (2004)

Original Version Cover
- 2001 Edition

Fierce Panda Version Cover
- 2003 Edition

Singles from The Beginning
- 1. "The Way It's Meant To Be" Released: January 1, 2004

Professional ratings
Review scores
Source	Rating
Allmusic	link

The Beginning EP is the second EP released by the Tennessee-based band The Features. It was later re-released in the U.K. by Fierce Panda Records on September 22, 2003, with a different track order and different cover art. Finally, it was re-released for a second time by Universal Records in the United States on March 16, 2004. The Universal release of The Beginning featured new cover art and the same track order as the Fierce Panda release, but with the addition of the song "The Way It's Meant To Be" as a sixth track. "The Way It's Meant To Be" was included as a preview of their debut album, Exhibit A, released the following year by Universal Records.

== Original track listing ==
1. Stark White Stork Approaching
2. Walk You Home
3. Bumble Bee
4. The Beginning (Week One)
5. Two By Two

== Fierce Panda track listing ==
1. The Beginning (Week One) – 2:42
2. Walk You Home – 3:01
3. Bumble Bee – 3:39
4. Two By Two – 4:23
5. Stark White Stork Approaching – 1:29

== Standard track listing ==
1. The Beginning (Week One) – 2:42
2. Walk You Home – 3:01
3. Bumble Bee – 3:39
4. Two By Two – 4:23
5. Stark White Stork Approaching – 1:29
6. The Way It's Meant to Be – 2:08

== Personnel ==
- Matt Pelham - Vocals, guitar
- Rollum Haas - Drums
- Roger Dabbs - Bass
- Parrish Yaw - Keyboards
- Written and performed by The Features
- Tracks 1, 2 and 4 produced by Brian Carter
- Track 3 and 5 produced by Brian Owen Bottcher
- Track 6 produced by Craig Krampf
- Track 6 co-produced by Mike McCarthy and The Features

== Versions ==
- 2001, self-released, catalogue number: 04-2001
- 2003, Fierce Panda Records, catalogue number: NING146CD
- 2004, Universal Records, catalogue number: B0002088-02
