= Lindsley Avenue Church of Christ =

Historic church in Tennessee, United States

- U.S. National Register of Historic Places
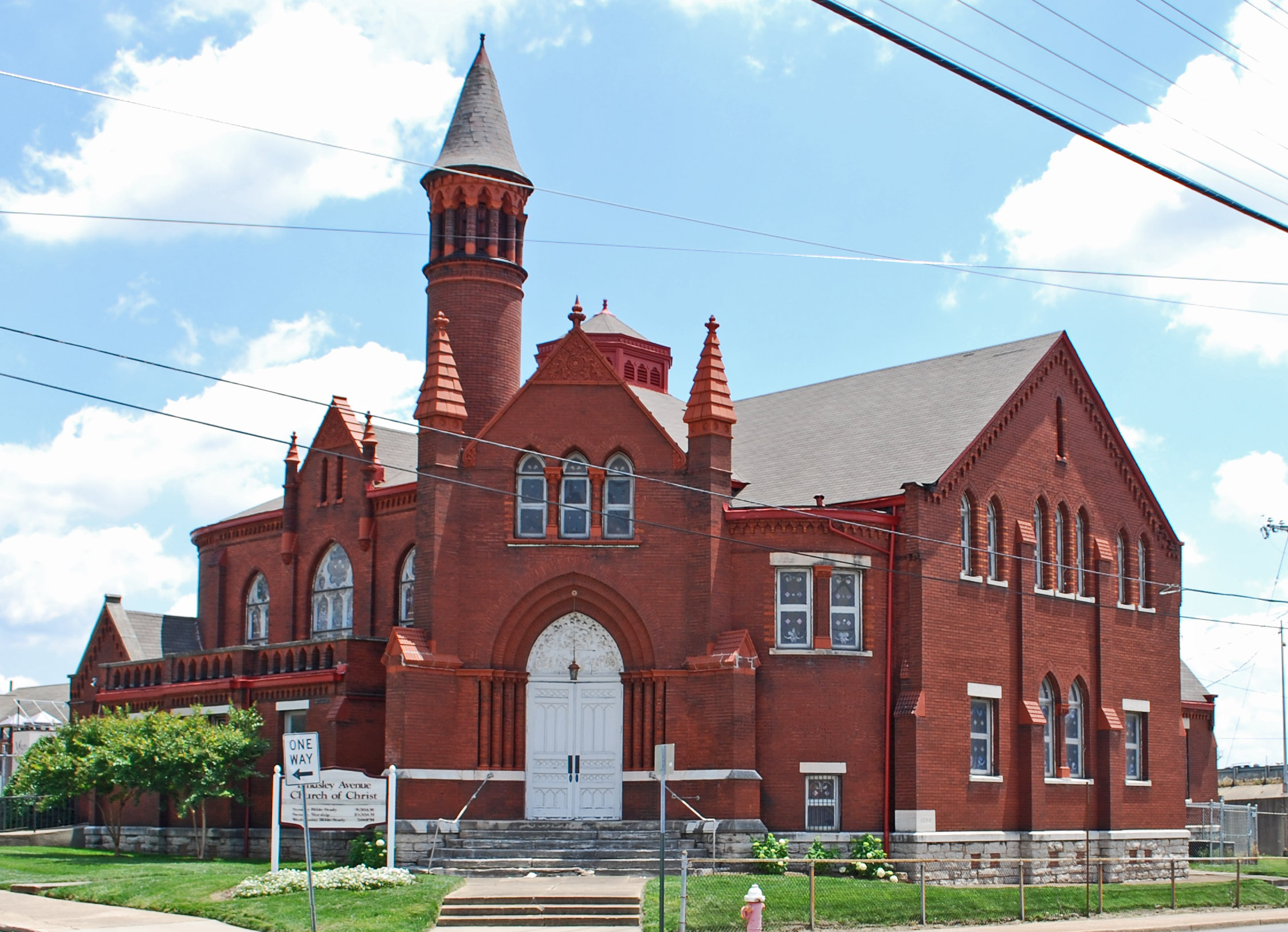

- Location within Tennessee Location within the United States
- Location: 3 Lindsley Ave., Nashville, Tennessee
- Coordinates: 36°9′8″N 86°46′7″W
- Area: 0.3 acres (0.12 ha)
- Built: 1894
- Architect: Sharp, Robert
- Architectural style: Late Gothic Revival
- MPS: Nineteenth Century Churches of South Nashville TR
- NRHP reference No.: 84003507
- Added to NRHP: May 15, 1984

Lindsley Avenue Church of Christ is a historic church at 3 Lindsley Avenue in Nashville, Tennessee. It was built in 1894 and added to the National Register in 1984. It is across the road from the Nashville Children's Theatre.

The Church was founded by David Lipscomb. Dr. Ira North was formerly a minister and eventually moved to the Madison Church of Christ. Laws Rushing II was minister for nearly a decade.

Gene Wright is the current minister of the Church. The congregation celebrates a homecoming service on the second Sunday of October every year.
