= Picture This (band) =

Irish pop rock band

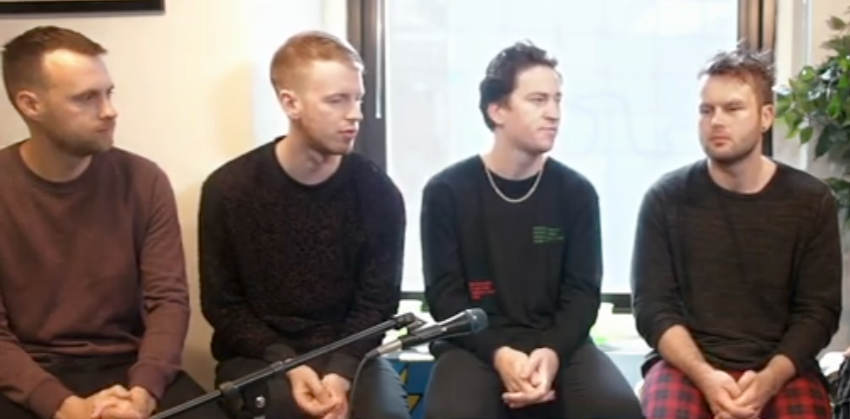
- Picture This in a 2019 interview. Left to right: Owen Cardiff, Jimmy Rainsford, Ryan Hennessy, Cliff Deane.

Background information
- Origin: Athy, County Kildare, Ireland
- Genres: Indie pop; alternative rock; pop rock
- Years active: 2015–present
- Label: Republic Records
- Members: Ryan Hennessy; Jimmy Rainsford; Owen Cardiff; Cliff Deane
- Website: picturethismusic.com

Picture This are an Irish pop rock musical band based in Athy, County Kildare, comprising Ryan Hennessy, Jimmy Rainsford, Owen Cardiff and Cliff Deane. In 2017, they released their eponymous debut album, which entered atop the Irish Albums Chart. In early 2019, they released their follow up album Mdrn Lv. Their third studio album Life in Colour was released in June 2021. On 26 April 2024 they released their fourth, Parked Car Conversations.

== Biography ==
Picture This originate from Athy, County Kildare, Ireland, originally a duo consisting of Ryan Hennessy and Jimmy Rainsford, they added Owen Cardiff and Cliff Deane in 2016.

== History ==
=== 2015–2017: Breakthrough and Picture This ===
In October 2015, Ryan Hennessy recorded a sample of the song "Take My Hand" on his iPhone, which he and Rainsford later recorded in the studio. The video was uploaded to Facebook and YouTube, and has amassed over 4 million views across all platforms. The band's debut gig was to be played in the Grand Social venue in Dublin, which they sold out in under 30 minutes. To meet the demand, the gig was moved to The Academy, which has a capacity of 850 people. The band became the first act to sell out the venue for their debut gig.

The band announced a 20-date tour of Ireland in spring 2016. The tour began in Leixlip on 4 June and culminated with three dates at the Olympia, a 1,600 capacity venue in Dublin on 1–3 November. By 22 July 2016 tickets for 16 of the shows had sold out, including two dates at the Olympia. The band later announced that they would be playing a third and final date at the Olympia on 3 November 2016.

In July 2016, the band announced that they would be releasing their debut self-titled EP on 12 August. The track list featured five original songs including "Take My Hand". The EP debuted at number 1 on the Irish Albums Chart for the week ending 18 August 2016.

In May 2017, Picture This released "Never Change", the lead single from their debut studio album. Rainsford told Billboard the song was inspired by "the feeling of loving somebody exactly how they are and never wanting them to change a thing. The video signifies that we could go anywhere in the world but we always end up back home and will never change that."

They released their self-titled debut album on 25 August 2017. It ended up topping the IRMA charts in Ireland.

=== 2018–present: Mdrn Lv and Life in Colour ===
On 23 March 2018, Picture This released "This Morning". On 15 June 2018, they released "When We Were Young". On 17 October 2018, they announced their second album, Mdrn Lv, and released its lead single, "One Drink". Following the release, they also announced their second headline tour. On 7 December 2018, they released the second single from Mdrn Lv, "Everything or Nothing". The album was released on 19 February 2019, with a performance atop the Empire State Building in New York City. On 18 October 2019 they released their single "One Night". On 19 October they announced three concert dates in Ireland in Cork, Dublin and Belfast for June 2020.

In June 2021, the band released their third studio album, Life in Colour, which includes the single "LA House Party". The album debuted at number 2 on the Irish Albums Chart.

In October 2025, they released the song "Heart Over Head" with German musician JORIS, who published the song in German ("Herz Über Kopf") ten years prior with large success.

== Band members ==
- Ryan Hennessy – vocals (2015–present)
- Jimmy Rainsford – drums (2015–present)
- Owen Cardiff – guitar (2016–present)
- Cliff Deane – bass (2016–present)

== Discography ==
=== Studio albums ===
Title	Album details	Peak chart positions	
Title	Album details	IRE	UK
Picture This	Released: 25 August 2017; Label: Picture This Music, Republic (0190295781637); Formats: CD, LP, DD, streaming	1	—
Mdrn Lv	Released: 15 February 2019; Label: Republic (00602577242977); Format: CD, LP, DD, streaming	1	54
Life in Colour	Released: 25 June 2021; Label: Let's Get It, Republic (3832728); Format: CD, LP, DD, streaming	2	51
Parked Car Conversations	Released: 26 April 2024; Label: RCA, Sony; Format: CD, LP, DD, streaming	2	74

=== Extended plays ===
Title	Extended play details	Peak chart positions
Title	Extended play details	IRE
Picture This	Released: 12 August 2016; Label: Picture This Music, Warner Music Ireland; Formats: CD, DD, streaming	1
Let the Light In	Released: 6 June 2025; Label: Hansa, Sony; Formats: Streaming	—

=== Singles ===
Title	Year	Peak chart positions				Sales	Album
Title	Year	IRE	GER Air.	LTU Air.	UK	Sales	Album
"Take My Hand"	2015	21	—	*	—	IRE: 10,000	Picture This (EP)
"You & I"	2016	48	—	—	—		Picture This (EP)
"Let's Be Young"	2016	66	—	—	—		Picture This (EP)
"This Christmas"	2016	25	—	—	—		Non-album single
"Never Change"	2017	30	—	—	—		Picture This
"Everything I Need"	2017	72	—	—	—		Picture This
"95"	2017	61	—	—	—		Picture This
"Addicted to You"	2017	22	—	—	—		Picture This
"This Morning"	2018	6	—	—	—		Non-album singles
"When We Were Young"	2018	28	—	—	—		Non-album singles
"One Drink"	2018	12	—	—	98		Mdrn Lv
"Everything or Nothing"	2018	7	—	—	—		Mdrn Lv
"If You Wanna Be Loved"	2019	18	—	—	—		Mdrn Lv
"Modern Love"	2019	23	—	—	—		Mdrn Lv
"One Night"	2019	4	—	—	—		Non-album singles
"This Christmas" (Orchestral Version)	2019	—	—	—	—		Non-album singles
"Winona Ryder"	2020	20	—	—	—		Life in Colour
"Troublemaker"	2020	38	—	—	—		Non-album singles
"If I Build a Home on the Moon"	2020	23	—	—	—		Non-album singles
"Unconditional"	2020	17	—	—	—		Life in Colour
"Things Are Different"	2021	16	—	—	—		Life in Colour
"LA House Party"	2021	20	—	—	—		Life in Colour
"Heart's Not In It" (with Loote)	2021	—	—	—	—		Non-album single
"If Ever However Whenever Forever"	2021	49	—	—	—		Life in Colour
"Get on My Love"	2022	38	—	—	—		Parked Car Conversations
"Song to Myself"	2023	31	—	—	—		Parked Car Conversations
"Ireland"	2023	—	—	—	—		Red Lights / Ireland
"Leftover Love"	2023	65	—	—	—		Parked Car Conversations
"Call It Love"	2023	78	—	—	—		Parked Car Conversations
"Act of Innocence"	2024	71	—	—	—		Parked Car Conversations
"Somewhere Close to Heaven" (with Rea Garvey)	2024	—	—	—	—		Halo
"Parked Car Conversations"	2024	87	—	—	—		Parked Car Conversations
"Satellites"	2024	—	—	—	—		Non-album singles
"Middle of Love" (with Dean Lewis)	2024	97	—	—	—		Non-album singles
"Drink It Down to There"	2024	—	—	—	—		Non-album singles
"Let's Try Love"	2025	—	—	—	—		Let the Light In
"A Thousand Times"	2025	—	—	—	—		Let the Light In
"Giants" (with Michael Schulte)	2026	—	44	77	—		Beautiful Reasons
"—" denotes a recording that did not chart or was not released in that territory. "*" denotes that the chart did not exist at that time.

=== Other charted songs ===
Year	Title	Peak chart positions	Album
Year	Title	IRE	Album
2017	"Smell Like Him"	73	Picture This
2017	"Jane"	81	Picture This
2017	"Carry On"	82	Picture This
2017	"Dream"	92	Picture This
2017	"Saviour"	97	Picture This
2017	"Body and Mind"	62	Picture This
2019	"Nevada"	93	Mdrn Lv
2019	"Hurt Nobody"	52	Mdrn Lv
2021	"Addict of Magic"	10	Life in Colour
2021	"Die for You"	49	Life in Colour

== See also ==
- Music of Ireland
