= Exhibit A (album) =

Studio album by the Features
- Released: September 14, 2004
- Recorded: May 1 – June 1, 2003
- Studio: Sweet Tea (Oxford, Mississippi)
- Genre: Pop; rock; indie
- Length: 32:38 (US edition); 38:19 (UK edition)
- Label: Universal
- Producer: Craig Krampf; Mike McCarthy (co.); The Features (co.)

The Features chronology
The Beginning EP (2001)	Exhibit A (2004)	Contrast EP (2006)

Alternative cover
- UK edition cover

Alternative cover
- Original Sweet Tea Mix cover

Singles from Exhibit A
- 1. "The Way It's Meant to Be" Released: March 1, 2004; 2. "There's a Million Ways to Sing the Blues" Released: May 6, 2004; 3. "Leave It All Behind" Released: January 25, 2005; 4. "Blow It Out" Released: April 11, 2005

Exhibit A is the major label debut LP album from Tennessee-based band the Features. It was released on September 14, 2004. The UK edition features alternative cover art and two bonus tracks: "Kari-Ann" and "Dark Room".

Professional ratings
Review scores
Source	Rating
AllMusic	3.5/5 stars

== Original Track listing ==
1. "Exhibit A" – 2:05
2. "The Way It's Meant to Be" – 2:07
3. "Me & the Skirts" – 2:30
4. "Blow It Out" – 3:00
5. "There's a Million Ways to Sing the Blues" – 2:17
6. "Leave It All Behind" – 2:28
7. "Exorcising Demons" – 3:21
8. "The Idea of Growing Old" – 3:12
9. "Some Way Some How" – 3:11
10. "Situation Gone Bad" – 2:43
11. "Harder to Ignore" – 2:24
12. "Circus – 3:20

== UK CD Bonus Tracks ==
13. "Kari-Ann" – 2:55
14. "Dark Room" – 2:46

== Original Sweet Tea Mix Bonus Tracks ==
13. "Exhibit B" – 0:52
14. "Exhibit A (Brian Carter Demo)" - 2:15
15. "The Way It's Meant To Be (Brian Carter Demo)" - 2:09
16. "Someway, Somehow (Craig Krampf & Mike Poole Demo)" - 3:10
17. "Me & The Skirts (Brian Carter Demo)" - 2:44
18. "There's A Million Ways To Sing The Blues (Brian Carter Demo)" - 2:08
19. "Buffalo Head (Craig Krampf & Mike Poole Demo)" - 3:14
20. "God Save Rock N' Roll (Brian Carter Demo)" - 2:23
21. "Body Mind Spirit Mullet" - 0:51
22. "The Beginning" - 2:37
23. "See You Through" - 2:47
24. "God Save Rock N' Roll" - 2:36
25. "Action (Brian Carter Demo)" - 3:20
26. "Bring On The Night (Craig Krampf & Mike Poole Demo)" - 2:38
27. "Look Out Below (Brian Carter Demo)" - 2:33
28. "Leave It All Behind (Acoustic Brian Carter Demo)" - 3:03

== Personnel ==
Credits adapted from the Exhibit A liner notes.

The Features

- Matt Pelham – vocals, guitar
- Rollum Haas – drums
- Roger Dabbs – bass
- Parrish Yaw – keyboards}}

Production

- Craig Krampf – producer
- Mike McCarthy – co-producer, recording
- Sean Macke and Dawn Palmetto – recording assistants
- David Thoener – mixing
- Vance Powell – mixing assistant
- George Marino – mastering
- Mr. Scott Design – art direction
- Tom Burns and Jim Valosik – artwork
- Piper Ferguson – photography
