= The Parlor Mob =

US musical group

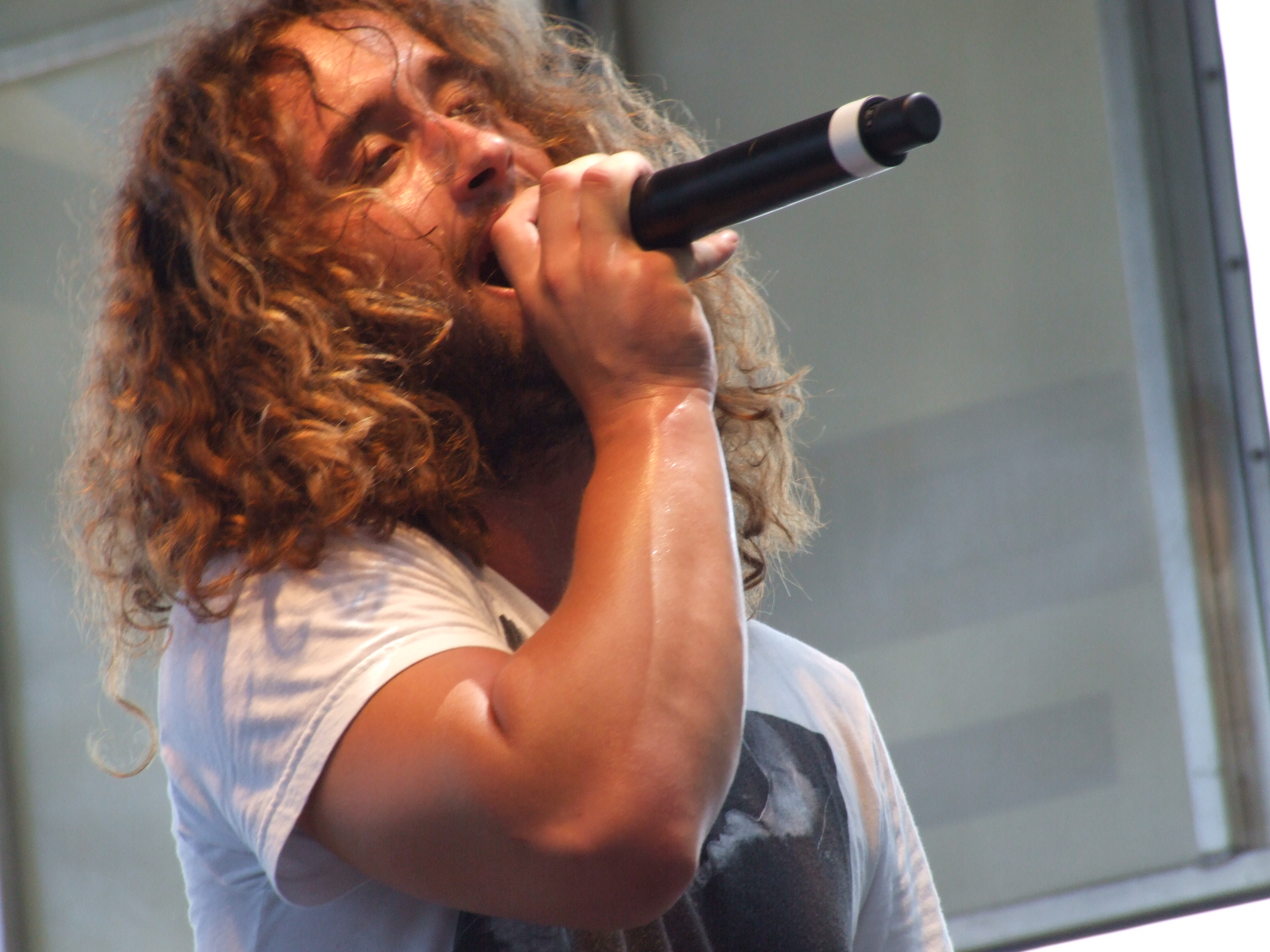
- Mark Melicia at Lollapalooza 2008.

Background information
- Origin: Asbury Park, New Jersey, U.S.
- Genre: Hard rock
- Years active: 2004–present
- Label: Roadrunner
- Members: Sam Bey; Mark Melicia; Paul Ritchie; Gianni Scalise
- Past members: Anthony Chick; Augustus Moore; David James Rosen; Nick Villapiano
- Website: http://www.parlormob.com

The Parlor Mob is an American rock band from New Jersey.

== History ==
=== Formation and Capitol Records ===
The original members of the band formed in 2004, as What About Frank?. They independently released an album in 2005, entitled "What about Frank?". The band won the title Best Live Band at the Asbury Park Music Awards twice, and performed at the 2005 Van's Warped Tour, the Bamboozle festival and the CMJ Music Marathon. This attracted the attention of Capitol Records. In 2006, they changed their name to The Parlor Mob, named after a notorious Hell's Kitchen gang active at the turn of the 20th century. A 2006 editorial in The New York Times notes "when you're not even halfway through your 20s, jump-starting a back-to-basics rock revolution seems a tall order," adding "judging by the rock 'n' roll charisma radiated by the band members at their live shows–long hair tossing, instrument abusing, generally reckless affairs[;] they are up to the task." They recorded a four-song EP for Capitol, but the band was dropped in the wake of a corporate merger between Capitol and Virgin Records. They chose to give away the EP for free, eventually attracting the attention of Roadrunner Records, with whom the band signed a record deal in 2007.

=== And You Were a Crow ===
Producer Jacquire King, who had previously contacted the band while they were recording for Capitol, contacted Roadrunner to express his interest in producing the band's new record. King describes The Parlor Mob as "very much a live rock 'n' roll band," adding "in my eyes they are an important band, and I do feel they can be the same for the public... I think they are an important link to what is the essence of rock 'n' roll and what is to become a modern expression of it." On 28 September 2007, the band began recording at Echo Mountain Recording Studio. And You Were a Crow was completed on Halloween of 2007, and released digitally on 11 April 2008, and on compact disc on 6 May 2008. The band was featured on the iTunes Store's section of best new rock artists in 2008. The lead single "Can't Keep No Good Boy Down" was featured in the sixth season of the television show, Entourage. As additional promotion for the record, the Parlor Mob was featured in a performance setting on Knight Rider, in October 2008. The song "Hard Times" reached No. 35 on the Billboard rock charts. It was featured in the video games NASCAR 09 and WWE SmackDown vs. Raw 2010, and the television shows Friday Night Lights and Trauma.

Aaron Miller of CityNews described their 2009 performances at Bovine Sex Club as "face-melting, Fender-shredding rock out that went a long way in clearing up why some have dubbed this a 'must-see' live band[;] nobody who watches them perform live will fail to be entertained. The Aquarian Weekly also expressed "basically now is the time to go see them and say later on, "Yeah, you know, I saw them back before they took over the world," because that's the way things are heading."

=== Dogs ===
During the Winter of 2009, Nick Villapiano left The Parlor Mob and began playing with Atlantic, Atlantic, and their friend bassist Anthony Chick joined the band. They announced Matt Radosevich, who engineered the first record, was producing the album.

On 22 August 2011, The Parlor Mob released the single "Into the Sun." The full album entitled Dogs was released on 11 October 2011. The band explains the name of the album was chosen because "it is a personification of everything we all have become and a wide reaching, never-ending analogy for what we currently feel; a unified stamp of our lives in this moment." They continue "we have been beaten to the ground, spit on and kicked, and we have bitten back and clawed at those who are against us. We have felt caged. We have been hungry and fought for scraps. We have been pet and praised in one instant, and neglected and abused in the next. We have formed a pack, and we are fiercely loyal to one another." A special edition was also released featuring 3 bonus tracks.

Dogs was named iTunes' "Rock Album of the Year." Brice Ezell of PopMatters calls the album "high-octane, distortion-fueled rock 'n' roll from start to finish." Dogs reached No. 5 on Top Heatseekers, and the single "Into The Sun" made Billboard Rock Chart's Top 40, and was also used by the professional ice hockey team the Pittsburgh Penguins, for a nationwide playoff ad campaign. Songs from Dogs appear in the video games Sleeping Dogs, DiRT: Showdown, and MLB 12: The Show, and the television shows Person of Interest and Prime Suspect. In December 2012, The Parlor Mob began what would be a year and a half hiatus.

=== End of hiatus and Cry Wolf ===
On 9 June 2014, The Parlor Mob announced via Facebook they would be releasing the EP Cry Wolf later that fall, along with the immediate release of the first single titled "The Day You Were Born." The EP came out 17 February 2015, featuring tracks "The Day You Were Born," "Dead Man," "Doe Eyed Dear," "Racing with a Beating Heart" and the titular "Cry Wolf." Despite containing five songs, the album clocks in just shy of 30 minutes. The album was later released on vinyl by In the Clouds Records.

On 22 June 2018, Pitchfork announced that The Parlor Mob signed with Britannia Row Recordings, run by Malay. They released the song "Fourth of July," which Alternative Addiction describes as "anthemic."

=== Dark Hour ===
On August 16, 2019, the band released Dark Hour, their fifth album. The band went on a multi-city headlining tour that began on September 28, 2019.

== Members ==
- Sam Bey – drums
- Mark Melicia – vocals
- Paul Ritchie – guitar
- Gianni Scalise – bass

== Discography ==
Albums

- What About Frank? (2005)
- And You Were a Crow (2008)
- Dogs (2011)
- Dark Hour (2019)

EPs

- The Parlor Mob (2006)
- Cry Wolf (2015)
- Back in '06 (2024)

Singles

Year	Single	Peak chart positions	Album
Year	Single	US Main.	Album
2008	"Can't Keep No Good Boy Down"	—	And You Were a Crow
2009	"Hard Times"	35	And You Were a Crow
2011	"Into the Sun"	—	Dogs
2012	"Fall Back"	—	Dogs
2014	"The Day You Were Born"	—	Cry Wolf EP
