= Jemina Pearl =

American singer, frontwoman of Be Your Own Pet

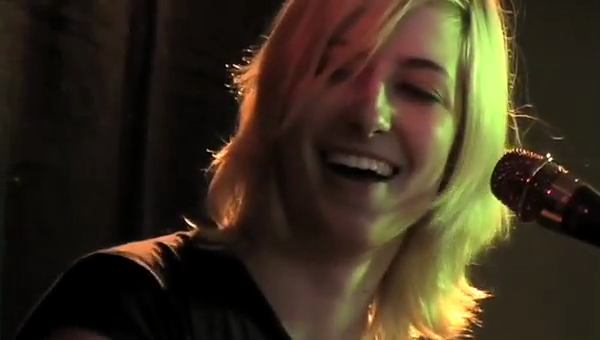

Background information
- Also known as: Jemina Pearl Abegg
- Born: June 20, 1987 (age 39); Sacramento, California, U.S.
- Genres: Punk rock, alternative rock, garage rock
- Occupation: Singer
- Years active: 2005–2013, 2021–present
- Labels: Ecstatic Peace, Universal
- Member of: Be Your Own Pet
- Formerly of: Ultras S/C

Jemina Pearl Abegg (born June 20, 1987) is an American singer and the frontwoman of Be Your Own Pet, a punk rock band she started when she was 16.

== Biography ==
She is the daughter of musician/artist Jimmy Abegg. She appeared in the television series Gossip Girl, in a musical performance with Thurston Moore, covering the Ramones classic "Sheena Is a Punk Rocker". Her debut solo album, Break It Up, was released on October 6, 2009. The album, co-written by John Eatherly, was released on Ecstatic Peace, and features guest appearances by Thurston Moore, Iggy Pop, Dave Sitek, and Derek Stanton of Awesome Color.

From 2012 to 2013, she was part of a band called Ultras S/C with Chetley "Cheetah" Weise and Ben Swank, which opened for The Pine Hill Haints. In December 2021, Be Your Own Pet reunited, with Jemina participating in the reunion.
