= Get Awkward =

Studio album by Be Your Own Pet
- Released: March 18, 2008
- Genre: Garage punk, noise pop, hardcore punk
- Length: (US Version) 29:28 (UK Version) 35:37
- Label: XL Recordings, Ecstatic Peace
- Producer: Steven McDonald

Be Your Own Pet chronology
Not Rocket Science (2007)	Get Awkward (2008)	Get Damaged EP (2008)

Professional ratings
Aggregate scores
Source	Rating
Metacritic	70/100
Review scores
Source	Rating
AllMusic	3.5/5 stars
Drowned In Sound	5/10
MSN Music (Consumer Guide)	A−
musicOMH	4/5 stars
NME	4/5 stars
Pitchfork	7.8/10
PopMatters	6/10
Rolling Stone	4/5 stars
The Skinny	2/5 stars
URB	3/5 stars

Get Awkward is the second album by Be Your Own Pet. It was released on March 18, 2008. Rolling Stone listed the album as the 45th best of 2008.

== UK track listing ==
No.	Title	Length
1.	"Super Soaked"	2:34
2.	"Black Hole"	2:25
3.	"Heart Throb"	2:12
4.	"Becky"	3:00
5.	"The Kelly Affair"	2:32
6.	"Twisted Nerve"	3:03
7.	"Blow Yr Mind"	0:44
8.	"Bummer Time"	1:59
9.	"Bitches Leave"	2:25
10.	"You're a Waste"	2:38
11.	"Food Fight!"	1:05
12.	"Zombie Graveyard Party!"	2:03
13.	"What's Your Damage?"	2:19
14.	"Creepy Crawl"	2:51
15.	"The Beast Within"	3:54

== US track listing ==
Three tracks—"Black Hole", "Becky" and "Blow Yr Mind"—were removed by Universal lawyers for being "too violent". They were later released in the US on the EP Get Damaged.

No.	Title	Length
1.	"Super Soaked"	2:34
2.	"The Kelly Affair"	2:32
3.	"Twisted Nerve"	3:03
4.	"Heart Throb"	2:12
5.	"Bitches Leave"	2:25
6.	"Bummer Time"	1:59
7.	"You're a Waste"	2:38
8.	"Food Fight!"	1:05
9.	"Zombie Graveyard Party!"	2:03
10.	"What's Your Damage?"	2:19
11.	"Creepy Crawl"	2:51
12.	"The Beast Within"	3:54
