= List of awards and nominations received by Maluma =

Maluma awards and nominations
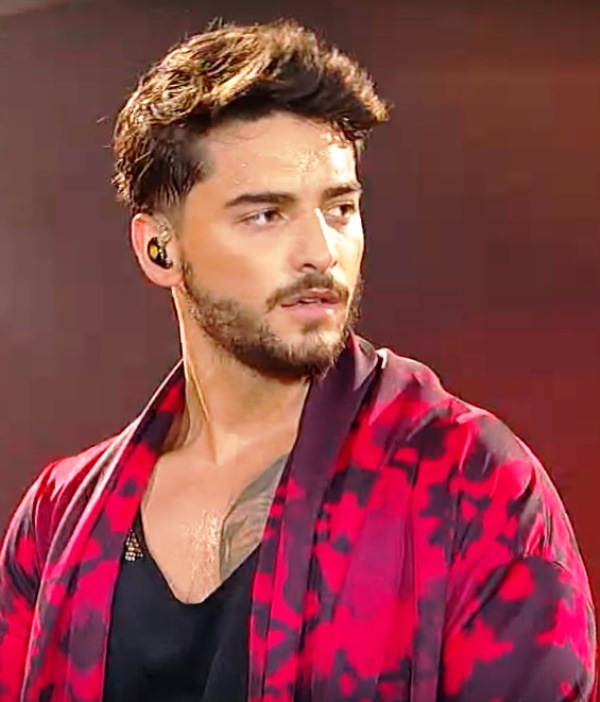
- Maluma in 2017
Awards and nominations
Award	Wins	Nominations
Grammy	0	3
MTV Europe	2	3
MTV VMA	1	4
Latin Grammy Awards	1	10
Billboard Music Awards	0	3
MTV Millennial Awards	3	13
LOS40 Music Awards	5	14
Premios Tu Mundo	0	1
Lo Nuestro Awards	3	20
Premios Nuestra Tierra	1	19
Premios Shock	5	13
E! Latino	1	1
Kids' Choice Awards	0	3
Kids' Choice Awards Colombia	4	5
Premios TVyNovelas	1	1
Latin American Music Awards	2	10
Heat Latin Music Award	1	7
Billboard Latin Music Awards	1	15

Totals (Note: Certain award groups do not simply award one winner. They acknowledge several different recipients, have runners-up, and have third place. Since this is a specific recognition and is different from losing an award, runner-up mentions are considered wins in this award tally. For simplification and to avoid errors, each award in this list has been presumed to have had a prior nomination.)
- Wins: 79
- Nominations: 277

The following is a list of awards and nominations received by Colombian rapper singer and songwriter Maluma. He has released four studio albums. Maluma has won one Latin Grammy Award from eleven nominations, as well as an MTV Video Music Award, three MTV Europe Music Awards, and two Latin American Music Awards. He received the Spirit of Hope award at the 2020 Billboard Latin Music Awards for his foundation El Arte de los Sueños (The Art of Dreams).

He won the Latin Grammy Award for Best Contemporary Pop Vocal Album for his third studio album F.A.M.E. (2018). His fourth studio album 11:11 (2019) was nominated for Best Latin Pop Album at the 62nd Annual Grammy Awards. In 2019, he received the ASCAP Latin award for Songwriter of the Year.

== Awards and nominations ==
Award	Year	Recipient(s) and nominee(s)	Category	Result	Ref.
American Music Awards	2021	Himself	Favorite Latin Male Artist	Nominated	
American Music Awards	2021	"Hawái" (Remix) (with The Weeknd)	Favorite Latin Song	Nominated	
American Music Awards	2021	Papi Juancho	Favorite Latin Album	Nominated	
ASCAP Latin Awards	2015	"La Temperatura" (with Eli Palacios)	Most Performed Urban Songs	Won	
ASCAP Latin Awards	2017	"Desde Esa Noche" (with Thalía)	Most Performed Pop Songs	Won	
ASCAP Latin Awards	2017	"Vente Pa' Ca" (with Ricky Martin)	Most Performed Pop Songs	Won	
ASCAP Latin Awards	2017	"El Perdedor" (with Yandel)	Most Performed Urban Songs	Won	
ASCAP Latin Awards	2018	"Chantaje" (with Shakira)	Most Performed Pop Songs	Won	
ASCAP Latin Awards	2018	"Felices Los 4"	Most Performed Urban Songs	Won	
ASCAP Latin Awards	2018	"Sin Contrato" (with Fifth Harmony)	Most Performed Urban Songs	Won	
ASCAP Latin Awards	2019	Himself	Songwriter of the Year	Won	
ASCAP Latin Awards	2019	"Amigos Con Derechos" (with Reik)	Most Performed Songs	Won	
ASCAP Latin Awards	2019	"Mala Mía"	Most Performed Songs	Won	
ASCAP Latin Awards	2019	"El Préstamo"	Most Performed Songs	Won	
ASCAP Latin Awards	2019	"Corazón" (with Nego do Borel)	Most Performed Songs	Won	
ASCAP Latin Awards	2019	"Clandestino" (with Shakira)	Most Performed Songs	Won	
ASCAP Latin Awards	2020	"11 PM"	Most Performed Songs	Won	
ASCAP Latin Awards	2020	"Créeme" (with Karol G)	Most Performed Songs	Won	
ASCAP Latin Awards	2020	"HP"	Most Performed Songs	Won	
ASCAP Latin Awards	2021	"ADMV"	Most Performed Songs	Won	
ASCAP Latin Awards	2021	"Hawái"	Most Performed Songs	Won	
ASCAP Latin Awards	2021	"Qué Pena" (ft J Balvin)	Most Performed Songs	Won	
ASCAP Latin Awards	2022	"Amor En Coma" (ft. Manuel Turizo)	Most Performed Songs	Won	
ASCAP Latin Awards	2022	"Sobrio"	Most Performed Songs	Won	
ASCAP Latin Awards	2024	"Coco Loco"	Most Performed Songs	Won	
ASCAP Latin Awards	2024	"La Fórmula" (with Marc Anthony)	Most Performed Songs	Won	
ASCAP Latin Awards	2024	"Según Quién" (with Carín León)	Most Performed Songs	Won	
ASCAP Latin Awards	2025	"Por Qué Será?" (with Grupo Frontera)	Most Performed Songs	Won	
Billboard Music Awards	2016	"Borró Cassette"	Top Latin Song	Nominated	
Billboard Music Awards	2017	Himself	Top Latin Artist	Nominated	
Billboard Music Awards	2017	"Chantaje" (with Shakira)	Top Latin Song	Nominated	
Billboard Music Awards	2018	"Felices Los 4"	Top Latin Song	Nominated	
Billboard Music Awards	2019	Himself	Top Latin Artist	Nominated	
Billboard Music Awards	2020	11:11	Top Latin Album	Nominated	
Billboard Music Awards	2021	Himself	Top Latin Artist	Nominated	
Billboard Music Awards	2021	"Hawái" (with The Weeknd)	Top Latin Song	Nominated	
Billboard Latin Music Awards	2016	Himself	Artist of the Year, New	Nominated	
Billboard Latin Music Awards	2016	"Borró Cassette"	Latin Rhythm Song of the Year	Nominated	
Billboard Latin Music Awards	2017	Himself	Social Artist of the Year	Nominated	
Billboard Latin Music Awards	2017	Himself	Hot Latin Songs Artist of the Year, Male	Nominated	
Billboard Latin Music Awards	2017	Himself	Latin Rhythm Songs Artist of the Year, Solo	Nominated	
Billboard Latin Music Awards	2017	Himself	Latin Rhythm Albums Artist of the Year, Solo	Nominated	
Billboard Latin Music Awards	2017	"Chantaje" (with Shakira)	Hot Latin Song of the Year, Vocal Event	Nominated	
Billboard Latin Music Awards	2017	"El Perdedor" (with Yandel)	Latin Rhythm Song of the Year	Nominated	
Billboard Latin Music Awards	2017	Pretty Boy, Dirty Boy	Latin Rhythm Album of the Year	Nominated	
Billboard Latin Music Awards	2018	Himself	Social Artist of the Year	Won	
Billboard Latin Music Awards	2018	"Chantaje" (with Shakira)	Hot Latin Song of the Year, Vocal Event	Nominated	
Billboard Latin Music Awards	2018	"Chantaje" (with Shakira)	Digital Song of the Year	Nominated	
Billboard Latin Music Awards	2018	"Chantaje" (with Shakira)	Streaming Song of the Year	Nominated	
Billboard Latin Music Awards	2018	"Chantaje" (with Shakira)	Latin Pop Song of the Year	Nominated	
Billboard Latin Music Awards	2018	"Felices Los 4"	Hot Latin Song of the Year	Nominated	
Billboard Latin Music Awards	2018	"Felices Los 4"	Airplay Song of the Year	Nominated	
Billboard Latin Music Awards	2018	"Felices Los 4"	Digital Song of the Year	Nominated	
Billboard Latin Music Awards	2018	"Felices Los 4"	Streaming Song of the Year	Nominated	
Billboard Latin Music Awards	2018	"Felices Los 4"	Latin Rhythm Song of the Year	Nominated	
Billboard Latin Music Awards	2019	Himself	Top Latin Albums Artist of the Year, Male	Nominated	
Billboard Latin Music Awards	2019	Himself	Latin Rhythm Artist of the Year, Solo	Nominated	
Billboard Latin Music Awards	2019	"Clandestino" (with Shakira)	Latin Pop Song of the Year	Nominated	
Billboard Latin Music Awards	2020	Himself	Latin Rhythm Artist of the Year, Solo	Nominated	
Billboard Latin Music Awards	2020	“Vivir Bailando” (with Silvestre Dangond)	Tropical Song of the Year	Nominated	
Billboard Latin Music Awards	2020	Himself	Spirit of Hope	Won	
Billboard Latin Music Awards	2021	Himself	Artist of the Year	Nominated	
Billboard Latin Music Awards	2021	Himself	Male Hot Latin Songs Artist of the Year	Nominated	
Billboard Latin Music Awards	2021	Himself	Latin Rhythm Artist of the Year	Nominated	
Billboard Latin Music Awards	2021	"Hawái" (with The Weeknd)	Hot Latin Song of the Year, Vocal Event	Nominated	
Billboard Latin Music Awards	2021	"Hawái" (with The Weeknd)	Hot Latin Song of the Year	Nominated	
Billboard Latin Music Awards	2021	"Hawái" (with The Weeknd)	Airplay Song of the Year	Won	
Billboard Latin Music Awards	2021	"Hawái" (with The Weeknd)	Sales Song of the Year	Nominated	
Billboard Latin Music Awards	2021	"Hawái" (with The Weeknd)	Streaming Song of the Year	Nominated	
Billboard Latin Music Awards	2021	"Hawái" (with The Weeknd)	Latin Rhythm Song of the Year	Won	
Billboard Latin Music Awards	2021	Papi Juancho	Top Latin Album of the Year	Nominated	
Billboard Latin Music Awards	2021	Papi Juancho	Latin Rhythm Album of the Year	Nominated	
Billboard Latin Music Awards	2022	Himself	Tour of the Year	Nominated	
Billboard Latin Music Awards	2022	"Cada Quien" (with Grupo Firme)	Regional Mexican Song of the Year	Nominated	
Billboard Latin Music Awards	2023	"Junio"	Latin Pop Song of the Year	Nominated	
Billboard Latin Music Awards	2025	"Cosas Pendientes"	Latin Pop Song of the Year	Nominated	
Billboard Touring Awards	2018	Himself	Breakthrough Artist	Nominated	
Grammy Awards	2020	11:11	Best Latin Pop Album	Nominated	
Grammy Awards	2023	The Love & Sex Tape	Best Música Urbana Album	Nominated	
Grammy Awards	2024	Don Juan	Best Latin Pop Album	Nominated	
Latin Grammy Awards	2013	Himself	Best New Artist	Nominated	
Latin Grammy Awards	2015	"El Tiki"	Best Urban Performance	Nominated	
Latin Grammy Awards	2017	"Vente Pa' Ca" (with Ricky Martin)	Record of the Year	Nominated	
Latin Grammy Awards	2017	"Chantaje" (with Shakira)	Record of the Year	Nominated	
Latin Grammy Awards	2017	"Felices los 4"	Record of the Year	Nominated	
Latin Grammy Awards	2017	"Felices los 4"	Song of the Year	Nominated	
Latin Grammy Awards	2017	"Vente Pa' Ca" (with Ricky Martin)	Song of the Year	Nominated	
Latin Grammy Awards	2017	"Chantaje" (with Shakira)	Song of the Year	Nominated	
Latin Grammy Awards	2017	"Chantaje" (with Shakira)	Best Urban Fusion/Performance	Nominated	
Latin Grammy Awards	2018	F.A.M.E.	Best Contemporary Pop Vocal Album	Won	
Latin Grammy Awards	2020	"ADMV"	Song of the Year	Nominated	
Latin Grammy Awards	2021	"Hawái"	Song of the Year	Nominated	
Latin Grammy Awards	2021	"Hawái (Remix)" (with The Weeknd)	Best Urban Fusion/Performance	Nominated	
Latin Grammy Awards	2022	"Cada Quien" (with Grupo Firme)	Best Regional Mexican Song	Nominated	
Latin Grammy Awards	2023	"La Fórmula" (with Marc Anthony)	Record of the Year	Nominated	
Latin Grammy Awards	2023	"La Fórmula" (with Marc Anthony)	Best Tropical Song	Nominated	
Latin Grammy Awards	2024	"Según Quién" (with Carín León)	Song of the Year	Nominated	
Latin Grammy Awards	2025	"Cosas Pendientes"	Best Urban Song	Nominated	
Latin Grammy Awards	2025	"Si Tú Me Vieras" (with Carín León)	Best Regional Mexican Song	Nominated	
Latin American Music Awards	2015	Himself	New Artist of the Year	Nominated	
Latin American Music Awards	2016	"El Perdedor" (with Yandel)	Favorite Collaboration	Nominated	
Latin American Music Awards	2016	"Borró Cassette"	Favorite Urban Song	Nominated	
Latin American Music Awards	2017	Himself	Artist of the Year	Nominated	
Latin American Music Awards	2017	Himself	Favorite Artist Urban	Nominated	
Latin American Music Awards	2017	"Chantaje" (with Shakira)	Song of the Year	Nominated	
Latin American Music Awards	2017	"Chantaje" (with Shakira)	Favorite Collaboration	Nominated	
Latin American Music Awards	2017	"Chantaje" (with Shakira)	Favorite Song Pop/Rock	Nominated	
Latin American Music Awards	2017	"Vente Pa' Ca" (with Ricky Martin)	Favorite Song Pop/Rock	Nominated	
Latin American Music Awards	2017	"Felices Los 4"	Favorite Song Urban	Won	
Latin American Music Awards	2018	Himself	Extraordinary Evolution Award	Won	
Latin American Music Awards	2018	Himself	Artist of the Year	Nominated	
Latin American Music Awards	2018	Himself	Favorite Male Artist	Nominated	
Latin American Music Awards	2018	Himself	Favorite Artist Urban	Nominated	
Latin American Music Awards	2018	"Corazón" (with Nego do Borel)	Song of the Year	Nominated	
Latin American Music Awards	2019	Himself	Artist of the Year	Nominated	
Latin American Music Awards	2019	"Amigos Con Derechos" (with Reik)	Favorite Pop Song	Nominated	
Latin American Music Awards	2019	“Vivir Bailando” (with Silvestre Dangond)	Favorite Song - Tropical	Nominated	
Latin American Music Awards	2019	“La Respuesta” (with Becky G)	Favorite Video	Nominated	
Latin American Music Awards	2021	Himself	Artist of the Year	Nominated	
Latin American Music Awards	2021	Himself	Favorite Male Artist	Nominated	
Latin American Music Awards	2021	"Hawái (Remix)" (with The Weeknd)	Song of the Year	Nominated	
Latin American Music Awards	2021	"Hawái (Remix)" (with The Weeknd)	Favorite Urban Song	Nominated	
Latin American Music Awards	2022	Himself	Favorite Urban Artist	Nominated	
Latin American Music Awards	2022	Papi Juancho	Favorite Urban Album	Nominated	
Latin American Music Awards	2022	"Sobrio"	Favorite Pop Song	Nominated	
Latin American Music Awards	2022	Papi Juancho Tour	Favorite Tour	Nominated	
Latin American Music Awards	2023	"Junio"	Favorite Pop Song	Nominated	
Latin American Music Awards	2023	Papi Juancho World Tour	Tour of the Year	Nominated	
Latin American Music Awards	2024	Himself	Global Latin Artist of the Year	Nominated	
Latin American Music Awards	2024	"Según Quién" (with Carín León)	Song of the Year	Nominated	
Latin American Music Awards	2024	"Según Quién" (with Carín León)	Collaboration of the Year	Nominated	
Latin American Music Awards	2024	"Ojalá" (with The Rudeboyz & Adam Levine)	Collaboration Crossover of the Year	Nominated	
Latin American Music Awards	2024	"La Fórmula" (with Marc Anthony)	Best Tropical Collaboration	Nominated	
LOS40 Music Awards	2014	Himself	Best Colombian Act	Won	
LOS40 Music Awards	2016	Himself	Best Latin Artist	Nominated	
LOS40 Music Awards	2016	"Borró Cassette"	Global Show Awards	Won	
LOS40 Music Awards	2017	Himself	Best Latin Artist	Won	
LOS40 Music Awards	2017	"Felices Los 4"	LOS40 Global Show Award	Nominated	
LOS40 Music Awards	2017	Pretty Boy Dirty Boy World Tour	Tour of the Year	Nominated	
LOS40 Music Awards	2018	Himself	Best Latin Artist	Nominated	
LOS40 Music Awards	2018	"Corazón" (with Nego do Borel)	LOS40 Global Show Award	Nominated	
LOS40 Music Awards	2020	Himself	Best Latin Act	Won	
LOS40 Music Awards	2020	Himself	Best Urban Act	Nominated	
LOS40 Music Awards	2020	"Hawái"	Best Latin Song	Won	
LOS40 Music Awards	2020	"Hawái"	Best Latin Video	Nominated	
LOS40 Music Awards	2022	Himself	Best Latin Act	Nominated	
LOS40 Music Awards	2022	Papi Juancho Tour	Best Latin Tour, Festival or Concert	Nominated	
LOS40 Music Awards	2023	Himself	Best Latin Act	Nominated	
LOS40 Music Awards	2023	"Coco Loco"	Best Latin Song	Nominated	
LOS40 Music Awards	2024	Himself	Best Latin Act	Nominated	
LOS40 Music Awards	2024	Himself	Best Latin Live Act	Nominated	
LOS40 Music Awards	2024	Himself	Golden Music Award	Won	
LOS40 Music Awards	2024	Don Juan World Tour	Best Latin Tour, Festival or Concert	Won	
LOS40 Music Awards	2024	"Ohnana (Remix)" (with Kapo, Ryan Castro, Farruko & Nicky Jam)	Best Latin Collaboration	Nominated	
LOS40 Music Awards	2025	Dirty + Pretty World Tour	Best Latin Tour, Festival or Concert	Pending	
MTV Europe Music Awards	2013	Himself	Best Latin America Central Act	Nominated	
MTV Europe Music Awards	2016	Himself	Best Latin America Central Act	Won	
MTV Europe Music Awards	2017	Himself	Best Colombian Act	Won	
MTV Europe Music Awards	2018	Himself	Best Latin America Central Act	Nominated	
MTV Europe Music Awards	2019	Himself	Best Latin America Central Act	Nominated	
MTV Europe Music Awards	2020	Himself	Best Latin	Nominated	
MTV Europe Music Awards	2020	Himself	Best Virtual Live	Nominated	
MTV Europe Music Awards	2020	Himself	Best Latin America Central Act	Nominated	
MTV Europe Music Awards	2021	Himself	Best Latin America Central Act	Nominated	
MTV Europe Music Awards	2021	Himself	Best Latin	Won	
MTV Millennial Awards	2014	Himself	Artist of the Year (Colombia)	Won	
MTV Millennial Awards	2014	Himself	Latin Star on Instagram	Nominated	
MTV Millennial Awards	2014	Himself	Millennial + Hot	Nominated	
MTV Millennial Awards	2016	Himself	Snapchatter of the Year (Colombia)	Nominated	
MTV Millennial Awards	2016	Himself	Perfect Match	Nominated	
MTV Millennial Awards	2016	Himself	Artist of the Year (Colombia)	Won	
MTV Millennial Awards	2016	"Borró Cassette"	Hit of the Year	Nominated	
MTV Millennial Awards	2017	Himself	Artist of the Year (Colombia)	Won	
MTV Millennial Awards	2017	Himself	Instagrammer of the Year (Colombia)	Nominated	
MTV Millennial Awards	2017	"Me Llamas" (Remix) (with Piso 21)	Best Party Anthem	Nominated	
MTV Millennial Awards	2017	"Vente Pa' Ca" (with Ricky Martin)	Best Party Anthem	Nominated	
MTV Millennial Awards	2017	"Chantaje" (with Shakira)	Collaboration of the Year	Nominated	
MTV Millennial Awards	2017	"El Perdedor"	Hit of the Year	Nominated	
MTV Millennial Awards	2018	Himself	Artist of the Year (Colombia)	Nominated	
MTV Millennial Awards	2018	Himself	Instagrammer of the Year (Colombia)	Nominated	
MTV Millennial Awards	2018	Himself	Fan of the Year	Nominated	
MTV Millennial Awards	2018	"Corazón" (with Nego do Borel)	Hit of the Year	Nominated	
MTV Millennial Awards	2018	"El Préstamo"	Video of the Year	Nominated	
MTV Millennial Awards	2019	Himself	Artist of the Year (Colombia)	Nominated	
MTV Millennial Awards	2019	Himself	Fan of the Year	Nominated	
MTV Millennial Awards	2019	"Mala Mia"	Hit of the Year	Nominated	
MTV Millennial Awards	2019	"Friends with Rights" (with Reik)	Hit of the Year	Nominated	
MTV Millennial Awards	2021	Himself	Artist of the Year (Colombia)	Nominated	
MTV Millennial Awards	2021	Himself	MIAW Artist	Nominated	
MTV Millennial Awards	2021	"Hawái"	Hit of the Year	Nominated	
MTV Millennial Awards	2022	Himself	MIAW Artist	Nominated	
MTV Millennial Awards	2022	"Cada Quien" (with Grupo Firme)	Music Ship of the Year	Nominated	
MTV Video Music Awards	2018	"Chantaje" (with Shakira)	Best Latin	Nominated	
MTV Video Music Awards	2018	"Felices los 4"	Best Latin	Nominated	
MTV Video Music Awards	2019	"Mala Mia"	Best Latin	Nominated	
MTV Video Music Awards	2020	"Qué Pena" (ft J Balvin)	Best Latin	Won	
MTV Video Music Awards	2021	"Hawái"	Best Latin	Nominated	
MTV Video Music Awards	2023	"La Reina"	Video for Good	Nominated	
Multishow Brazilian Music Award	2017	"Sim ou Não" (with Anitta)	Best Song	Won	
Meus Prêmios Nick	2017	"Sim ou Não" (with Anitta)	Favorite Collaboration	Nominated	
Nickelodeon Kids' Choice Awards	2015	Himself	Favorite Artis Hispanic America	Nominated	
Nickelodeon Colombia Kids' Choice Awards	2014	Himself	Favorite National Artist or Group	Won	
Nickelodeon Colombia Kids' Choice Awards	2016	Himself	Favorite National Artist or Group	Won	
Nickelodeon Colombia Kids' Choice Awards	2016	Himself	Best Male Look	Nominated	
Nickelodeon Colombia Kids' Choice Awards	2016	"Borro Cassette"	Favorite Latin Song	Won	
Nickelodeon Colombia Kids' Choice Awards	2017	Himself	Favorite National Artist or Group	Won	
Nickelodeon Argentina Kids' Choice Awards	2018	Himself	Favorite International Artist or Group	Nominated	
Nickelodeon Argentina Kids' Choice Awards	2018	"Corazón" (with Nego do Borel)	Favorite Latin American Song	Nominated	
E! Latino	2014	Himself	Celebrity E!	Won	
Heat Latin Music Awards	2015	Himself	Best Artist Andino	Nominated	
Heat Latin Music Awards	2016	Himself	Best Male Artist	Nominated	
Heat Latin Music Awards	2016	Himself	Best Artist Andino	Won	
Heat Latin Music Awards	2016	"Borró Casette"	Best Video	Nominated	
Heat Latin Music Awards	2017	Himself	Best Male Artist	Nominated	
Heat Latin Music Awards	2017	Himself	Best Urban Artist	Nominated	
Heat Latin Music Awards	2017	Himself	Best Artist Andino	Nominated	
Heat Latin Music Awards	2019	Himself	Best Male Artist	Nominated	
Heat Latin Music Awards	2019	Himself	Best Urban Artist	Nominated	
Heat Latin Music Awards	2019	"Felices Los 4" (with Marc Anthony)	Best Collaboration	Nominated	
Heat Latin Music Awards	2020	Himself	Best Male Artist	Nominated	
Heat Latin Music Awards	2021	Himself	Best Male Artist	Nominated	
Heat Latin Music Awards	2021	"Mi Niña (Remix)" (with Wisin, Myke Towers & Anitta)	Best Video	Won	
Heat Latin Music Awards	2022	Himself	Best Male Artist	Nominated	
Heat Latin Music Awards	2023	Himself	Best Male Artist	Nominated	
Heat Latin Music Awards	2023	"La Reina"	Best Video	Nominated	
Heat Latin Music Awards	2023	"La Fórmula" (with Marc Anthony)	Song of the Year	Nominated	
Heat Latin Music Awards	2024	Himself	Best Pop Artist	Nominated	
Heat Latin Music Awards	2024	"Trofeo" (with Yandel)	Best Collaboration	Nominated	
Heat Latin Music Awards	2024	"Según Quién" (with Carín León)	Best Collaboration	Nominated	
Heat Latin Music Awards	2024	"Según Quién" (with Carín León)	Best Viral Song	Nominated	
Heat Latin Music Awards	2025	Himself	Best Male Artist	Nominated	
iHeartRadio Music Awards	2019	Himself	Latin Artist of the Year	Nominated	
iHeartRadio Music Awards	2019	"Clandestino" (with Shakira)	Latin Song of the Year	Nominated	
iHeartRadio Music Awards	2020	Himself	Latin Pop/Urban Artist of the Year	Nominated	
iHeartRadio Music Awards	2021	Himself	Latin Pop/Reggaeton Artist of the Year	Nominated	
iHeartRadio Music Awards	2021	"Hawái (Remix)" (with The Weeknd)	Latin Pop/Reggaeton Song of the Year	Nominated	
iHeartRadio Music Awards	2021	"Hawái"	Best Music Video	Nominated	
iHeartRadio Music Awards	2023	"Cada Quien" (with Grupo Firme)	Regional Mexican Song of the Year	Nominated	
Lunas del Auditorio	2017	Himself	Best Urban	Won	
People's Choice Awards	2019	Himself	The Latin Artist of 2019	Nominated	
People's Choice Awards	2020	Himself	The Latin Artist of 2020	Nominated	
People's Choice Awards	2021	Himself	The Latin Artist of 2021	Nominated	
People's Choice Awards	2024	Himself	The Male Latin Artist of the Year	Nominated	
Premios Juventud	2016	Himself	Voz del Momento	Nominated	
Premios Juventud	2016	Himself	Mi Artista Urbano	Nominated	
Premios Juventud	2016	Himself	Mi Tuitero Favorito	Nominated	
Premios Juventud	2016	"Desde Esa Noche" (with Thalía)	La Combinación Perfecta	Nominated	
Premios Juventud	2016	Pretty Boy, Dirty Boy	Lo Toco Todo	Nominated	
Premios Juventud	2016	"Borro Cassette"	La Más Pegajosa	Nominated	
Premios Juventud	2016	Pretty Boy, Dirty Boy World Tour	El Súper Tour	Nominated	
Premios Juventud	2016	Malumaniaticas	Mi "Fan Army" Favorito	Nominated	
Premios Juventud	2017	Himself	Mejor Fashionista	Won	
Premios Juventud	2017	Himself	Mejor Instagram	Won	
Premios Juventud	2017	"Chantaje" (with Shakira)	Major Canción para "Chillin"	Won	
Premios Juventud	2017	"Chantaje" (with Shakira)	Combination Preferita	Nominated	
Premios Juventud	2017	"Chantaje" (with Shakira)	Major Canción para Bailar	Won	
Premios Juventud	2017	"Vente Pa' Ca" (with Ricky Martin)	Major Canción para Cantar	Won	
Premios Juventud	2017	"Me Llamas" (with Piso 21)	Major Canción para Cantar	Won	
Premios Juventud	2019	Himself	Singer + Songwriter + Composer (Best Singer-Songwriter)	Nominated	
Premios Juventud	2019	Himself	High Fashion	Won	
Premios Juventud	2019	Himself	Shoe-Aholic	Won	
Premios Juventud	2019	Himself	Hair Obsessed	Won	
Premios Juventud	2019	"Créeme" (with Karol G)	Best Song: Can't Get Enough of This Song	Won	
Premios Juventud	2019	"Créeme" (with Karol G)	This Is a BTS (Best Behind the Scenes)	Nominated	
Premios Juventud	2019	"La Respuesta" (with Becky G)	Sick Dance Routine (Best Choreography)	Won	
Premios Juventud	2019	"HP"	Sick Dance Routine (Best Choreography)	Won	
Premios Juventud	2020	Himself	Breaking the Internet	Nominated	
Premios Juventud	2020	Himself	High Fashion	Nominated	
Premios Juventud	2020	"Qué Pena" (with J Balvin)	The Perfect Mix	Nominated	
Premios Juventud	2021	Himself	Male Youth Artist of the Year	Nominated	
Premios Juventud	2021	"Mi Niña (Remix)" (with Wisin, Myke Towers, Anitta & Los Legendarios)	Best Collaboration	Nominated	
Premios Juventud	2021	"Porfa (Remix)" (with Feid, Justin Quiles, J Balvin, Nicky Jam & Sech)	Best Collaboration	Nominated	
Premios Juventud	2021	"Hawái"	Viral Track of the Year	Nominated	
Premios Juventud	2021	"Hawái (Remix)" (with The Weeknd)	Collaboration with an Anglo artist	Won	
Premios Juventud	2021	"100 Años" (with Carlos Rivera & Calibre 50)	Best Regional Mexican Fusion	Nominated	
Premios Juventud	2021	Papi Juancho	Album of the Year	Nominated	
Premios Juventud	2022	Himself	Male Youth Artist of the Year	Nominated	
Premios Juventud	2022	Himself	Trendiest Artist	Nominated	
Premios Juventud	2022	"Mojando Asientos" (with Feid)	The Perfect Mix	Nominated	
Premios Juventud	2022	"Mamá Tetema" (with Rayvanny)	Collaboration OMG	Nominated	
Premios Juventud	2022	"Sobrio"	Viral Track of the Year	Nominated	
Premios Juventud	2022	"Cada Quien" (with Grupo Firme)	Best Regional Mexican Fusion	Won	
Premios Juventud	2023	Himself	My Favorite Trendsetter	Nominated	
Premios Juventud	2023	"Ojalá" (with Adam Levine & The RudeBoyz)	OMG Collaboration	Nominated	
Premios Juventud	2023	"La Reina"	Video with the Most Powerful Message	Won	
Premios Juventud	2023	"Nos Comemos Vivos" (with Chencho Corleone)	Best Urban Mix	Nominated	
Premios Juventud	2023	"Nunca y Pico" (with Yandel & Eladio Carrion)	Best Urban Mix	Nominated	
Premios Juventud	2023	"Junio"	Best Pop Track	Nominated	
Premios Juventud	2023	The Love & Sex Tape (Deluxe Edition)	Best Pop/Urban Album	Nominated	
Premios Juventud	2023	"La Fórmula" (with Marc Anthony)	Best Tropical Hit	Nominated	
Premios Juventud	2023	"La Fórmula" (with Marc Anthony)	Best Tropical Mix	Nominated	
Premios Juventud	2024	Himself	Male Artist of the Youth	Nominated	
Premios Juventud	2024	Don Juan	Best Pop/Urban Album	Nominated	
Premios Juventud	2024	"Según Quién" (with Carin León)	The Perfect Mix	Nominated	
Premios Juventud	2024	"Según Quién" (with Carin León)	Best Regional Mexican Fusion	Won	
Premios Juventud	2024	"Celular" (with Nicky Jam & The Chainsmokers)	OMG Collaboration	Nominated	
Premios Juventud	2024	"Celular" (with Nicky Jam & The Chainsmokers)	Favorite Dance Track	Nominated	
Premios Juventud	2024	"Coco Loco"	Best Pop/Urban Song	Nominated	
Premios Juventud	2025	"Por Qué Será?" (with Grupo Frontera)	The Perfect Collab	Nominated	
Premios Juventud	2025	"Cosas Pendientes"	Best Pop/Urban Song	Nominated	
Premios Juventud	2025	"Ohnana (Remix)" (with Kapo, Ryan Castro, Farruko & Nicky Jam)	Tropical Mix	Nominated	
Premios Juventud	2025	"+57" (with Karol G, Feid, DFZM, Ovy On The Drums, J Balvin, Ryan Castro, Blessd)	Best Urban Track	Nominated	
Premios Juventud	2026	Himself	Premios Juventud Male Artist	Pending	
Premios Juventud	2026	"Un Polvito +" (with Maisak)	Best Urban Mix	Pending	
Premios Juventud	2026	"Bronceador"	Best Pop/Urban Song	Pending	
Premios Juventud	2026	"1+1" (with Kany García)	Tropical Hit	Pending	
Premios Juventud	2026	"Apambichao" (with Manuel Turizo)	Tropical Mix	Pending	
Premios Lo Nuestro	2015	"La Temperatura" (with Eli Palacios)	Urban Collaboration of the Year	Nominated	
Premios Lo Nuestro	2017	Pretty Boy, Dirty Boy	Album of the Year - Urban	Won	
Premios Lo Nuestro	2017	"El Perdedor"	Song of the Year - Urban	Nominated	
Premios Lo Nuestro	2017	Himself	Artist of the Year - Urban	Won	
Premios Lo Nuestro	2019	"Clandestino" (with Shakira)	Collaboration of the Year - Pop/Rock	Nominated	
Premios Lo Nuestro	2019	"El Prestamo"	Video of the Year	Nominated	
Premios Lo Nuestro	2019	F.A.M.E. World Tour	Tour of the Year	Nominated	
Premios Lo Nuestro	2019	Himself	Artist of the Year	Nominated	
Premios Lo Nuestro	2019	Himself	Artist of the Year - Pop/Rock	Won	
Premios Lo Nuestro	2019	Himself	Social Artist of the Year	Nominated	
Premios Lo Nuestro	2020	"Amigos Con Derechos" (with Reik)	Pop/Rock Collaboration of the Year	Nominated	
Premios Lo Nuestro	2020	"Amigos Con Derechos" (with Reik)	Urban/Pop Song of the Year	Nominated	
Premios Lo Nuestro	2020	"Créeme" (with Karol G)	Pop/Rock Collaboration of the Year	Nominated	
Premios Lo Nuestro	2020	"Créeme" (with Karol G)	Urban/Pop Song of the Year	Nominated	
Premios Lo Nuestro	2020	"Vivir Bailando" (with Silvestre Dangond)	Tropical Song of the Year	Nominated	
Premios Lo Nuestro	2020	"Vivir Bailando" (with Silvestre Dangond)	Tropical Collaboration of the Year	Nominated	
Premios Lo Nuestro	2020	11:11	Album of the Year	Nominated	
Premios Lo Nuestro	2020	11:11 World Tour	Tour of the Year	Nominated	
Premios Lo Nuestro	2021	Himself	Artist of the Year	Nominated	
Premios Lo Nuestro	2021	Himself	Male Urban Artist of the Year	Nominated	
Premios Lo Nuestro	2021	"ADMV"	Song of the Year	Nominated	
Premios Lo Nuestro	2021	"ADMV"	Pop Song of the Year	Won	
Premios Lo Nuestro	2021	"ADMV"	Pop/Ballad Song of the Year	Won	
Premios Lo Nuestro	2021	"Hawái"	Urban Song of the Year	Nominated	
Premios Lo Nuestro	2021	"Qué Pena" (with J Balvin)	Urban Collaboration of the Year	Nominated	
Premios Lo Nuestro	2021	"Hawái (Remix)" (with The Weeknd)	Crossover Collaboration of the Year	Nominated	
Premios Lo Nuestro	2021	"Hawái (Remix)" (with The Weeknd)	Remix of the Year	Nominated	
Premios Lo Nuestro	2021	"Porfa (Remix)" (with Feid, Justin Quiles, J Balvin, Nicky Jam & Sech)	Remix of the Year	Nominated	
Premios Lo Nuestro	2021	Papi Juancho	Album of the Year	Nominated	
Premios Lo Nuestro	2021	Papi Juancho	Urban Album of the Year	Nominated	
Premios Lo Nuestro	2022	Himself	Artist of the Year	Nominated	
Premios Lo Nuestro	2022	Himself	Pop Artist of the Year	Nominated	
Premios Lo Nuestro	2022	"100 Años" (with Carlos Rivera)	Perfect Mix of The Year	Nominated	
Premios Lo Nuestro	2022	"Perfecta" (with Reik)	Pop Collaboration of the Year	Nominated	
Premios Lo Nuestro	2022	"Amor en Coma" (with Manuel Turizo)	Urban Collaboration of the Year	Nominated	
Premios Lo Nuestro	2022	"Sobrio"	Urban/Pop Song of the Year	Nominated	
Premios Lo Nuestro	2023	Himself	Male Pop Artist of the Year	Nominated	
Premios Lo Nuestro	2023	"Cada Quien" (with Grupo Firme)	Song of the Year	Nominated	
Premios Lo Nuestro	2023	"Cada Quien" (with Grupo Firme)	The Perfect Mix of the Year	Won	
Premios Lo Nuestro	2023	"Cada Quien" (with Grupo Firme)	Banda Song of the Year	Won	
Premios Lo Nuestro	2023	Papi Juancho World Tour	Tour of the Year	Nominated	
Premios Lo Nuestro	2023	"Sobrio"	Pop Song of the Year	Nominated	
Premios Lo Nuestro	2023	The Love & Sex Tape	Urban Album of the Year	Nominated	
Premios Lo Nuestro	2023	"Mama Tetema" (with Rayvanny)	Urban/Pop Song of the Year	Nominated	
Premios Lo Nuestro	2024	Himself	Artist of the Year	Nominated	
Premios Lo Nuestro	2024	Himself	Male Pop Artist of the Year	Won	
Premios Lo Nuestro	2024	"Nunca y Pico" (with Yandel & Eladio Carrion)	Song of the Year	Nominated	
Premios Lo Nuestro	2024	"Nunca y Pico" (with Yandel & Eladio Carrion)	Urban Collaboration of the Year	Nominated	
Premios Lo Nuestro	2024	Don Juan	Album of the Year	Nominated	
Premios Lo Nuestro	2024	Don Juan	Pop/Urban Album of the Year	Nominated	
Premios Lo Nuestro	2024	"Ojalá" (with Adam Levine & The RudeBoyz)	Crossover Collaboration of the Year	Nominated	
Premios Lo Nuestro	2024	"Según Quién" (with Carín León)	The Perfect Mix of the Year	Won	
Premios Lo Nuestro	2024	"Según Quién" (with Carín León)	Mexican Regional Collaboration of the Year	Won	
Premios Lo Nuestro	2024	"Coco Loco"	Pop Song of the Year	Nominated	
Premios Lo Nuestro	2024	"Junio"	Pop/Urban Song of the Year	Nominated	
Premios Lo Nuestro	2024	"Celular" (with Nicky Jam & The Chainsmokers)	Urban Pop/Dance Song of the Year	Nominated	
Premios Lo Nuestro	2024	"Tá OK (Remix)" (with Karol G, Dennis & MC Kevin O Chris)	Urban Pop/Dance Song of the Year	Won	
Premios Lo Nuestro	2024	"La Fórmula" (with Marc Anthony)	Tropical Collaboration of the Year	Nominated	
Premios Lo Nuestro	2025	Himself	Artist of the Year	Nominated	
Premios Lo Nuestro	2025	Himself	Male Pop Artist of the Year	Nominated	
Premios Lo Nuestro	2025	"Bling Bling" (with Octavio Cuadras & Grupo Marca Registrada)	The Perfect Mix of the Year	Nominated	
Premios Lo Nuestro	2025	"Bling Bling" (with Octavio Cuadras & Grupo Marca Registrada)	Mexican Music Collaboration of the Year	Nominated	
Premios Lo Nuestro	2025	"OA" (with Anuel AA, Quevedo, Mambo Kingz & DJ Luian)	Pop-Urban Collaboration of the Year	Nominated	
Premios Lo Nuestro	2026	Himself	Artist of the Year	Nominated	
Premios Lo Nuestro	2026	Himself	Male Pop Artist of the Year	Nominated	
Premios Lo Nuestro	2026	"+57" (with Karol G, Feid, DFZM, Ovy On The Drums, J Balvin, Ryan Castro, Blessd)	Urban Collaboration of the Year	Won	
Premios Lo Nuestro	2026	"Bronceador"	Pop Song of the Year	Nominated	
Premios Lo Nuestro	2026	"Cosas Pendientes"	Pop/Urban Song of the Year	Nominated	
Premios Lo Nuestro	2026	“Si Tú Me Vieras” (with Carín León)	Mexican Music Collaboration of the Year	Won	
Premios Nuestra Tierra	2012	Himself	Best New Artist of the Year	Nominated	
Premios Nuestra Tierra	2013	Himself	Best Artist of the Year	Nominated	
Premios Nuestra Tierra	2013	Himself	Best Urban Artist Solo or Group of the Year	Nominated	
Premios Nuestra Tierra	2013	Himself	Best Artist of the Public	Nominated	
Premios Nuestra Tierra	2013	MalumaFamily	Best Fan Club	Nominated	
Premios Nuestra Tierra	2013	@malumacolombia	Twitterer of the Year	Nominated	
Premios Nuestra Tierra	2014	"La Temperatura" (with Eli Palacios)	Best Urban Interpretation of the Year	Won	
Premios Nuestra Tierra	2014	"La Temperatura" (with Eli Palacios)	Best Song of Public	Nominated	
Premios Nuestra Tierra	2014	Himself	Best Urban Artist Solo or Group of the Year	Nominated	
Premios Nuestra Tierra	2014	Himself	Best Artist of the Public	Nominated	
Premios Nuestra Tierra	2014	MalumaFamily	Best Fan Club	Nominated	
Premios Nuestra Tierra	2014	@malumacolombia	Twitterer of the Year	Nominated	
Premios Nuestra Tierra	2020	Himself	Artist of the Year	Nominated	
Premios Nuestra Tierra	2020	Himself	Best Arstist - Public Vote	Nominated	
Premios Nuestra Tierra	2020	"HP"	Best Video	Nominated	
Premios Nuestra Tierra	2020	"11 PM"	Best Urban Song	Nominated	
Premios Nuestra Tierra	2020	"11 PM"	Best Song - Public Vote	Nominated	
Premios Nuestra Tierra	2020	"11:11"	Album of the Year	Nominated	
Premios Nuestra Tierra	2020	11:11 World Tour	Best Tour	Nominated	
Premios Nuestra Tierra	2021	Himself	Artist of the Year	Nominated	
Premios Nuestra Tierra	2021	Himself	Best Image in The World	Nominated	
Premios Nuestra Tierra	2021	Himself	Best Arstist - Public Vote	Nominated	
Premios Nuestra Tierra	2021	"Hawái"	Song of the Year	Won	
Premios Nuestra Tierra	2021	"Hawái"	Best Video	Nominated	
Premios Nuestra Tierra	2021	"Hawái"	Best Song - Public Vote	Nominated	
Premios Nuestra Tierra	2021	Papi Juancho	Album of the Year	Nominated	
Premios Nuestra Tierra	2021	"Parce" (with Justin Quiles & Lenny Tavárez)	Best Urban Song	Nominated	
Premios Nuestra Tierra	2021	"ADMV"	Best Pop Song	Nominated	
Premios Nuestra Tierra	2021	"Qué Chimba"	Best Dance/Electro Song	Nominated	
Premios Nuestra Tierra	2021	11:11 (Europe)	Best Tour	Nominated	
Premios Nuestra Tierra	2022	"Sobrio"	Song of the Year	Nominated	
Premios Nuestra Tierra	2022	"Sobrio"	Best Pop Song	Nominated	
Premios Nuestra Tierra	2022	"Sobrio"	Best Song - Public Vote	Nominated	
Premios Nuestra Tierra	2022	"Aloha" (with Rauw Alejandro, Darell & Béele)	Best Urban Song	Nominated	
Premios Nuestra Tierra	2022	Papi Juancho Tour	Best Tour	Nominated	
Premios Nuestra Tierra	2023	Himself	Artist of the Year	Nominated	
Premios Nuestra Tierra	2023	Himself	Best Urban Artist	Nominated	
Premios Nuestra Tierra	2023	"Ojalá" (with Adam Levine & The RudeBoyz)	Best Urban Collaboration	Nominated	
Premios Nuestra Tierra	2023	"Mojando Asientos" (with Feid)	Best Urban Collaboration	Nominated	
Premios Nuestra Tierra	2023	"Mojando Asientos" (with Feid)	Best Urban Song	Nominated	
Premios Nuestra Tierra	2023	"Junio"	Best Pop Song	Nominated	
Premios Nuestra Tierra	2023	"Tsunami" (with Arcangel & De La Ghetto)	Best Video of the Year	Nominated	
Premios Nuestra Tierra	2023	Medallo En El Mapa	Best Concert of the Year	Won	
Premios Nuestra Tierra	2024	Himself	Artist of the Year	Nominated	
Premios Nuestra Tierra	2024	"Según Quién" (with Carín León)	Song of the Year	Nominated	
Premios Nuestra Tierra	2024	"Según Quién" (with Carín León)	Best Popular Song	Nominated	
Premios Nuestra Tierra	2024	Don Juan	Album of the Year	Nominated	
Premios Nuestra Tierra	2024	"Trofeo" (with Yandel)	Best Urban Song	Nominated	
Premios Nuestra Tierra	2024	"Trofeo" (with Yandel)	Best Music Video	Nominated	
Premios Nuestra Tierra	2025	Himself	Best Global Artist	Nominated	
Premios Nuestra Tierra	2025	"Cosas Pendientes"	Best Global Song	Nominated	
Premios Nuestra Tierra	2025	"Cosas Pendientes"	Best Urban Song	Nominated	
Premios Nuestra Tierra	2025	"Cosas Pendientes"	Best Video of the Year	Nominated	
Premios Nuestra Tierra	2025	"Gafas Negras" (with J Balvin)	Best Urban Collaboration	Nominated	
Premios Nuestra Tierra	2025	"Oe, Bebé" (with Blessd)	Best Urban Collaboration	Nominated	
Premios Nuestra Tierra	2025	"+57" (with Karol G, Feid, DFZM, Ovy On The Drums, J Balvin, Ryan Castro, Blessd)	Best Urban Collaboration	Nominated	
Premios Nuestra Tierra	2026	Himself	Best Global Artist	Nominated	
Premios Nuestra Tierra	2026	Himself	Best Urban Artist	Nominated	
Premios Nuestra Tierra	2026	"Bronceador"	Best Song/Composition of the Year	Nominated	
Premios Nuestra Tierra	2026	"Un Polvito +" (with Maisak)	Best Urban Song	Nominated	
Premios Nuestra Tierra	2026	"Flaka" (with The Prodigiez, Kapo, Maisak, Hamilton, Zaider)	Best Afrobeat Song	Nominated	
Premios Nuestra Tierra	2026	"Flaka" (with The Prodigiez, Kapo, Maisak, Hamilton, Zaider)	Best Video of the Year	Nominated	
Premios Nuestra Tierra	2026	Medellín en el Mapa	Best Concert	Nominated	
Premios Odeón	2020	Himself	Latin Artist of the Year	Nominated	
Premios SHOCK	2011	"Farandulera"	Best New Artist or Group	Nominated	
Premios SHOCK	2012	"Pasarla Bien"	Best Urban Artist or Group	Nominated	
Premios SHOCK	2013	"Miss Independent"	Best Urban Artist or Group	Nominated	
Premios SHOCK	2013	"Miss Independent"	Best Radio Song	Won	
Premios SHOCK	2014	Himself	Best Artist or Group	Won	
Premios SHOCK	2014	Himself	Folk Artist	Won	
Premios SHOCK	2014	"Addicted"	Best Urban Artist or Group	Nominated	
Premios SHOCK	2014	"Addicted"	Best Radio Song	Won	
Premios SHOCK	2016	Himself	Best Artist or Group	Nominated	
Premios SHOCK	2016	Himself	Best Urban Artist or Group	Nominated	
Premios SHOCK	2016	Himself	People Artist	Won	
Premios SHOCK	2016	Pretty Boy, Dirty Boy	Best Album	Nominated	
Premios SHOCK	2016	"Borró Cassette"	Best Radio Song	Nominated	
Premios Tu Mundo	2014	"La Temperatura" (with Eli Palacios)	Start-Party Song	Nominated	
Premios Tu Mundo	2016	Himself	Favorite Urban Artist	Nominated	
Premios Tu Mundo	2017	Himself	Favorite Urban Artist	Won	
Premios Tu Mundo	2017	Himself	Fan Club of the Year	Nominated	
Premios TVyNovelas	2015	The Voice Kids	Best or Reality Competition Jury	Won	
Teen Choice Awards	2017	Himself	Choice Latin Artist	Nominated	
Teen Choice Awards	2017	"Chantaje" (with Shakira)	Choice Latin Song	Won	
Teen Choice Awards	2018	Himself	Choice Latin Artist	Nominated	
Teen Choice Awards	2019	Himself	Choice Latin Artist	Nominated	
Telehit Awards	2019	Himself	Male Artist of the Year	Nominated	
Telehit Awards	2019	Himself	Latin Artist of the Year	Nominated	
Telehit Awards	2019	"HP"	Best Urban Video	Nominated	
Tu Musica Urbano Awards	2019	Himself	International Male Artist	Nominated	
Tu Musica Urbano Awards	2019	"El Préstamo"	International Artist Song	Nominated	
Tu Musica Urbano Awards	2019	"Mala Mía"	International Artist Song	Nominated	
Tu Musica Urbano Awards	2019	"El Préstamo"	International Artist Video	Nominated	
Tu Musica Urbano Awards	2019	"Créeme" (with Karol G)	International Artist Video	Nominated	
Tu Musica Urbano Awards	2020	"11 PM"	Male Song of the Year	Nominated	
Tu Musica Urbano Awards	2020	11:11	Male Album of the Year	Nominated	
Tu Musica Urbano Awards	2020	"HP"	Video of the Year	Nominated	
Tu Musica Urbano Awards	2020	11:11 World Tour	World Tour	Nominated	
Tu Musica Urbano Awards	2022	Himself	Artist of the Year	Nominated	
Tu Musica Urbano Awards	2022	Himself	Top Artist - Pop Urban	Nominated	
Tu Musica Urbano Awards	2022	"Cada Quien" (with Grupo Firme)	Top Song - Regional Mexican	Nominated	
Tu Musica Urbano Awards	2022	"Perfecta" (with Reik)	Top Song - Pop Urban	Nominated	
Tu Musica Urbano Awards	2022	"Sobrio"	Top Song - Pop Urban	Nominated	
Tu Musica Urbano Awards	2023	Himself	Top Artist - Male	Nominated	
Tu Musica Urbano Awards	2023	"La Fórmula" (with Marc Anthony)	Top Song - Tropical Urban	Nominated	
Tu Musica Urbano Awards	2023	"La Reina"	Video of the Year	Nominated	
Tu Musica Urbano Awards	2025	"Por Que Será?" (with Grupo Frontera)	Top Song - Regional	Won	
Tu Musica Urbano Awards	2026	Himself	Top Artist Male - Pop	Nominated	

== Other accolades ==
=== Streaming milestones ===
Name of the platform, year presented, work(s), achievement
Platform	Year	Work(s)	Achievement	Ref.
Spotify	2022	"Hawái"	One Billion Streams Club	
Spotify	2024	"Chantaje" (Shakira featuring Maluma)	One Billion Streams Club	
Spotify	2025	"Borró Cassette"	One Billion Streams Club	
Spotify	2025	"Felices los 4"	One Billion Streams Club	

=== Other awards ===
- YouTube Play Button, 2017 (10,000,000 subscribers)
