= Maluma discography =

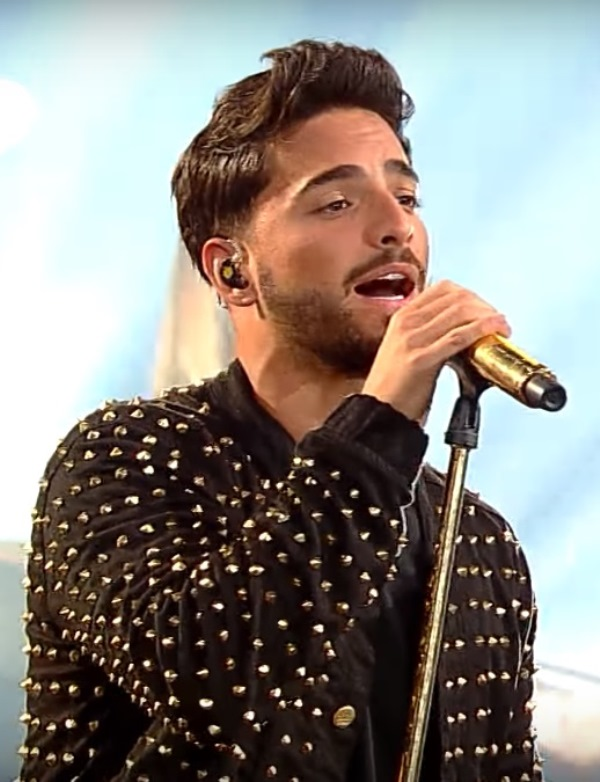
- Maluma performing "Sin Contrato", during the Festival de Viña del Mar 2017 in Chile.
- Studio albums: 6
- EPs: 3
- Singles: 115
- Mixtapes: 1
- Promotional singles: 10

Colombian singer and rapper Maluma has released six studio albums, one mixtape, three extended play, 115 singles (including 42 as a featured artist), and ten promotional singles.

== Albums ==
=== Studio albums ===
List of studio albums, with selected details, chart positions, sales, and certifications
Title	Details	Peak chart positions										Sales	Certifications
Title	Details	ARG	BEL (WA)	FRA	GER	ITA	MEX	SPA	SWI	US	US Latin	Sales	Certifications
Magia	Released: August 7, 2012; Label: Sony Music Colombia; Formats: CD, digital download	—	—	—	—	—	—	—	—	—	—		ASINCOL: Gold
Pretty Boy, Dirty Boy	Released: October 30, 2015; Label: Sony Latin; Formats: CD, digital download	8	—	—	—	—	2	2	—	—	1	US: 27,000 (Note: Sales of Pretty Boy, Dirty Boy in the United States as of May 2018.)	ASINCOL: Diamond; AMPROFON: 4× Platinum; FIMI: Gold; IFPI CHI: 2× Platinum; RIAA: Diamond (Latin)
F.A.M.E.	Released: May 18, 2018; Label: Sony Latin; Formats: CD, digital download	6	58	111	74	16	10	6	12	37	1	US: 10,000 (Note: Sales of F.A.M.E. in the United States as of June 28, 2018.)	ASINCOL: 3× Platinum; AMPROFON: 4× Platinum; FIMI: Gold; RIAA: 14× Platinum (Latin)
11:11	Released: May 17, 2019; Label: Sony Latin; Formats: CD, digital download, streaming	7	49	68	77	20	9	6	6	30	1		AMPROFON: 4× Platinum+Gold; FIMI: Gold; RIAA: 9× Platinum (Latin)
Papi Juancho	Released: August 21, 2020; Label: Sony Latin; Formats: Digital download, streaming	—	152	132	—	48	—	2	22	34	2		AMPROFON: 4× Platinum; PROMUSICAE: Gold; RIAA: 12× Platinum (Latin)
Don Juan	Released: August 25, 2023; Label: Sony Latin; Formats: Digital download, streaming	—	—	187	—	—	—	7	—	195	11		PROMUSICAE: Gold; RIAA: 5× Platinum (Latin)
Loco X Volver	Released: May 15, 2026; Label: Sony Latin; Formats: Digital download, streaming	—	—	—	—	—	—	37	—	—	—		
"—" denotes a recording that did not chart or was not released in that territory.

=== Soundtrack albums ===
List of soundtrack albums, with selected details
Title	Album details	Peak chart positions	
Title	Album details	SPA	US
Marry Me (with Jennifer Lopez)	Released: February 4, 2022; Label: Sony Latin, Arista; Formats: CD, digital download, streaming	90	135

=== Mixtapes ===
List of mixtapes with selected details
Title	Mixtape details
PB.DB The Mixtape	Released: January 13, 2015; Label: Sony Music Colombia; Formats: CD, digital download

== EPs ==
List of EPs with selected details
Title	EP details	Peaks			Certifications
Title	EP details	SPA	US Latin	US Reggae	Certifications
7 Días en Jamaica	Released: January 28, 2021; Label: Sony Latin; Formats: Digital download, streaming	14	14	2	RIAA: Gold (Latin)
The Love & Sex Tape	Released: June 10, 2022; Label: Sony Latin; Formats: Digital download, streaming	36	16	—	RIAA: Platinum (Latin)
1 of 1 (with Blessd)	Released: June 6, 2024; Label: Sony Latin; Formats: Digital download, streaming	—	—	—	
"—" denotes a recording that did not chart or was not released in that territory.

== Singles ==
=== As lead artist ===
==== 2010s ====
List of singles released in the 2010s decade as lead artist, showing selected chart positions, certifications, and associated albums
Title	Year	Peak chart positions									Certifications	Album
Title	Year	COL	ARG	FRA	ITA	MEX	SPA	SWI	US	US Latin	Certifications	Album
"Farandulera"	2011	—	—	—	—	—	—	—	—	—		Magia
"Loco"	2011	—	—	—	—	—	—	—	—	—		Magia
"Obsesión"	2012	—	—	—	—	—	—	—	—	—		Magia
"Magia"	2012	—	—	—	—	—	—	—	—	—		Magia
"Pasarla Bien"	2012	—	—	—	—	—	—	—	—	—		Magia
"Miss Independent"	2012	2	—	—	—	—	—	—	—	—		Magia
"La Temperatura" (featuring Eli Palacios)	2013	7	—	—	—	— (Note: "La Temperatura" did not enter the Mexico Airplay chart, but peaked at number 36 on the Mexican Espanol Airplay chart.)	30	—	—	24	PROMUSICAE: Platinum	PB.DB. The Mixtape
"La Curiosidad"	2014	—	—	—	—	—	—	—	—	48		PB.DB. The Mixtape
"Carnaval"	2014	8	—	—	—	6	—	—	—	— (Note: "Carnaval" did not enter the Billboard Hot Latin Songs, but peaked at number 20 on the Latin Rhythm Airplay songs chart.)	AMPROFON: 3× Platinum+Gold	PB.DB. The Mixtape
"Addicted"	2014	—	—	—	—	—	—	—	—	—		PB.DB. The Mixtape
"Intentalo"	2014	—	—	—	—	—	—	—	—	—		Non-album single
"El Tiki"	2015	2	—	—	—	—	53	—	—	— (Note: "El Tiki" did not enter the Billboard Hot Latin Songs, but peaked at number 50 on the Latin Digital Song Sales chart and at number 15 on the Latin Rhythm Airplay songs chart.)		Pretty Boy, Dirty Boy
"Borró Cassette"	2015	1	4	—	—	21	23	—	—	3	AMPROFON: 2× Diamond+4× Platinum; CAPIF: Platinum; FIMI: Gold; PROMUSICAE: 4× Platinum	Pretty Boy, Dirty Boy
"El Perdedor" (Note: Three versions of "El Perdedor" were released as singles: the original solo version, the one featuring Yandel, and the one featuring Bruninho & Davi.)	2016	1	2	—	—	1	24	—	— (Note: "El Perdedor" did not enter the Billboard Hot 100, but peaked at number 25 on the Bubbling Under Hot 100 Singles chart, which acts as an extension to the Hot 100.)	4	AMPROFON: Diamond+3× Platinum+Gold; FIMI: Gold; PROMUSICAE: 2× Platinum	Pretty Boy, Dirty Boy
"Sin Contrato" (Note: Three versions of "Sin Contrato" were released as singles: the original solo version, the one featuring Fifth Harmony, and the one featuring Don Omar and Wisin.)	2016	3	17	—	—	6	52	—	—	7	AMPROFON: Diamond+Platinum+Gold; FIMI: Gold; PROMUSICAE: Platinum	Pretty Boy, Dirty Boy
"Cuatro Babys" (featuring Noriel, Bryant Myers and Juhn)	2016	21	—	—	—	—	55	—	—	15	AMPROFON: Diamond; PROMUSICAE: Gold; RIAA: 12× Platinum (Latin)	Trap Capos: Season 1
"Felices los 4" (Note: A salsa version of the song featuring Marc Anthony was released on July 7, 2017.)	2017	2	1	35	48	1	2	39	48	2	AMPROFON: 2× Diamond+3× Platinum; AMPROFON: Platinum+Gold (Salsa version); CAPIF: 3× Platinum; FIMI: 2× Platinum; IFPI SWI: Platinum; PROMUSICAE: 6× Platinum; PROMUSICAE: 5× Platinum (Salsa version); RIAA: 44× Platinum (Latin); SNEP: Platinum	F.A.M.E.
"Corazón" (featuring Nego do Borel)	2017	2	1	184	70	1	3	50	87	5	AMPROFON: Diamond+3× Platinum; FIMI: Platinum; IFPI SWI: Platinum; PROMUSICAE: 2× Platinum; RIAA: 11× Platinum (Latin); SNEP: Gold	F.A.M.E.
"El Préstamo"	2018	7	6	168	74	1	10	68	— (Note: "El Prestamo" did not enter the Billboard Hot 100, but peaked at number eight on the Bubbling Under Hot 100 Singles chart, which acts as an extension to the Hot 100.)	10	AMPROFON: Diamond; FIMI: Gold; PROMUSICAE: Platinum; RIAA: 8× Platinum (Latin)	F.A.M.E.
"Bella" (Remix) (with Wolfine)	2018	4	16	—	—	5	—	—	— (Note: "Bella" did not enter the Billboard Hot 100, but peaked at number sixteen on the Bubbling Under Hot 100 Singles chart, which acts as an extension to the Hot 100.)	13		Super Hits
"Colors" (with Jason Derulo)	2018	—	— (Note: "Colors" did not enter the Argentina Airplay chart, but peaked at number 11 on the Argentine Anglo Airplay chart.)	—	—	—	—	—	—	—		2018 FIFA World Cup
"Clandestino" (with Shakira)	2018	1	8	79	76	1	13	32	— (Note: "Clandestino" did not enter the Billboard Hot 100, but peaked at number 15 on the Bubbling Under Hot 100 Singles chart, which acts as an extension to the Hot 100.)	7	AMPROFON: 4× Platinum+Gold; PROMUSICAE: 2× Platinum	Non-album singles
"Mala Mía" (Note: On December 21, 2018, a remix with Becky G and Anitta was released.)	2018	7	11	—	—	4	12	71	— (Note: "Mala Mia" did not enter the Billboard Hot 100, but peaked at number 23 on the Bubbling Under Hot 100 Singles chart, which acts as an extension to the Hot 100.)	9	AMPROFON: Diamond; FIMI: Gold; PROMUSICAE: 2× Platinum; RIAA: 5× Platinum (Latin)	Non-album singles
"Amigos Con Derechos" (with Reik)	2018	2	8	—	—	1	26	—	—	14	AMPROFON: 2× Diamond; PROMUSICAE: Platinum; RIAA: 8× Platinum (Latin)	Ahora
"Créeme" (with Karol G)	2018	25	12	—	—	— (Note: "Créeme" did not enter the Mexico Airplay chart, but peaked at number 29 on the Mexican Espanol Airplay chart.)	33	—	— (Note: "Créeme" did not enter the Billboard Hot 100, but peaked at number 20 on the Bubbling Under Hot 100 Singles chart, which acts as an extension to the Hot 100.)	11	PROMUSICAE: Platinum; RIAA: 3× Platinum (Latin)	Ocean
"Vivir Bailando" (with Silvestre Dangond)	2019	3	—	—	—	— (Note: "Vivir Bailando" did not enter the Mexico Airplay chart, but peaked at number 27 on the Mexican Espanol Airplay chart.)	—	—	—	41	AMPROFON: Gold; RIAA: 2× Platinum (Latin)	Intruso
"HP"	2019	2	6	—	26	1	4	48	96	8	AMPROFON: 2× Diamond+Gold; FIMI: Platinum; IFPI SWI: Gold; PROMUSICAE: 2× Platinum; RIAA: 11× Platinum (Latin); SNEP: Gold	11:11
"Medellín" (with Madonna)	2019	32	57	11	37	— (Note: "Medellín" did not enter the Mexico Airplay chart, but peaked at number 19 on the Mexican Espanol Airplay chart.)	67	69	—	18	FIMI: Gold	Madame X
"La Respuesta" (with Becky G)	2019	—	24	—	—	— (Note: "La Respuesta" did not chart on the Billboard Mexico Airplay chart, though did peak at number 20 on the Mexico Espanol Airplay chart.)	29	—	—	13	AMPROFON: Platinum+Gold; PROMUSICAE: Gold	Non-album single
"Hola Señorita" (with Gims)	2019	—	—	15	—	—	23	12	—	—	BEA: Gold; IFPI SWI: Platinum; PROMUSICAE: Platinum; SNEP: Diamond	Ceinture noire
"11 PM"	2019	2	6	—	95	1	13	50	— (Note: "11 PM" did not enter the Billboard Hot 100, but peaked at number 14 on the Bubbling Under Hot 100 Singles chart, which acts as an extension to the Hot 100.)	11	AMPROFON: 2× Diamond+2× Platinum; FIMI: Gold; IFPI SWI: Gold; PROMUSICAE: 2× Platinum; RIAA: 7× Platinum (Latin); SNEP: Gold	11:11
"Instinto Natural" (featuring Sech)	2019	—	76	—	—	—	—	—	—	—	AMPROFON: Gold	11:11
"No Se Me Quita" (featuring Ricky Martin)	2019	—	26	—	—	1	—	—	—	— (Note: "No Se Me Quita" did not enter the Billboard Hot Latin Songs, but peaked at number nineteen on the Latin Digital Song Sales chart.)	AMPROFON: 4× Platinum; RIAA: Platinum (Latin)	11:11
"Qué Pena" (with J Balvin)	2019	1	27	—	—	13	21	60	—	13	AMPROFON: 3× Platinum; PROMUSICAE: Gold	Non-album singles
"Así Así" (with Fariana)	2019	—	—	—	—	—	—	—	—	— (Note: "Así Así" did not enter the Billboard Hot Latin Songs chart, but peaked at number 27 on the Latin Pop Songs chart.)	RIAA: Gold (Latin)	Non-album singles
"—" denotes a recording that did not chart or was not released in that territory.

==== 2020s ====
List of singles released in the 2020s decade as lead artist, showing selected chart positions, certifications, and associated albums
Title	Year	Peak chart positions										Certifications	Album
Title	Year	COL	ARG	FRA	ITA	MEX	SPA	SWI	US	US Latin	WW	Certifications	Album
"Maldad" (with Steve Aoki)	2020	—	—	—	—	—	—	—	—	— (Note: "Maldad" did not enter the Billboard Hot Latin Songs chart, but peaked at number 20 on the Latin Pop Songs chart.)	—		Neon Future IV
"ADMV"	2020	1	33	—	—	1	52	—	—	14	165	AMPROFON: Diamond+2× Platinum+Gold; PROMUSICAE: Platinum; RIAA: Gold (Latin)	Papi Juancho
"Feel the Beat" (with Black Eyed Peas)	2020	—	99	—	—	29	94	74	—	— (Note: "Feel the Beat" did not enter the Billboard Hot Latin Songs chart, but peaked at number 35 on the Latin Pop Songs chart.)	—		Translation
"Hawái" (Note: A remix with The Weeknd was released on November 5, 2020.)	2020	1	1	86	41	1	1 (Note: In Spain, the remix version of "Hawái" featuring The Weeknd charted separatedly from its original version and peaked at number 39.)	8	12	1	3	AMPROFON: 4× Diamond+2× Platinum; AMPROFON: Platinum (Remix); FIMI: Platinum (Remix); IFPI SWI: Gold; PROMUSICAE: 6× Platinum; RIAA: 4× Diamond (Latin); RIAA: 22× Platinum (Latin) (Remix); SNEP: Platinum	Papi Juancho
"Parce" (featuring Lenny Tavárez and Justin Quiles)	2020	15	11	—	—	—	32	—	—	— (Note: "Parce" did not enter the Billboard Hot Latin Songs chart, but peaked at number eleven on the Latin Digital Song Sales chart.)	49	AMPROFON: Diamond; PROMUSICAE: Platinum	Papi Juancho
"Pa' Ti" (with Jennifer Lopez)	2020	14	68	—	—	41	57	74	— (Note: "Pa Ti" did not enter the Billboard Hot 100, but peaked at number 25 on the Bubbling Under Hot 100 Singles chart, which acts as an extension to the Hot 100.)	9	106	AMPROFON: Gold; RIAA: 3× Platinum (Latin)	Marry Me
"Madrid" (with Myke Towers)	2020	—	81	—	—	—	19	—	—	41	193	AMPROFON: 2× Platinum+Gold; PROMUSICAE: Gold	Papi Juancho
"Agua de Jamaica"	2021	4	—	—	—	17	32	—	—	28	— (Note: "Agua de Jamaica" did not enter the Billboard Global 200 chart, but peaked at number 186 on the Global Excl. US chart.)	AMPROFON: Gold; RIAA: 3× Platinum (Latin)	7 Días en Jamaica
"Sobrio"	2021	1	13	—	—	2	34	81	— (Note: "Sobrio" did not enter the Billboard Hot 100, but peaked at number nine on the Bubbling Under Hot 100 Singles chart, which acts as an extension to the Hot 100.)	11	52	AMPROFON: 2× Platinum; PROMUSICAE: Platinum; RIAA: 6× Platinum (Latin)	Don Juan
"L.N.E.M. (Gata)" (featuring Blessd, Kapla y Miky, and Philip Arias)	2021	—	—	—	—	—	—	—	—	—	—		Non-album single
"Imposible Amor" (with Natti Natasha)	2021	—	93	—	—	2	—	—	—	34	—		Nattividad
"Sukutubla" (with Lalo Ebratt)	2021	7	—	—	—	—	—	—	—	—	—		Non-album single
"Mama Tetema" (featuring Rayvanny)	2021	4	—	—	—	1	—	—	—	— (Note: "Mama Tetema" did not enter the Billboard Hot Latin Songs, but peaked at number 12 on the Latin Digital Song Sales chart.)	—	RIAA: Gold (Latin)	Don Juan
"Cositas de la USA"	2022	—	72	—	—	—	73	—	—	44	—	RIAA: Gold (Latin)	The Love & Sex Tape
"Marry Me" (with Jennifer Lopez)	2022	—	—	—	—	34	—	—	—	—	—		Marry Me
"Mojando Asientos" (featuring Feid)	2022	9	95	—	—	—	—	—	—	—	—		The Love & Sex Tape
"Nos Comemos Vivos" (with Chencho Corleone)	2022	—	—	—	—	—	86	—	—	47	—		The Love & Sex Tape
"Nunca y Pico" (with Yandel and Eladio Carrión)	2022	—	—	—	—	—	—	—	—	— (Note: "Nunca y Pico" did not enter the Billboard Hot Latin Songs, but peaked at number 15 on the Latin Digital Song Sales chart.)	—		Resistencia
"Tsunami" (with Arcángel and De La Ghetto)	2022	—	—	—	—	—	—	—	—	—	—		The Love & Sex Tape
"El Que Espera" (with Anitta)	2022	—	91	—	—	—	—	—	—	— (Note: "No Se Me Quita" did not enter the Billboard Hot Latin Songs, but peaked at number 16 on the Latin Digital Song Sales chart.)	—		Versions of Me
"28"	2022	—	—	—	—	—	—	—	—	—	—		The Love & Sex Tape
"Junio"	2022	1	39	—	—	—	—	—	—	28	—	PROMUSICAE: Gold	Don Juan
"Ojala" (with The Rudeboyz and Adam Levine)	2022	—	—	—	—	—	—	—	—	— (Note: "Ojala" did not enter the Billboard Hot Latin Songs chart, but peaked at number 9 on the Latin Digital Song Sales chart.)	—		Non-album single
"Tukoh Taka" (with Nicki Minaj and Myriam Fares)	2022	—	—	—	—	—	—	—	—	18	106		2022 FIFA World Cup
"La Fórmula" (with Marc Anthony)	2023	1	69	—	—	—	83	—	—	— (Note: "La Fórmula" did not enter the Billboard Hot Latin Songs chart, but peaked at number 7 on the Latin Digital Song Sales chart.)	—		Don Juan
"La Reina"	2023	—	—	—	—	—	—	—	—	— (Note: "La Reina" did not enter the Billboard Hot Latin Songs chart, but peaked at number 19 on the Latin Digital Song Sales chart.)	—		Don Juan
"Diablo, Qué Chimba" (with Anuel AA)	2023	—	—	—	—	—	66	—	—	45	—		Don Juan
"Coco Loco"	2023	—	50	90	—	—	10	—	—	41	—	PROMUSICAE: 4× Platinum; SNEP: Gold	Don Juan
"Celular" (with Nicky Jam and The Chainsmokers)	2023	—	—	—	—	—	—	—	—	—	—		Summertime Friends
"Parcera" (with Gordo)	2023	—	—	—	—	—	—	—	—	—	—		Don Juan
"Según Quién" (with Carín León)	2023	2	52	—	—	5	54	—	65	5	17	AMPROFON: 4× Platinum+Gold; PROMUSICAE: Platinum; RIAA: 13× Platinum (Latin)	Don Juan
"Trofeo" (with Yandel)	2023	—	—	—	—	—	—	—	—	—	—		Don Juan
"Gafas Negras" (with J Balvin)	2024	—	—	—	—	—	—	—	—	—	—		Don Juan
"Bling Bling" (with Grupo Marca Registrada and Octavio Cuadras)	2024	—	—	—	—	—	—	—	—	39	—		Non-album singles
"Lollipop" (Remix) (with Darell and Ozuna)	2024	4	2	—	—	—	39	—	—	26	34	PROMUSICAE: Gold; RIAA: Gold (Latin)	Non-album singles
"Por Qué Será" (with Grupo Frontera)	2024	—	—	—	—	—	—	—	—	14	—		Jugando a Que No Pasa Nada
"Contrato"	2024	—	—	—	—	—	18	—	—	— (Note: "Contrato" did not enter the Billboard Hot Latin Songs chart, but peaked at number 6 on the Billboard Latin Airplay chart.)	—		Non-album singles
"Cosas Pendientes"	2024	5	75	—	—	—	21	—	—	37	141		Non-album singles
"Si Tú Me Vieras" (with Carín León)	2025	—	—	—	—	—	—	—	—	50	—		Palabra de To's (Seca)
"Bronceador"	2025	—	—	—	—	—	97	—	—	22	—		Non-album singles
"Un Polvito+" (with Maisak)	2025	—	—	—	—	—	—	—	—	—	—		Non-album singles
"1+1" (with Kany García)	2026	—	54	—	—	—	—	—	—	31	—		Loco X Volver
"Con el Corazon" (with Yeison Jiménez)	2026	—	—	—	—	—	—	—	—	—	—		Non-album single
"Apambichao" (with Manuel Turizo)	2026	—	—	—	—	—	66	—	—	—	—		Apambichao
"Botero" (with Arcángel and NTG)	2026	—	—	—	—	—	—	—	—	—	—		Loco X Volver
"Pa'la seca" (with Ryan Castro)	2026	—	—	—	—	—	—	—	—	—	—		Loco X Volver
"—" denotes a recording that did not chart or was not released in that territory.

=== As featured artist ===
List of singles as featured artist, with selected chart positions and certifications, showing year released and album name
Title	Year	Peak chart positions										Certifications	Album
Title	Year	COL	ARG	FRA	ITA	MEX	SPA	SWE	SWI	US	US Latin	Certifications	Album
"Te Viví" (Villamizar featuring Maluma, Elvis Crespo and J.B.D)	2014	—	—	—	—	—	—	—	—	—	43		El Día Que Vuelva
"Olé Brazil" (Elvis Crespo featuring Maluma)	2014	—	—	—	—	—	—	—	—	—	49		Tatuaje
"Salgamos" (Kevin Roldan featuring Maluma and Andy Rivera)	2014	—	—	—	—	—	—	—	—	—	—		The Beginning
"La Invitación" (Pipe Bueno featuring Maluma)	2014	—	—	—	—	17	—	—	—	—	—		Non-album singles
"Ella Es Mi Fiesta" (Remix) (Carlos Vives featuring Maluma)	2015	—	—	—	—	—	—	—	—	—	—		Non-album singles
"Fiesta de Verano" (Maía featuring Maluma)	2015	—	—	—	—	—	—	—	—	—	—		Maía
"Bandida" (Danny Romero featuring Maluma)	2015	—	—	—	—	—	16	—	—	—	—	PROMUSICAE: Platinum	11:11
"Me Curaré" (Remix) (Justin Quiles featuring Maluma)	2015	—	—	—	—	—	88	—	—	—	—		Non-album singles
"Aventura" (Remix) (Tomas the Latin Boy featuring Maluma)	2015	—	—	—	—	— (Note: "Aventura (Remix)" did not enter the Mexico Airplay chart, but peaked at number 43 on the Mexican Espanol Airplay chart.)	—	—	—	—	— (Note: "Aventura (Remix)" did not enter the Billboard Hot Latin Songs, but peaked at number 23 on the Latin Pop Songs and at number 40 on the Latin Airplay chart.)		The Latin Boy
"Un Beso" (Remix) (Baby Rasta & Gringo featuring Maluma)	2016	—	—	—	—	—	96	—	—	—	—		Non-album single
"Desde Esa Noche" (Thalía featuring Maluma)	2016	—	4	—	—	20	68	—	—	—	16	AMPROFON: Diamond+2× Platinum+Gold; PROMUSICAE: Platinum; RIAA: 2× Platinum (Latin)	Latina
"Aire" (Leslie Grace featuring Maluma)	2016	—	—	—	—	—	—	—	—	—	— (Note: "Aire" did not enter the Billboard Hot Latin Songs, but peaked at number 25 on the Latin Pop Songs)		Non-album singles
"Sim ou Não" / "Sí o No" (Anitta featuring Maluma)	2016	—	—	—	—	42	—	—	—	—	—	PMB: 2× Diamond ("Sim ou Não"); PMB: Gold ("Sí o No")	Non-album singles
"La Fila" (Luny Tunes featuring Don Omar, Maluma and Sharlene)	2016	—	—	—	—	—	88	—	—	—	— (Note: "La Fila" did not enter the Billboard Hot Latin Songs, but peaked at number 36 on the Latin Digital Song Sales chart.)		Mas Flow 3
"Vente Pa' Ca" (Ricky Martin featuring Maluma)	2016	2	1	171	65	1	2	—	72	— (Note: "Vente Pa' Ca" did not enter the Billboard Hot 100, but peaked at number 25 on the Bubbling Under Hot 100 Singles chart, which acts as an extension to the Hot 100.)	4	AMPROFON: Diamond+3× Platinum+Gold; CAPIF: Gold; FIMI: Platinum; PROMUSICAE: 4× Platinum; SNEP: Gold	Non-album single
"Sobre Mí" (Sin Bandera featuring Maluma)	2016	—	—	—	—	19	—	—	—	—	—		Una Última Vez
"Chantaje" (Shakira featuring Maluma)	2016	2	4	17	11	3	1	54	10	51	1	AMPROFON: Diamond+3× Platinum+Gold; CAPIF: 3× Platinum; FIMI: 3× Platinum; GLF: Platinum; IFPI SWI: Platinum; PROMUSICAE: 5× Platinum; RIAA: 16× Platinum (Latin); SNEP: Diamond	El Dorado
"Me Llamas" (Remix) (Piso 21 featuring Maluma)	2016	9	12	—	—	37	21	—	—	—	32	CAPIF: 2× Platinum; FIMI: Gold; PROMUSICAE: 3× Platinum; RIAA: 6× Platinum (Latin)	Non-album single
"Vivo Pensando en Tí" (Felipe Peláez featuring Maluma)	2017	3	—	—	—	27	—	—	—	—	— (Note: "Vivo Pensando en Tí" did not enter the Billboard Hot Latin Songs chart, but peaked at number 32 on the Latin Pop Songs chart. and at number 22 on the Tropical Airplay chart.)	AMPROFON: Gold; RIAA: 2× Platinum (Latin)	Ponle Actitud
"Solo a Solas" (Cosculluela featuring Maluma)	2017	23	—	—	—	— (Note: "Solo a Solas" did not enter the Mexico Airplay chart, but peaked at number 43 on the Mexican Espanol Airplay chart.)	97	—	—	—	— (Note: "Solo a Solas" did not enter the Billboard Hot Latin Songs chart, but peaked at number 22 on the Latin Pop Airplay chart.)	RIAA: Platinum (Latin)	Non-album singles
"Hola" (Flo Rida featuring Maluma)	2017	—	—	—	—	33	—	—	60	—	—		Non-album singles
"Trap" (Shakira featuring Maluma)	2018	—	—	—	—	25	—	—	—	—	17	AMPROFON: Platinum	El Dorado
"Sólo Mía" (Yandel featuring Maluma)	2018	98	—	—	—	— (Note: "Sólo Mía" did not enter the Mexico Airplay chart, but peaked at number 39 on the Mexican Espanol Airplay chart.)	50	—	—	—	31	RIAA: 5× Platinum (Latin)	Update
"Hands on Me" (Burns featuring Maluma and Rae Sremmurd)	2018	—	—	—	—	—	—	—	—	—	—		Non-album singles
"Todo El Amor" (De la Ghetto featuring Maluma and Wisin)	2018	47	—	—	—	—	—	—	—	—	40		Mi Movimiento
"El Clavo" (Remix) (Prince Royce featuring Maluma)	2018	—	18	—	—	49	72	—	—	—	13		Alter Ego
"Arms Around You" (XXXTentacion and Lil Pump featuring Maluma and Swae Lee)	2018	—	62	25	13	—	35	8	5	28	—	FIMI: Platinum; RIAA: Platinum; SNEP: Gold	Non-album single
"Qué Más Pues" (Remix) (Sech featuring Maluma, Nicky Jam, Farruko, Justin Quiles, Dalex and Lenny Tavarez)	2019	—	12	—	—	—	18	—	—	—	—	PROMUSICAE: Platinum; RIAA: Platinum (Latin)	Sueños
"Latina" (Reykon featuring Maluma)	2019	16	72	—	—	42	79	—	—	—	35	RIAA: Platinum (Latin)	Non-album singles
"Fresh Kerias" (with Feid & Sky)	2019	18	—	—	—	—	—	—	—	—	—		Non-album singles
"Porfa" (Remix) (Feid and Justin Quiles featuring J Balvin, Nicky Jam and Sech)	2020	6	7	—	—	—	—	—	—	—	11	AMPROFON: 2× Platinum	Bahía Ducati
"Djadja" (Remix) (Note: PROMUSICAE chart positions and certifications are based upon both the original and remix version of "Djadja".) (Aya Nakamura featuring Maluma)	2020	26	23	—	23	—	5	—	—	—	43	FIMI : Gold; PROMUSICAE : 3× Platinum	Nakamura
"100 Años" (Carlos Rivera with Maluma)	2020	29	—	—	—	1	—	—	—	—	38		Crónicas de una Guerra
"Más De La Una" (Piso 21 with Maluma)	2020	11	74	—	—	8	—	—	—	—	34	RIAA: Gold (Latin)	El Amor en Los Tiempos del Perreo
"Mi Niña" (Remix) (Wisin with Maluma and Myke Towers featuring Anitta)	2021	—	—	—	—	—	83	—	—	—	—	RIAA: Platinum (Latin)	Non-album singles
"Aloha" (DJ Luian and Mambo Kingz featuring Maluma, Rauw Alejandro, Beéle and Darell)	2021	10	—	—	—	—	11	—	—	—	49	PROMUSICAE : Platinum; RIAA: 6× Platinum (Latin)	Non-album singles
"Amor en Coma" (Manuel Turizo featuring Maluma)	2021	2	31	—	—	1	48	—	—	—	24		Dopamina
"Perfecta" (Reik with Maluma)	2021	—	29	—	—	1	76	—	—	—	33	AMPROFON: Platinum	Non-album single
"La Botella" (Justin Quiles featuring Maluma)	2021	—	—	—	—	43	25	—	—	—	—	PROMUSICAE: Platinum; RIAA: Platinum (Latin)	La Última Promesa
"Tá OK" (Remix) (Dennis and Kevin O Chris featuring Maluma and Karol G)	2023	—	—	—	—	—	77	—	—	—	—		Non-album singles
"OA" (DJ Luian and Mambo Kingz featuring Maluma, Anuel AA and Quevedo)	2023	—	—	—	—	—	5	—	—	—	—	PROMUSICAE: 2× Platinum; RIAA: 4× Platinum (Latin)	Non-album singles
"+57" (Karol G, Feid and DFZM featuring Ovy on the Drums, J Balvin, Maluma, Ryan Castro and Blessd)	2024	1	62	—	—	—	4	—	82	62	4	PROMUSICAE: Gold	Non-album singles
"Cuerpo (Tumbao)" (Beyoncé featuring Maluma)	2026	—	—	—	—	—	—	—	—	(Note: "Cuerpo (Tumbao)" did not enter the Billboard Hot 100, but peaked at number 3 on the Billboard Hot Tropical Songs chart.)	44		B'Day 20th Anniversary Edition
"—" denotes a recording that did not chart or was not released in that territory.

=== Promotional singles ===
List of songs, with selected chart positions, showing year released and album name
Title	Year	Peaks								Certifications	Album
Title	Year	COL	ARG	BOL	SPA	US Latin	US Latin Airplay	US Latin Digital	US Latin Pop	Certifications	Album
"Un Polvo" (featuring Bad Bunny, Arcángel, De La Ghetto and Ñengo Flow)	2016	—	—	—	—	—	—	—	—		Non-album singles
"Me Gusta (Remix)" (with Alkilados)	2017	—	—	—	—	—	—	—	—		Non-album singles
"GPS" (featuring French Montana)	2017	—	—	—	84	35	—	14	—	AMPROFON: 3× Platinum+Gold; RIAA: 4× Platinum (Latin)	X (The Film)
"Vitamina" (featuring Arcángel)	2017	—	—	—	—	49	—	13	—	AMPROFON: Gold	X (The Film)
"23"	2017	—	—	—	—	—	—	—	—	AMPROFON: Platinum	X (The Film)
"Marinero"	2018	—	79	13	51	27	49	13	31	AMPROFON: 3× Platinum	F.A.M.E.
"Let's Summer (Veraneemos)" (featuring Lellêzinha)	2018	—	—	—	—	—	—	—	—		Non-album single
"La Luz" (with Wisin & Yandel)	2018	—	—	—	—	—	—	9	—	RIAA: Platinum (Latin)	Los Campeones del Pueblo "The Big Leagues"
"Déjale Saber"	2019	—	—	—	—	—	—	—	—		11:11
"Lonely" (with Jennifer Lopez)	2020	—	—	—	—	—	—	2	—		Non-album single
"—" denotes a recording that did not chart or was not released in that territory.

== Other charted songs ==
List of songs, with chart positions and certifications, showing year released and album name
Title	Year	Peak chart positions								Certifications	Album
Title	Year	ARG	BOL	CAN	SPA	US	US Latin	US Latin Digital	WW	Certifications	Album
"Una Aventura" (featuring Alexis & Fido)	2015	—	—	—	80	—	—	—	—		Pretty Boy, Dirty Boy
"Hangover" (featuring Prince Royce)	2018	—	10	—	98	—	—	—	—		F.A.M.E.
"X" (Remix) (Nicky Jam and J Balvin featuring Maluma and Ozuna)	2018	—	—	—	15	—	—	—	—	PROMUSICAE: Platinum	Non-album single
"Dispuesto" (featuring Ozuna)	2019	—	—	—	92	—	47	—	—	AMPROFON: Gold	11:11
"Soltera" (featuring Madonna)	2019	—	—	—	—	—	—	7	—		11:11
"Tu Vecina" (featuring Ty Dolla Sign)	2019	—	—	—	—	—	—	13	—		11:11
"Bitch I'm Loca" (Madonna featuring Maluma)	2019	—	—	—	—	—	—	16	—		Madame X
"La Playa (Remix)" (with Myke Towers and Farruko)	2020	46	—	—	64	—	—	13	—	RIAA: 3× Platinum (Latin)	Non-album singles
"Qué Chimba"	2020	—	—	—	—	—	— (Note: "Qué Chimba" did not enter the Billboard Hot Latin Songs chart, but peaked at number 21 on the Latin Digital Song Sales chart.)	—	—	AMPROFON: Gold	Non-album singles
"Tónika" (featuring Ziggy Marley)	2021	—	—	—	—	—	—	6	—		7 Días en Jamaica
"Peligrosa"	2021	—	—	—	—	—	—	22	—		7 Días en Jamaica
"All of You" (with Stephanie Beatriz, Olga Merediz, John Leguizamo, Adassa, and Encanto cast)	2021	—	—	83	—	71	—	—	111		Encanto
"—" denotes a recording that did not chart or was not released in that territory.

== Other appearances ==
List of guest appearances showing year released and album name
Title	Year	Other performer(s)	Album
"Dime Que Te Parece"	2011	Landa Freak	None
"Con Flow Mátalo"	2012	J Balvin, Reykon, Kevin Roldan, Jay & El Punto, Dragón & Caballero	None
"Te Quiero Amar" (Remix)	2013	Pasabordo	None
"Bésame"	2013	Kafu Banton	None
"Se Acaba el Tiempo" (Remix)	2013	Maximus Wel, J Alvarez	None
"No Voy a Beber Mas" (Remix)	2013	Alberto Stylee	None
"Juegos Prohibidos" (Remix)	2013	Nicky Jam	None
"Amor En Practica" (Remix)	2014	J Alvarez, Jory, Ken-Y	None
"Tus Besos" (Remix)	2014	El Indio	None
"Princesinha" (Live)	2014	Lucas Lucco	O Destino - Ao Vivo
"Ella Es Mi Fiesta" (Remix)	2015	Carlos Vives	None
"Sólo Tú"	2015	Arcángel, DJ Luian	Los Favoritos
"Que Sí, Que No"	2016	Kevin Ortiz	Mi Vicio y Mi Adicción
"El Tiempo" (Remix)	2016	Axcel y Andrew, J Alvarez	Los Brothers
"Make My Love Go" (Remix)	2016	Jay Sean, Sean Paul	None
"Quédate Lejos" (live)	2016	Ha*Ash	Primera Fila: Hecho Realidad
"La Bicicleta" (Remix)	2016	Carlos Vives, Shakira	None
"Trap"	2017	Shakira	El Dorado
"Sólo Mía"	2017	Yandel	Update
"El Clavo" (Remix)	2018	Prince Royce	None
"Magdalena"	2023	Don Omar	Forever King

== Videography ==
List of music videos, showing year released and directors
Title	Year	Other artist(s)	Director(s)	Ref.
As lead artist
"Farandulera"	2011	None		
"Loco"	2011	None		
"Obsesión"	2011	None		
"Magia"	2012	None		
"Pasarla Bien"	2012	None	36 Grados	
"Miss Independent"	2013	None	36 Grados	
"La Temperatura"	2013	Eli Palacios	Harold Jimenez	
"La Curiosidad"	2014	None		
"Addicted" (Lyric Video)	2014	None		
"Carnaval" (Lyric Video)	2014	None		
"Addicted"	2014	None	Harold Jimenez	
"Carnaval"	2014	None	Harold Jimenez	
"El Tiki" (Lyric Video)	2015	None		
"Borro Cassette" (Lyric Video)	2015	None	Ulysses Terrero; Jessy Terrero	
"Borro Cassette"	2015	None		
"El Perdedor"	2016	None	Jessy Terrero	
"Sin Contrato"	2016	None		
As featured artist
"Vente Pa' Ca"	2016	Ricky Martin	Jessy Terrero	
As lead artist
"Cuatro Babys"	2016	Noriel, Bryant Myers, Juhn	Jose Javy Ferrer	
As featured artist
"Chantaje"	2016	Shakira	Jaume de Laiguana	
As lead artist
"Felices Los 4"	2017	Original version (solo) & Salsa version (Marc Anthony)	Jessy Terrero	
"Corazón"	2017	Nego do Borel	Jessy Terrero	
