= Pretty Boy, Dirty Boy World Tour =

2016–17 concert tour by Maluma

Maluma World Tour
- Tour by Maluma
- Location: North America • South America • Europe • Asia
- Associated album: Pretty Boy, Dirty Boy
- Start date: May 14, 2016
- End date: December 15, 2017
- Legs: 12
- No. of shows: 111 in Latin America; 23 in Europe; 16 in North America; 1 in Asia (Israel); 151 in Total

Maluma concert chronology
- Maluma World Tour (2016–2017); F.A.M.E Tour (2018)

The Maluma World Tour was the first headlining concert tour by Colombian reggaeton singer Maluma, in support of his second studio album, Pretty Boy, Dirty Boy (2015). The tour, which visited cities across Latin America, Spain, Europe, Israel, the Caribbean, Canada and the United States, began on May 14, 2016 in Ciudad Juárez, Chihuahua, Mexico at the Estadio Carta Blanca, and ended on December 15, 2017 in Mexico City at the Mexico City Arena.

== Opening acts ==
- Nikky Mackliff (Quito — July 9, 2016 date)
- Rocko & Blasty (Quito — July 9, 2016 date)
- Danny Romero (Spain — 2016 selected dates)
- Miss Bolivia (Buenos Aires — December 1, 2017 date)
- Jimena Barón (Buenos Aires — December 3, 2017 date)

== Set list ==
This set list is representative of the show on December 11, 2016 in Buenos Aires, Argentina. It is not representative of all concerts for the duration of the tour.

1. "Borró Cassette"
2. "Sin Contrato"
3. "El Perdedor"
4. "La Curiosidad"
5. "Vente Pa' Ca"
6. "Desde Esa Noche"
7. "Addicted"
8. "El Tiki"
9. "Tengo Un Amor" / "Vuelo Hacia el Olvido"
10. "Salgamos"
11. "La Temperatura"
12. "Chantaje"
13. "La Bicicleta"
14. "Cuatro Babys"
15. "El Beso"
16. "La Invitación"
17. "Obsesión"
18. "Carnaval"

== Shows ==
List of concerts, showing date, city, country and venue
Date	City	Country	Venue	Attendance	Revenue
North America
May 14, 2016	Ciudad Juárez	Mexico	Estadio Carta Blanca	—	—
May 20, 2016	Xalapa	Mexico	Estadio de Béisbol Colón	—	—
May 21, 2016	Acapulco	Mexico	Forum de Mundo Imperial	—	—
May 22, 2016	Cancún	Mexico	Plaza de Toros	—	—
May 26, 2016	Monterrey	Mexico	Arena Monterrey	—	—
May 27, 2016	Querétaro City	Mexico	Plaza de Toros Santa María	—	—
May 28, 2016	Guadalajara	Mexico	Auditorio Telmex	—	—
May 29, 2016	Mexico City	Mexico	Auditorio Nacional	9,620 / 9,620	$428,466
May 30, 2016	Guadalajara	Mexico	Auditorio Telmex	—	—
June 3, 2016 (Note: The June 3, 2016 show at Figali Convention Center in Panama City was part of the 2016 Panamá Top Festival.)	Panama City	Panama	Figali Convention Center	—	—
June 5, 2016	Alajuela	Costa Rica	Parque Viva	—	—
South America
June 19, 2016	Santiago	Chile	Movistar Arena	—	—
June 21, 2016	Tucumán	Argentina	Estadio Central Córdoba	—	—
June 22, 2016	Salta	Argentina	Estadio Delmi	—	—
June 23, 2016 (Note: The June 23, 2016 show at City Center Rosario in Rosario included a matinee and evening show.)	Rosario	Argentina	City Center Rosario	—	—
June 26, 2016 (Note: The June 26, 2016 show at Quality Espacio in Córdoba included a matinee and evening show.)	Córdoba	Argentina	Quality Espacio	—	—
July 9, 2016 (Note: The July 9, 2016 show at Coliseo General Rumiñahui in Quito was shared with Joey Montana.)	Quito	Ecuador	Coliseo General Rumiñahui	—	—
North America
July 23, 2016 (Note: The July 23, 2016 show at Centro Internacional de Ferias y Convenciones in San Salvador was part of the 2016 Golden Fest.)	San Salvador	El Salvador	Centro Internacional de Ferias	—	—
July 30, 2016	Santo Domingo	Dominican Republic	Teatro La Fiesta	—	—
South America
August 13, 2016	Guayaquil	Ecuador	Parque Samanes	—	—
August 14, 2016 (Note: The August 14, 2016 show at Centro de Convenciones Cerro Juli in Arequipa was part of the 2016 Jardin de la Cerveza Music Festival.)	Arequipa	Peru	Centro de Convenciones	—	—
August 16, 2016	Buenos Aires	Argentina	Luna Park	—	—
August 17, 2016	Buenos Aires	Argentina	Luna Park	—	—
August 18, 2016	Buenos Aires	Argentina	Luna Park	—	—
August 20, 2016 (Note: The August 20, 2016 show at Estadio Miguel Grau in Callao was part of the 2016 Fiesta Internacional Chim Pum Callao.)	Callao	Peru	Estadio Miguel Grau	—	—
August 26, 2016 (Note: The August 26, 2016 show at Jardín de la Cerveza in Cusco was part of the 2016 Urban Fest Cusco.)	Cusco	Peru	Jardín de la Cerveza	—	—
August 27, 2016 (Note: The August 27, 2016 show at Estadio Monumental in Lima was part of the 2016 Juntos en Concierto Music Festival.)	Lima	Peru	Estadio Monumental	—	—
North America
October 31, 2016	San Pedro Sula	Honduras	Estadio Francisco Morazán	—	—
September 1, 2016	Tegucigalpa	Honduras	Estadio Chochi Sosa	—	—
September 2, 2016	Managua	Nicaragua	Terreno Pharaohs Casino	—	—
September 3, 2016	Guatemala City	Guatemala	Forum Majadas	—	—
South America
September 30, 2016	La Paz	Bolivia	Teatro al Aire Libre	—	—
October 1, 2016	Oruro	Bolivia	Palacio de Los Deportes	—	—
Europe
October 6, 2016	Madrid	Spain	Barclaycard Center	—	—
October 7, 2016	Barcelona	Spain	Sant Jordi Club	—	—
October 8, 2016	Valencia	Spain	Feria Valencia	—	—
October 10, 2016 (Note: The October 10, 2016 show at Parking Norte Expo in Zaragoza was part of the 2016 River Sound Festival Festival.)	Zaragoza	Spain	Parking Norte Expo	—	—
October 11, 2016	Málaga	Spain	Palacio de Ferias y Congresos	—	—
October 15, 2016	La Laguna	Spain	Pabellón Insular Santiago Martín	—	—
October 16, 2016	Las Palmas	Spain	Infecar	—	—
South America
October 19, 2016	Maracaibo	Venezuela	Palacio de Eventos	—	—
October 21, 2016	Valencia	Venezuela	Forum de Valencia	—	—
October 22, 2016	Caracas	Venezuela	Centro Comercial Tamanaco	—	—
North America
October 27, 2016	León	Mexico	Poliforum León	—	—
October 28, 2016	San Luis Potosí	Mexico	El Domo	—	—
October 29, 2016	Mérida	Mexico	Coliseo Yucatán	—	—
October 30, 2016	Puebla	Mexico	Acrópolis	—	—
November 2, 2016	Culiacán	Mexico	Foro Tecate	—	—
November 3, 2016	Mexico City	Mexico	Auditorio Nacional	8,892 / 9,103	$293,591
November 4, 2016	Torreón	Mexico	Estadio Revolución	—	—
November 5, 2016	Tijuana	Mexico	Estadio Gasmart	—	—
November 6, 2016	Hermosillo	Mexico	Expo Forum	—	—
November 10, 2016	Monterrey	Mexico	Arena Monterrey	—	—
November 11, 2016	Mexico City	Mexico	Auditorio Nacional	9,618 / 9,810	$345,289
November 12, 2016	Tuxtla Gutiérrez	Mexico	Nuevo Foro Chiapas	—	—
November 13, 2016	Chihuahua	Mexico	Estadio Manuel L. Almanza	—	—
November 19, 2016	San Juan	Puerto Rico	José Miguel Agrelot Coliseum	—	—
South America
November 26, 2016	Neiva	Colombia	Los Lagos Club	—	—
December 3, 2016	Posadas	Argentina	Estadio Crucero del Norte	—	—
December 4, 2016	Corrientes	Argentina	Anfiteatro Cocomarola	—	—
December 5, 2016	Santa Fe	Argentina	Estadio Club Unión	—	—
December 6, 2016	Mendoza	Argentina	Sancor Seguros Arena	—	—
December 7, 2016	Mendoza	Argentina	Sancor Seguros Arena	—	—
December 8, 2016	Córdoba	Argentina	Orfeo Superdomo	—	—
December 9, 2016	Rosario	Argentina	Metropolitano	—	—
December 10, 2016	Asunción	Paraguay	Rakiura	—	—
December 11, 2016	Buenos Aires	Argentina	DirecTV Arena	—	—
December 12, 2016	Montevideo	Uruguay	Velódromo de Montevideo	—	—
December 13, 2016	Montevideo	Uruguay	Velódromo de Montevideo	—	—
December 27, 2016 (Note: The December 27, 2016 show at Estadio Pascual Guerrero in Cali was part of the 2016 Cali Fair.)	Cali	Colombia	Estadio Pascual Guerrero	—	—
January 6, 2017	Cartagena	Colombia	Estadio Jaime Morón	—	—
February 3, 2017 (Note: The February 3, 2017 show at Anfiteatro de Villa María in Villa María is part of the 2017 Festival de Villa María.)	Villa María	Argentina	Anfiteatro de Villa María	—	—
February 5, 2017 (Note: The February 5, 2017 show at Predio Ferial in General Roca is part of the 2017 Fiesta Nacional de La Manzana.)	General Roca	Argentina	Predio Ferial	—	—
February 15, 2017	Baradero	Argentina	Anfiteatro Pedro Carossi	—	—
February 17, 2017 (Note: The February 17, 2017 show at Anfiteatro del Bosque in El Calafate is part of the 2017 Fiesta Nacional del Lago.)	El Calafate	Argentina	Anfiteatro del Bosque	—	—
February 24, 2017 (Note: The concert of February 24, 2017 in Viña del Mar at Quinta Vergara Amphitheater is part of the LVIII Viña del Mar International Song Festival.)	Viña del Mar	Chile	Quinta Vergara Amphitheater	—	—
North America
March 2, 2017	Hidalgo	United States	State Farm Arena	37,554 / 41,422	$2,763,099
March 3, 2017	Houston	United States	Revention Music Center	37,554 / 41,422	$2,763,099
March 4, 2017	El Paso	United States	El Paso County Coliseum	37,554 / 41,422	$2,763,099
March 6, 2017	Dallas	United States	Music Hall at Fair Park	37,554 / 41,422	$2,763,099
March 9, 2017	Orlando	United States	House of Blues Orlando	37,554 / 41,422	$2,763,099
March 10, 2017	Miami	United States	The Fillmore Miami Beach	37,554 / 41,422	$2,763,099
March 11, 2017	Miami	United States	The Fillmore Miami Beach	37,554 / 41,422	$2,763,099
March 12, 2017	Atlanta	United States	Fox Theatre	37,554 / 41,422	$2,763,099
March 16, 2017	Rosemont	United States	Rosemont Theatre	37,554 / 41,422	$2,763,099
March 17, 2017	New York City	United States	Hammerstein Ballroom	37,554 / 41,422	$2,763,099
March 18, 2017	Fairfax	United States	EagleBank Arena	37,554 / 41,422	$2,763,099
March 19, 2017	Boston	United States	House of Blues Boston	37,554 / 41,422	$2,763,099
March 23, 2017	Phoenix	United States	Comerica Theatre	3,597 / 4,364	$239,760
March 24, 2017	Las Vegas	United States	The Chelsea	3,019 / 3,348	$180,025
March 25, 2017	San Jose	United States	City National Civic	2,787 / 2,787	$224,263
March 26, 2017	Los Angeles	United States	Microsoft Theater	6,866 / 6,866	$427,658
Latin America
April 12, 2017	Puerto San José	Guatemala	Autopista Puerto Quetzal	—	—
April 13, 2017	Puerto Vallarta	Mexico	Hard Rock Hotel	—	—
April 15, 2017	Cancún	Mexico	Oasis Arena	—	—
May 11, 2017	Morelia	Mexico	Plaza Monumental de Morelia	—	—
May 12, 2017	Cuernavaca	Mexico	Jardines de Mexico	—	—
May 13, 2017	Tijuana	Mexico	Estadio Gasmart	—	—
May 14, 2017	Mexicali	Mexico	Explanada FEX	—	—
May 17, 2017	Guadalajara	Mexico	Auditorio Telmex	8,662 / 8,668	$543,944
May 18, 2017	Monterrey	Mexico	Arena Monterrey	—	—
May 19, 2017	Tampico	Mexico	Expo Tampico	—	—
May 20, 2017	Mexico City	Mexico	Mexico City Arena	15,470 / 18,015	$583,386
May 21, 2017	Querétaro City	Mexico	Estadio Municipal	—	—
June 17, 2017	La Romana	Dominican Republic	Altos de Chavón	—	—
June 23, 2017	Portoviejo	Ecuador	Centro de Eventos La Esperanza	—	—
June 24, 2017 (Note: The concert of June 24, 2017 in Machala at Colegio 9 de Octubre was part of the Fiestas Patronales de Machala.)	Machala	Ecuador	Colegio 9 de Octubre	—	—
July 1, 2017 (Note: The concert of July 1, 2017 in Oranjestad at Harbor Square Arena is part of the 2017 Aruba Summer Music Festival.)	Oranjestad	Aruba	Harbor Square Arena	—	—
July 2, 2017 (Note: The concert of July 2, 2017 in Goiânia at Estacionamento do Serra Dourada is part of the Villa Mix Festival.)	Goiânia	Brazil	Estacionamento do Serra Dourada	—	—
July 13, 2017 (Note: The concert of July 13, 2017 in Durango at Estadio Francisco Zarco is part of the Feria Nacional de Durango.)	Durango	Mexico	Estadio Francisco Zarco	—	—
August 30, 2017	Santiago	Chile	Movistar Arena	19,484 / 22,808	$1,151,610
August 31, 2017	Santiago	Chile	Movistar Arena	19,484 / 22,808	$1,151,610
September 1, 2017	Santiago	Chile	Movistar Arena	11,376 / 11,404	$729,476
September 2, 2017	San Luis	Argentina	La Pedrera	—	—
September 3, 2017	San Juan	Argentina	Estadio Parque de Mayo	—	—
Europe
September 8, 2017	Tenerife	Spain	Recinto Portuario	8,000	—
September 9, 2017	Las Palmas	Spain	Estadio Gran Canaria	8,000	—
September 13, 2017	Bilbao	Spain	Bilbao Exhibition Centre	7,000	—
September 15, 2017	Santiago de Compostela	Spain	Pavillón Multiusos Fontes do Sar	—	—
September 17, 2017	Barcelona	Spain	Palau Sant Jordi	12,000	—
September 20, 2017	Madrid	Spain	WiZink Center	14,000	—
September 22, 2017	Murcia	Spain	Plaza de Toros de Murcia	10,000	—
September 22, 2017	Málaga	Spain	Auditorio Municipal de Málaga	9,000	—
September 24, 2017	Seville	Spain	Auditorio Rocío Jurado	8,000	—
September 26, 2017	London	England	Shepherd's Bush Empire	3,000	—
September 28, 2017	Amsterdam	Netherlands	AFAS Live	6,000	—
September 30, 2017	Paris	France	Zénith Paris	7,000	—
October 2, 2017	Düsseldorf	Germany	ISS Dome	7,000	—
October 3, 2017	Ulm	Germany	Ratiopharm Arena	8,000	—
October 6, 2017	Milan	Italy	PalaYamamay	9,000	—
October 7, 2017	Naples	Italy	Palapartenope	8,000	—
Asia					—
October 12, 2017	Tel Aviv	Israel	Reggaeton Live Park	15,000	—
Latin America
October 19, 2017	Panama City	Panama	Figali Convention Center	—	—
October 27, 2017	Quito	Ecuador	Coliseo General Rumiñahui	—	—
October 28, 2017	Guayaquil	Ecuador	Simón Bolivar Convention Center	—	—
November 3, 2017 (Note: The concert of November 3, 2017 in Santo Domingo is part of the Festival Presidente.)	Santo Domingo	Dominican Republic	Estadio Olímpico Félix Sánchez	—	—
November 9, 2017	São Paulo	Brazil	Espaço das Américas	—	—
November 10, 2017	Rio de Janeiro	Brazil	Vivo Rio	—	—
November 11, 2017	Brasília	Brazil	NET Live	—	—
November 25, 2017	Córdoba	Argentina	Orfeo Superdomo	—	—
November 26, 2017	Rosario	Argentina	Jockey Club de Rosario	—	—
November 28, 2017	Tucumán	Argentina	Estadio Central Córdoba	—	—
November 29, 2017	Salta	Argentina	Estadio Delmi	—	—
December 1, 2017	Buenos Aires	Argentina	Hipódromo de Palermo	—	—
December 2, 2017	Santa Fe	Argentina	Estadio Gimasia y Esgrima	—	—
December 3, 2017	Buenos Aires	Argentina	Hipódromo de Palermo	—	—
December 4, 2017	Montevideo	Uruguay	Velódromo de Montevideo	—	—
December 8, 2017	León	Mexico	Megavelaria	—	—
December 13, 2017	Monterrey	Mexico	Arena Monterrey	—	—
December 15, 2017	Mexico City	Mexico	Mexico City Arena	—	—
Total				—	—

== Cancelled shows ==
List of cancelled concerts, showing date, city, country, venue and reason for cancellation
Date	City	Country	Venue	Reason/Additional Info
July 8, 2016	Loja	Ecuador	Estadio Federativo Reina del Cisne	Breach of contract
December 3, 2016 (Note: The December 3, 2016 show at Indoor Stadium in Buenos Aires would have been part of the 2016 Shout Festival.)	Buenos Aires	Argentina	Tecnópolis Arena	Festival cancelled
October 8, 2017	Rome	Italy	Atlantico Live	Security risks
December 9, 2017	Boca del Río	Mexico	Estadio Pirata Fuente	"Unforeseen circumstances"
