= El Perdedor =

El Perdedor may refer to:

- "El Perdedor" (Aventura song), 2006
- "El Perdedor" (Enrique Iglesias song), 2013
- "El Perdedor" (Maluma song), 2016
