= 2016 Premios Juventud =

13th Premios Juventud
- Date: July 14, 2016
- Location: Watsco Center in Coral Gables, Florida
- Hosted by: William Levy and Emeraude Toubia
- Website: Official Page

Television/radio coverage
- Network: Univision

The 13th Annual Premios Juventud (Youth Awards) were broadcast by Univision on July 14, 2016.

== Performers ==
Artist (s)	Song (s)
Anahí	"Amnesia"
Reik	"La Banda"
Jesse y Joy	"Dueles"
J Balvin	"Bobo"
Chino y Nacho Ft. Daddy Yankee	"Andas En Mí Cabeza"
Chiquis Rivera Ft. Gloria Trevi	"Pelo Suelto"
Laura Pausini Ft. Mario Domm	"Víveme"
Laura Pausini Ft. Mario Domm	"Mientes"
Maite Perroni	"Adicta"
Maluma	"El Perdedor"
CNCO	"Quisiera"
Enrique Iglesias Ft. Wisin	"Duele El Corazón"
Becky G	"Sola"
Sofía Reyes Ft. Prince Royce	"Sólo Yo"
Prince Royce	"Stand by Me"
Prince Royce	"La Carretera"
Luis Coronel Ft. Farruko	"No Voy A Dejar"
Pitbull Ft. Yandel	"Ay Mí Dios"
Pitbull Ft. Yandel	"Messin" Around"
Pitbull Ft. Yandel	"The Anthem"
Marc Anthony Ft. Luis Figueroa	"Flor Pálida"
Zion Ft. Lennox	"Embriágame"

== Winners and nominees ==
=== Music ===
La Combinación Perfecta	Lo Toco Todo
"La Gozadera" – Gente de Zona ft. Marc Anthony; "Back it Up" – Prince Royce ft. Jennifer López & Pitbull; "Cómo Duele el Silencio" – Leslie Grace ft. Luis Coronel; "Desde Esa Noche" – Thalía ft. Maluma; "Rumba" – Anahí ft. Wisin; "Sunset" – Farruko ft. Shaggy & Nicky Jam	Los Vaqueros: La Trilogía – Wisin; Los Favoritos – Arcángel & DJ Luian; Pretty Boy, Dirty Boy – Maluma; Radio Universo – Chino y Nacho; Visionary – Farruko
Voz del Momento	Mi Artista Pop Rock
Nicky Jam; Abraham Mateo; Anahí; CNCO; Luis Coronel; Maluma	CNCO; Abraham Mateo; Alejandra Guzmán; Anahí; Becky G; Maná
La Más Pegajosa	Canción Corta–Venas
"Tan Fácil" – CNCO; "Borró Cassette" – Maluma; "Ginza" – J Balvin; "Nada Más Por Eso" – Luis Coronel; "Rumba" – Anahí ft. Wisin	"Perdón Perdón" – Ha*Ash; "Así Es Tu Amor" – Abraham Mateo; "Dejarte de Amar" – Dulce María; "Eres" – Anahí ft. Julión Álvarez; "Nada Más Por Eso" – Luis Coronel
Mi Artista Regional Mexicano	Mi Artista Tropical
Luis Coronel; Calibre 50; Chiquis Rivera; Gerardo Ortiz; Julión Álvarez; Larry Hernández	Marc Anthony; Carlos Vives; Chino y Nacho; Gente de Zona; Juan Luis Guerra; Prince Royce; Romeo Santos
Mi Artista Urbano	El Súper Tour
Nicky Jam; Daddy Yankee; Farruko; J Balvin; Maluma; Wisin	"One World Tour" – Ricky Martin; "Dos Mundos, Una Historia 4" – Gerardo Ortíz ft. Calibre 50; "El Amor World Tour" – Gloria Trevi; "Fenix Tour" – Nicky Jam; "La Familia Tour" – J Balvin; "Pretty Boy, Dirty Boy World Tour" – Maluma
Favorite Hitmaker	Favorite Hit
Adele; Ariana Grande; Bruno Mars; Justin Bieber; Maroon 5	"Hello" – Adele; "I Know What You Did Last Summer" – Shawn Mendes ft. Camila Cabello; "Love Yourself" – Justin Bieber; "See You Again" – Wiz Khalifa ft. Charlie Puth; "Sorry" – Justin Bieber; "Work from Home" – Fifth Harmony ft. Ty Dolla Sign
Producers Choice Award
CNCO; Alkilados; Cali y El Dandee; Dvicio; Karol G; Manuel Medrano; MC Davo; Pipe Bueno; Sebastián Yatra; Sofía Carson; Victoria “La Mala” Ortiz

=== Novelas ===
Mi Protagonista Favorito	Mi Protagonista Favorita
Fernando Colunga - (Pasión y Poder); Arath de la Torre - (Antes muerta que Lichita); David Zepeda - (Hasta El Fin Del Mundo); José Ron - (Muchacha Italiana Viene a Casarse); Sergio Goyri - (Que Te Perdone Dios)	Maite Perroni - (Antes muerta que Lichita); Ana Brenda Contreras - (Lo Imperdonable); Livia Brito - (Muchacha Italiana Viene a Casarse); Marjorie de Sousa - (Hasta El Fin Del Mundo); Zuria Vega - (Que Te Perdone Dios)
Mejor Tema Novelero
"Tu Respiración" – Chayanne - (Lo Imperdonable); "A Dónde Va Nuestro Amor" – Playa Limbo - (Muchacha Italiana Viene a Casarse); "Aunque Ahora Estés Con El" – Calibre 50 - (Que Te Perdone Dios); "Mi Verdad" – Maná ft. Shakira - (Sueño de Amor); "Si Alguna Vez" – Thalía - (Antes muerta que Lichita)

=== Films ===
¡Qué Actorazo!	Actriz Que Se Roba La Pantalla
Jorge Pabon; Antonio Banderas; Arath de la Torre; Fernando Colunga; Frank Perozo	Jennifer López; Eva Mendes; Kate del Castillo; Maite Perroni; Sofía Vergara
Película Más Padre
Furious 7; Busco novio para mi mujer; Hotel Transylvania 2; Ride Along 2; The Revenant

=== Social networks ===
Mi Tuitero Favorito	6 Segundos de Fama
CNCO; Alejandro Sanz; Becky G; Enrique Iglesias; Fifth Harmony; J Balvin; Jennifer López; Maluma; Prince Royce; Shakira	David López; Juanpa Zurita; Lauren Giraldo; Lele Pons; Rudy Mancuso
De Cover a Cover	Mi “Fan Army” Favorito
Luis Figueroa; Chucho Rivas; Daniela Andrade; Griss Romero; Leroy Sánchez; Lucah	LaFamilia – J Balvin; CNCOwners – CNCO; LasCoronelas – Luis Coronel; Malumaniaticas – Maluma; Perronitos – Maite Perroni

=== Sports ===
Deportista de Alto Voltaje	La Nueva Promesa
Carlos Correa; James Rodríguez; Javier “El Chicharito” Hernández; Javier Prieto; Lionel Messi	Adriana Díaz; Adalberto Peñaranda; Adrián Gandía; Alex “El Cholo” Saucedo; Carlos Salcedo

== Multiple nominations and awards ==
Artists that received multiple nominations
Nominations	Artist(s)
8	Maluma
6	CNCO
5	Anahí
5	J Balvin
5	Luis Coronel
4	Wisin
3	Calibre 50
3	Maite Perroni
3	Justin Bieber
3	Prince Royce
2	Adele
2	Arath de la Torre
2	Fernando Colunga
2	Fifth Harmony
2	Gente de Zona
2	Thalía
2	Shakira
2	Becky G
