= List of number-one songs of 2015 (Colombia) =

This is a list of the National-Report Top 100 Nacional number-one songs of 2015. Chart rankings are based on radio play and are issued weekly. The data is compiled monitoring radio stations through an automated system in real-time.

== Number ones by week ==
Key
†	Song of the year

Week	Issue date	Song	Artist(s)	Ref.
1	December 29	"Bailando"	Enrique Iglesias featuring Gente de Zona & Descemer Bueno	
2	January 5	"Ella Es Mi Fiesta"	Carlos Vives	
3	January 12	"Adiós"	Ricky Martin	
4	January 19	"Adiós"	Ricky Martin	
5	January 26	"Adiós"	Ricky Martin	
6	February 2	"Juntos (Together)"	Juanes	
7	February 9	"Juntos (Together)"	Juanes	
8	February 16	"Juntos (Together)"	Juanes	
9	February 23	"Juntos (Together)"	Juanes	
10	March 2	"Juntos (Together)"	Juanes	
11	March 9	"Juntos (Together)"	Juanes	
12	March 16	"Juntos (Together)"	Juanes	
13	March 23	"Juntos (Together)"	Juanes	
14	March 30	"Cuando Te Veo"†	ChocQuibTown	
15	April 6	"Cuando Te Veo"†	ChocQuibTown	
16	April 13	"Cuando Te Veo"†	ChocQuibTown	
17	April 20	"Cuando Te Veo"†	ChocQuibTown	
18	April 27	"Cuando Te Veo"†	ChocQuibTown	
19	May 4	"Cuando Te Veo"†	ChocQuibTown	
20	May 11	"Cuando Te Veo"†	ChocQuibTown	
21	May 18	"Cuando Te Veo"†	ChocQuibTown	
22	May 25	"Cuando Te Veo"†	ChocQuibTown	
23	June 1	"Cuando Te Veo"†	ChocQuibTown	
24	June 8	"Cuando Te Veo"†	ChocQuibTown	
25	June 15	"Cuando Te Veo"†	ChocQuibTown	
26	June 22	"Cuando Te Veo"†	ChocQuibTown	
27	June 26	"Cuando Te Veo"†	ChocQuibTown	
28	July 3	"Cuando Te Veo"†	ChocQuibTown	
29	July 10	"Cuando Te Veo"†	ChocQuibTown	
30	July 17	"Cuando Te Veo"†	ChocQuibTown	
31	July 24	"Cuando Te Veo"†	ChocQuibTown	
32	July 31	"Borró Cassette"	Maluma	
33	August 7	"Borró Cassette"	Maluma	
34	August 14	"Borró Cassette"	Maluma	
35	August 21	"Borró Cassette"	Maluma	
36	August 28	"Borró Cassette"	Maluma	
37	September 4	"Las Cosas de la vida"	Carlos Vives	
38	September 11	"Borró Cassette"	Maluma	
39	September 18	"Borró Cassette"	Maluma	
40	September 26	"Borró Cassette"	Maluma	
41	October 3	"Borró Cassette"	Maluma	
42	October 10	"Borró Cassette"	Maluma	
43	October 17	"Borró Cassette"	Maluma	
44	October 24	"Borró Cassette"	Maluma	
45	October 31	"Borró Cassette"	Maluma	
46	November 7	"Borró Cassette"	Maluma	
47	November 14	"Borró Cassette"	Maluma	
48	November 21	"Magdalena"	Alkilados featuring Mike Bahia	
49	November 28	"Magdalena"	Alkilados featuring Mike Bahia	
50	December 5	"Ginza"	J Balvin	
51	December 12	"Magdalena"	Alkilados feautirng Mike Bahia	
52	December 19	"Desde el dia en que te fuiste"	ChocQuibTown	
