= Sim ou Não =

2016 song by Anitta featuring Maluma

Single by Anitta featuring Maluma
- Language: Portuguese; Spanish
- English title: "Yes or No"
- Released: July 28, 2016
- Recorded: 2016
- Studio: U.M. Music, Rio de Janeiro, Brazil
- Genre: Dance-pop; reggaetón
- Length: 3:26
- Label: Warner Music
- Songwriters: Larissa Machado; Juan Arias; Umberto Tavares; Jefferson Junior
- Producers: Mãozinha; Umberto Tavares

Anitta singles chronology
"Faz Parte" (2016)	"Sim ou Não" (2016)	"Totalmente Demais" (2016)

Maluma singles chronology
"El Perdedor" (2016)	"Sim ou Não" (2016)	"Sin Contrato" (2016)

Music video
- "Sim ou Não" on YouTube

"Sí O No"

Single by Anitta featuring Maluma
- Language: Spanish
- Released: December 8, 2016

Anitta singles chronology
"RG" (2016)	"Sí O No" (2016)	"Loka" (2017)

Maluma singles chronology
"Cuatro Babys" (2016)	"Sí O No" (2016)	"Chantaje" (2016)

"Sim ou Não" (English: Yes or No) is a song by Brazilian singer Anitta featuring Colombian singer Maluma, released on July 28, 2016, by Warner Music. It was composed by Anitta, Umberto Tavares and Jefferson Junior, with additional lyrics in Spanish written by Maluma. A Spanish version of the song, entitled "Sí o No" ("Yes or No"), was also recorded by the singer.

"Sim ou Não" is a pop song, with lyrics that talks about the desire between two people in different environments. The music video for the song was recorded on July 4, 2016, in Mexico City, and was directed by Jessy Terrero.

== Music videos ==
The music video of the song was recorded on July 4, 2016, in a nightclub in Mexico City, and was directed by the Dominican director Jessy Terrero, who has worked with other Latin artists such as Enrique Iglesias, Anahí, Ricky Martin and Jennifer Lopez.

Anitta recorded the music video for the Spanish version in Los Angeles, California, in November 2016. She had extensions to her hair as she had shoulder-length hair at the time of the shooting. It premiered on December 9, 2016, on her YouTube account.

== Live performances ==
Anitta first performed the song on Rede Globo's TV show Caldeirão do Huck, on August 6, 2016. On August 17, 2016, she performed the song on Rede Globo's Encontro com Fátima Bernardes TV show. She later performed it on August 23, on her own TV show, Música Boa Ao Vivo, on Multishow, and later performed the song on Rede Record's TV shows Programa da Sabrina, on August 27, and on Hora do Faro, the following day. On November 9, she performed the song on the stage of X Factor Brasil. All performances did not feature Maluma.

== Reception ==
=== Commercial performance ===
The song peaked at number 15 on the (Billboard Brasil Hot 100 Airplay).

== Track listings ==
- CD single
1. "Sim Ou Não" (ft. Maluma) – 3:26
- Digital download
1. "Sim Ou Não" (ft. Maluma) – 3:26
2. "Sí O No" (ft. Maluma) – 3:27

== Charts ==
Chart (2016–2017)	Peak position
Brazil (Brasil Hot 100)	15
Brazil (Billboard Pop Airplay)	7
Chile (Monitor Latino)	15
Mexico (Billboard Mexican Airplay)	42
Mexico (Billboard Espanol Airplay)	13

=== Year-end charts ===
Chart (2017)	Position
Brazil (Pro-Música Brasil)	54

== Certifications ==
Certifications for Sim ou Não
Region	Certification	Certified units/sales
Portugal (AFP)	Gold	5,000^{‡}
^{‡} Sales+streaming figures based on certification alone.
