= Qué Chimba =

Song by Maluma
- Released: 13 March 2020
- Recorded: 2020
- Genre: Reggaeton; Latin pop

Qué Chimba is a song by Colombian singer Maluma, released on March 13, 2020.

== Description ==
Maluma First Teases the title of the song on his Instagram account with posting a post with the word "Que Chimba", and asking his followers if they know what does it mean.“Que Chimba” is an electronic Colombian guaracha, produced by Victor Cárdenas, which inspires dance and, in fact, rises on Colombia's dance tracks. A few months ago, the song leaked through the DJs at the discos in the artist's country, and immediately became a success among young people, which made Maluma decide to take the song out by responding to popular demand.

The video directed and produced by Maluma with his creative director and photographer Tes (Cesar Pimienta), was recorded with the camera of a mobile phone in February and the first days of March in Europe in the cities of Prague and Munich, amidst his tour of the region.

Back home, Maluma and his foundation The Art of Dreams collaborated with the people of Antioquia, Colombia, with delivery of expenses to overcome the COVID-19 crisis. The foundation has also donated medical equipment, stoppers, gloves and disposable uniforms to various hospitals in the region.

At the head of President Manuela Londoño Arias and founder Juan Luis Londoño Arias (Maluma) concerned about the situation of the families of the 170 dreamers who are part of the organization and who belong to the vulnerable population of Antioquia, they continue to support their development, this time welcoming the whole family. Dream Art has delivered markets that will allow them to carry this moment of isolation without passing through such needs. Additional markets are being donated to families in the Alto de la Virgin in Guarne and in the municipality of Venice, Antioquia.

During the COVID-19 pandemic quarantine, Maluma revealed a new TikTok dance of the song, with his friend

== Certifications ==
Region	Certification	Certified units/sales
Mexico (AMPROFON)	Gold	30,000^{‡}
^{‡} Sales+streaming figures based on certification alone.
