= Sin Contrato =

2016 single by Maluma

Single by Maluma

from the album Pretty Boy, Dirty Boy
- Language: Spanish
- English title: "No Contract"
- Released: 26 August 2016
- Length: 3:41
- Label: Sony Latin
- Songwriters: Juan Luis Londoño; Andrés Castro
- Producer: Andrés Castro

Maluma singles chronology
"Sim ou Não" (2016)	"Sin Contrato" (2016)	"Vente Pa' Ca" (2016)

Music video
- "Sin Contrato" on YouTube

"Sin Contrato" (English: "No Contract") is a song by the Colombian singer Maluma taken from his second album Pretty Boy, Dirty Boy (2015). Maluma co-wrote the song with producer Andrés Castro. It was released as the album's fourth single on 26 August 2016 through Sony Music Latin. The song peaked at number three in Colombia and at number seven on the US Hot Latin Songs chart.

The song featuring guest vocals from the American girl group Fifth Harmony released in November 2015 in North America and Europe during their duet performance at 16th Annual Latin Grammy Awards and other versions featuring the Puerto Rican singers Don Omar and Wisin released on the same month.

== Music video ==
The music video for "Sin Contracto" premiered on 26 August 2016 on Maluma's Vevo account on YouTube. The music video was directed by Jessy Terrero and was filmed across various locations in the Dominican Republic. It features Yaritza Reyes who represented the Dominican Republic at Miss Universe 2013 in Russia and Miss World 2016 in the United States. The music video has over 990 million views on YouTube.

== Track listing ==
Digital download
No.	Title	Length
1.	"Sin Contrato"	3:41

Remix – North America and Europe
No.	Title	Length
1.	"Sin Contrato" (featuring Fifth Harmony)	3:01

Remix – Latin America
No.	Title	Length
1.	"Sin Contrato" (featuring Don Omar and Wisin)	3:51

== Charts ==
Chart (2016)	Peak position
Chile (Monitor Latino)	8
Colombia (National-Report)	3
Mexico (Billboard Mexican Airplay) Maluma featuring Fifth Harmony or Don Omar and Wisin	6
Mexico (Monitor Latino)	5
Spain (Promusicae) Maluma featuring Fifth Harmony	52
US Hot Latin Songs (Billboard) Maluma featuring Fifth Harmony or Don Omar and Wisin	7
US Latin Airplay (Billboard)	1
US Latin Rhythm Airplay (Billboard)	1
US Tropical Airplay (Billboard) Maluma featuring Fifth Harmony or Don Omar and Wisin	8

=== Year-end charts ===
Chart (2016)	Position
US Hot Latin Songs (Billboard); Maluma featuring Fifth Harmony or Don Omar and Wisin	76

== Certifications ==
Region	Certification	Certified units/sales
Brazil (Pro-Música Brasil)	2× Platinum	120,000^{‡}
Italy (FIMI)	Gold	25,000^{‡}
Mexico (AMPROFON)	Diamond+Platinum+Gold	390,000^{‡}
Spain (Promusicae)	Platinum	40,000^{‡}
^{‡} Sales+streaming figures based on certification alone.

== See also ==
- List of Billboard number-one Latin songs of 2017
