= Pretty Boy, Dirty Boy =

2015 studio album by Maluma

Studio album by Maluma
- Released: 30 October 2015
- Recorded: 2014–15
- Genres: Latin pop; reggaeton
- Length: 56:02
- Label: Sony Latin

Maluma chronology
PB.DB The Mixtape (2015)	Pretty Boy, Dirty Boy (2015)	F.A.M.E. (2018)

Singles from Pretty Boy, Dirty Boy
- 1. "El Tiki" Released: 31 March 2015; 2. "Borró Cassette" Released: 29 June 2015; 3. "El Perdedor" Released: 22 April 2016; 4. "Sin Contrato" Released: 26 August 2016

Pretty Boy, Dirty Boy is the second studio album by Colombian rapper and singer Maluma, released on 30 October 2015, by Sony Music Latin. Work on the album lasted three years, during which Maluma collaborated with various songwriters and producers. Pretty Boy, Dirty Boy is a concept album meant to showcase the different facets of Maluma; the Pretty Boy side contains romantic balladry and the Dirty Boy consisting of reggaeton-infused seductive songs. Four singles were released from the album, "El Tiki" and "Borró Cassette" which preceded its release and "El Perdedor" and "Sin Contrato" – all of them were successful in countries across Latin America. In order to promote the album, Maluma embarked the Pretty Boy, Dirty Boy World Tour in 2016.

== Background and release ==
Work on Pretty Boy, Dirty Boy began in 2014. In the period since then and the album's release, Maluma recorded approximately 80 songs none of which made it on the final track listing. He acknowledged that he "took time" in order to choose the best material for the album, live up the public expectations, make it sound "modern" and in the essence of his musical style; due to that the release date of the album was postponed. The concept behind Pretty Boy, Dirty Boy was to showcase the singer's dual personality; the "pretty-boy persona" represented by romantic ballads and the "dirty-boy" by reggaeton songs with "seductive" lyrics. During an interview, Maluma explained, "All human beings have a duality. I have a romantic side and a more malicious one. I wanted to show both versions".

The album contains features by various Latin singers – Farruko, Alexis & Fido, Leslie Grace, Cosculluela, El Micha and Arcángel all make feature appearances throughout the album. Musically, the album contains elements of reggaeton, pop and urban music. Nick Murray, writing for Rolling Stone summarized the sound as "simple, warm arrangements filled with fleeting melodies and rich basslines". The album was made available for digital download on 30 October 2015. The same day, all of its songs were made available for streaming on Maluma's Vevo channel. "El Tiki" was released as the album's first single on 31 March 2015.

== Critical reception ==
In a review for the website Remezcla, Sara Skolnick wrote that Pretty Boy, Dirty Boy "stays safely in pop territory, delivering polished, reggaeton-rooted sounds with some straying surprises". However, she noted that the singer's duality, although evident in the lyrics of the song, was not seen in "the music's aesthetic range", adding that the Dirty Boy side of the album remained unexplored. The album was nominated in the category for favorite album at the 2016 Premios Juventud and won a Lo Nuestro Award for Urban Album of the Year.

== Commercial performance ==
Pretty Boy, Dirty Boy debuted on top of the US Billboard Top Latin Albums, selling 3,000 copies in its first week and becoming Maluma's first number-one album on that chart. It has since spent additional 17 weeks on that chart before falling out.

== Promotion ==
In order to promote the album, Maluma launched the Pretty Boy, Dirty Boy World Tour in 2016, visiting mostly countries of Latin America and the US. In May 2016, concert dates for Spain were scheduled in October, marking the first time the singer would perform in the country.

== Track listing ==
Standard edition
No.	Title	Writer(s)	Length
1.	"Borró Cassette"	Bryan Snaider Lezcano Chaverra; Kevin Mauricio Jiménez; Juan Luis Londoño; JY (El De La J); Rene David Cano Rios	03:28
2.	"¿Dónde Estás?" (featuring Farruko)	Londoño; Carlos E. Reyes Rosado; Sharo Torres	03:18
3.	"El Perdedor"	JY (El De La J); Chaverra; Jiménez; Londoño; Miky la Sensa	03:28
4.	"Me Gustas"	Jonathan De Jesús Gandarilla; Londoño	03:38
5.	"Sin Contrato"	Edgar Barrera; Andrés Castro; Londoño	03:42
6.	"Una Aventura" (featuring Alexis & Fido)	Londoño; Joel Martinez	03:51
7.	"Tengo un Amor" (featuring Leslie Grace)	Edgar Barrera; Andrés Castro; Londoño	03:48
8.	"Pretextos" (featuring Cosculluela)	Chaverra; Jonathan De La Cruz; Jiménez; Londoño; José Fernando Cosculluela Suárez	03:49
9.	"Ya No Es Niña"	Johnatan Ballesteros; Londoño; Juan Diego Medina; Christian Mena; Luis Felipe Morales	03:36
10.	"Solos" (featuring El Micha)	Chaverra; Jiménez; Londoño; Michael Sierra	03:28
11.	"Tu Cariño" (featuring Arcángel)	Chaverra; Jiménez; Londoño; Austín Santos	03:08
12.	"Recuérdame"	Londoño; Justin Quiles; Jonathan Rivera; Sixto Rodriguez; Giancarlos Rivera Tapia	03:11
13.	"La Misma Moneda"	Marlo Eduardo Betancourt Arbelaez; Chaverra; Jiménez; Londoño	03:42
14.	"Vuelo Hacia el Olvido"	Bruno Linares; Londoño	03:34
15.	"El Tiki"	Arbelaez; Chaverra; Jiménez; Londoño	03:02
16.	"Carnaval"	Londoño; Rivera; Gabriel Rodríguez; Giancarlos Rivera Tapia	03:35
Total length:			56:02

== Credits and personnel ==
Credits adapted from the website AllMusic.

- Diego Abaroa – label manager
- JY (El De La J) – record producer, producer, composer
- Kevin Adg – record producer, producer
- Alexis – featured artist
- Marlon Eduardo Betancur Arbelaez – composer
- Arcángel – featured artist
- Johnatan Ballesteros – composer
- Edgar Barrera – composer, producer
- Marlo Eduardo Betancourt – composer
- Andrés Castro – composer, producer
- Bryan Snaider Lezcano Chaverra – composer, producer
- Cosculluela – featured artist
- Jonathan De Jesús Gandarilla – composer
- Jonathan De La Cruz – composer
- Farruko – featured artist
- Fido – featured artist, producer
- Jorge Fonseca – A&R
- Mike Fuller – mastering, mastering engineer
- Julián Gaviria – photography
- Chan El Genío – engineer, producer
- Leslie Grace – featured artist
- Obed Guzmán – mixing
- Kevin Mauricio Jiménez – composer, producer
- Bruno Linares – composer, producer
- Maluma – composer, liner notes
- Madmusick – producer
- Joel Martinez – composer
- Master Chris – mixing
- Edgardo Matta – mixing
- Guillermo Mazorra – A&R
- Juan Diego Medina – composer
- Christian Mena – composer
- El Micha – featured artist
- Luis Felipe Morales – composer
- Nicolás Muñoz – art direction, concept, graphic design
- Justine Quiles – composer
- Rene David Cano Rios – composer
- Jonathan Rivera – composer, producer
- Gabriel Rodríguez – composer, engineer
- Sixto Rodriguez – composer
- Carlos E. Reyes Rosado – composer
- Santana the Golden Boy – producer
- Austín Santos – composer
- Miky la Sensa – composer
- Michael Sierra – composer
- Andres Suarez – assistant photographer
- Giancarlos Rivera Tapia – composer, producer
- Sharo Torres – composer, producer
- Roberto "Tito" Vazquez – mixing engineer
- Saga WhiteBlack – producer

== Charts ==
=== Weekly charts ===
Chart (2015–2016)	Peak position
Argentine Albums (CAPIF)	8
Mexican Albums (AMPROFON)	2
Spanish Albums (Promusicae)	2
Uruguayan Albums (CUD)	9
US Top Latin Albums (Billboard)	1
US Latin Rhythm Albums (Billboard)	1
Venezuelan Albums (Recordland)	4

=== Year-end charts ===
Chart (2016)	Position
Mexican Albums (AMPROFON)	35
Spanish Albums (PROMUSICAE)	87
US Top Latin Albums (Billboard)	27
Chart (2017)	Position
Spanish Albums (PROMUSICAE)	97
US Top Latin Albums (Billboard)	9
Chart (2018)	Position
US Top Latin Albums (Billboard)	20
Chart (2019)	Position
US Top Latin Albums (Billboard)	57

== Certifications ==
Region	Certification	Certified units/sales
Brazil (Pro-Música Brasil)	Gold	20,000^{‡}
Chile	4× Platinum	80,000
Colombia	Diamond	150,000
Italy (FIMI)	Gold	25,000^{‡}
Mexico (AMPROFON)	4× Platinum	240,000^{‡}
United States (RIAA)	Diamond (Latin)	600,000^{‡}
^{‡} Sales+streaming figures based on certification alone.

== See also ==
- List of number-one Billboard Latin Albums from the 2010s
