= El Tiki =

Single by Maluma

from the album Pretty Boy, Dirty Boy
- Released: 31 March 2015
- Genre: Reggaeton
- Length: 3:01
- Label: Sony Latin
- Songwriters: Arbelaez; Bryan Chaverra; Londono Jiménez; Juan Luis Londoño

Maluma singles chronology
| "Intentalo" (2014) | "El Tiki" (2015) | "Borró Cassette" (2015) |

"El Tiki" (English: "The Tiki") is a song by Colombian singer Maluma from his album Pretty Boy, Dirty Boy. Sony Music Latin released it as the album's first single on 31 March 2015. The song received a nomination for Best Urban Performance at the 16th Latin Grammy Awards.

== Lyric video ==
The lyric video for "El Tiki' was released on the Maluma's official Vevo account on 8 May 2015. It features scenes of Maluma himself lip-syncing to the song as well as footage of his fans dancing. The lyric video has been viewed over 155 million times.

== Live performances ==
"El Tiki" was performed live by Maluma in various concerts throughout 2016 as part of the set list of his tour in promotion of Pretty Boy, Dirty Boy. Las Vegas Sun journalist Chris Kudialis in review of a show in Las Vegas reported that the song "kept the crowd engaged".

== Charts ==
| Chart (2015) | Peak position |
|---|---|
| Colombia (National-Report) | 2 |
| Spain (Promusicae) | 53 |
| US Latin Rhythm Airplay | 15 |
