= Borró Cassette =

Single by Maluma

from the album Pretty Boy, Dirty Boy
- Released: 29 June 2015
- Genre: Reggaeton
- Length: 3:37
- Label: Sony Latin
- Songwriters: Bryan Snaider Lezcano Chaverra; Kevin Mauricio Jiménez; Juan Luis Londoño; Rene David Cano Rios; JY (El De La J)
- Producer: Rude Boyz

Maluma singles chronology
"El Tiki" (2015)	"Borró Cassette" (2015)	"Desde Esa Noche" (2016)

Music video
- "Borró Cassette" on YouTube

"Borró Cassette" (English: "Erased Cassette") is a song by Colombian singer Maluma taken from his second studio album Pretty Boy, Dirty Boy (2015). It was released as the album's second single on 29 June 2015 through Sony Music Latin. The song was critically well received, being nominated in various categories at Latin award ceremonies. Commercially, it was successful across countries of Latin America, topping the charts in Colombia and peaking within the top five on various Latin Billboard charts and Venezuela. A music video for the song was filmed at Meatpacking District, Manhattan under the direction of Ulysses Terrero. It premiered on Vevo on 28 August 2015 and it features Maluma at a party. In order to further promote "Borró Cassette", Maluma performed it live during his numerous appearances on Latin music award shows.It has reached 1 Billion views in July 2021 to be on the side of each of Corazón, Sin Contrato and Felices los 4 on the pretty boy's Billion views list

== Composition and reception ==
Maluma recorded a "salsa choke" version of the song which was released as a single on 2 October 2015. Lyrically, the song talks about a female who forgets about a party she had with the male protagonist the previous night. He, however hopes to relieve the night when they were drunk, evident in the lines sung by Maluma, "We made love, we had a good time, and now you're telling me you erased the tape?". The title, "borró cassette", translated to English to "erasing the tape" is "an expression for pretending something, usually a relationship or romantic encounter, didn't happen in the first place".

Nick Murray of Rolling Stone wrote that "its languid beat suggests the kind of sounds that might have put him [Maluma] and his boo in motion". "Borró Cassette" was nominated in the category for Top Latin Song at the 2016 Billboard Music Awards, but lost to "El Perdón" by Nicky Jam and Enrique Iglesias. At the 2016 Billboard Latin Music Awards, the song was nominated in the category for Latin Rhythm Song of the Year. At the 2016 Premios Juventud, "Borró Cassette" is currently nominated in the category titled "La Más Pegajosa".

== Music video ==
A music video for "Borró Cassette", directed by Ulysses Terrero, was filmed in New York City at the Meatpacking District, Manhattan. It was released on Maluma's official Vevo channel on 28 August 2015 after several teasers were released on various social media platforms. During an interview, Maluma talked about the concept behind the clip and the lyrics, saying that together they represent a common situation a lot of people could identify with. The clip mostly features scenes filmed at a party. It features a female waking up in a room in the morning and not remembering where she is. Reviewing the clip for Billboard, Angie Romero described it "just as hot as you might imagine". It topped HTV's list of the most-watched music videos in Latin America in mid-2016.

== Live performances ==
Maluma performed "Borró Cassette" during the 12th Annual Premios Juventud held on 16 July 2015. A clip of the performance was later uploaded on the singer's official Vevo account on YouTube on 31 July 2015. He also performed the song at the inaugural Latin American Music Awards of 2015 on 8 October where he entered and performed with a hoverboard. A writer of Peru.com called his performance "magnificent" and another one from Telemundo called it "unforgettable". In November, 2015 Maluma sang "Borró Cassette" at the reality show La Voz Kids Colombia where he was also a part of the jury. For the performance, he was joined by singer Pipe Bueno and sang several verses of the salsa version of the song. Maluma also performed it throughout 2016 as part of the set list of his tour in promotion of Pretty Boy, Dirty Boy.

== Charts ==
=== Weekly charts ===
Chart (2015–16)	Peak position
Colombia (National-Report)	1
Dominican Republic (Monitor Latino)	15
US Hot Latin Songs (Billboard)	3
US Latin Airplay (Billboard)	1
US Latin Rhythm Airplay (Billboard)	1
US Tropical Airplay (Billboard)	1
Spain (PROMUSICAE)	23
Venezuela (Record Report)	4

Chart (2026)	Peak position
Bolivia (Billboard)	24

=== Year-end charts ===
Chart (2015)	Position
US Hot Latin Songs (Billboard)	28
Chart (2016)	Position
Spain (PROMUSICAE)	18
US Hot Latin Songs (Billboard)	12

== Certifications ==
Region	Certification	Certified units/sales
Brazil (Pro-Música Brasil)	2× Platinum	120,000^{‡}
Italy (FIMI)	Gold	25,000^{‡}
Mexico (AMPROFON)	2× Diamond+4× Platinum	840,000^{‡}
Spain (Promusicae)	4× Platinum	160,000^{‡}
^{‡} Sales+streaming figures based on certification alone.

== See also ==
- List of number-one songs of 2015 (Colombia)
- List of Billboard number-one Latin songs of 2015
