= El Perdedor (Maluma song) =

"El perdedor"
- X version cover

Single by Maluma

from the album Pretty Boy, Dirty Boy
- Released: 22 April 2016
- Genre: Reggaeton
- Length: 3:27
- Label: Sony Latin
- Songwriters: JY (El De La J); Maluma; Kevin Mauricio Jiménez; Bryan Snaider Lezcano Chaverra; Miky la Sensa
- Producer: Rude Boyz

Maluma singles chronology
"Desde Esa Noche" (2016)	"El perdedor" (2016)	"Sim ou Não" (2016)

Music video
- "El Perdedor"(Spanish Ver.) on YouTube "El Perdedor"(Brazilian Portuguese Ver.) on YouTube

"El perdedor" (English: "The Loser") is a song by Colombian singer Maluma taken from his second studio album Pretty Boy, Dirty Boy (2015). Sony Music Latin released it as the album's third single on 9 February 2016 following fan demand. It was written by JY (El De La J) and Maluma alongside Kevin Mauricio Jiménez, Bryan Snaider Lezcano Chaverra and Miky la Sensa. Two remix versions were available for purchase; one featuring Puerto Rican singer Yandel and the other being an EDM version. A Brazilian Portuguese version of the song featuring Brazilian duo Bruninho e Davi was released on 30 May 2017. Commercially, the song was successful across countries of Latin America topping the charts in Colombia and Mexico. It also entered the top ten of many Billboard Latin charts, peaking at number four on the main Hot Latin Songs chart.

A music video directed by Jessy Térrero was filmed in Los Angeles and premiered on 22 April 2016. It was meant to illustrate US police racism towards people of Latin descent, a concept seen in the video when Maluma gets arrested because of a forbidden relationship with an American police officer's daughter. The clip received praise for the topics it analyzed and Maluma's acting skills. To further promote the song, Maluma performed it live during his tour in support of Pretty Boy, Dirty Boy and at the 2016 Premios Juventud.

== Background and release ==
"El Perdedor" was selected as the third single of Pretty Boy, Dirty Boy due to high demand by Maluma's fans on social media. It was sent to radio stations on 9 February 2016. "El Perdedor" is musically complete with reggaeton beats and a tropical sound over which Maluma sings about heartbreak and his need to reconcile with a former lover. He switches the vocal styles from singing to rapping throughout the song. Lucas Villa from AXS praised Maluma's vocal abilities filled with "swagger" and added "there's no doubts that he's winning plenty of hearts with this fresh cut". On 24 June 2016, a remix version of "El Perdedor" featuring Puerto Rican singer Yandel was available for digital download. Maluma released an EDM version of the song on 15 July 2016. The song was made available for purchase on the iTunes Store the same day. Talking about the version, Maluma explained, "The original version of 'El perdedor' was made with a lot of love but I did this EDM song because on a musical level, I'm trying to experiment and see what the future of music is. I'm trying to go into the American market but still sing in Spanish."

== Chart performance ==
"El Perdedor" jumped from the position of seven to the top of the Mexican Monitor Latino chart for the week of March 14. In Colombia, "El Perdedor" climbed to the top of the singles chart where it stayed for several weeks.

== Music video ==
A music video for the song, directed by Jessy Terrero was filmed in various locations in Los Angeles in late March 2016. In order to promote the clip, Maluma reposted numerous Dubsmash videos of fans answering the phone to the opening lyrics of "El Perdedor" on his Instagram profile prior to its release. He also posted various pictures of the video shoot. Days leading to the music video's release, footage showing him being violently arrested by the police surfaced online and it was not disclosed what were the reasons behind the arrest. Maluma released a video statement to his fans regarding the situation, saying,

Thank you for worrying about me. I want to let you all know that I'm fine. Things didn't go too far in this case. I know this is an alarming situation, but I want you all to be patient, and I will talk about it on Friday. I'm moving forward with my life and this Friday, I will give as many declarations as I have to on the subject. Sending you a lot of hugs and kisses, and thank you for being there for me. I love you."

It was later revealed that the arrest was part of the video itself and served as a promotion. The clip premiered on Maluma's official Vevo account on 22 April 2016. Upon its release, Maluma clarified that it was meant to showcase the racism and discrimination by the US police to people of Latin descent living in the country. He further called it a "worrying situation" and added that "it shows why we need to be united now more than ever". A similar storyline is present in the video; Maluma gets arrested due to a relationship with an American police officer's daughter who strongly opposes against it. Maluma's girlfriend in the clip is played by model Angelique Cooper. In the beginning, he appears walking down the street when a police car stops him and an officer threatens him to stop "messing around" with his daughter. As the video proceeds, Maluma is seen together with Cooper in various love scenes, keeping their relationship secret. However, he watches her from afar and realizes that she is in a relationship with another man. During the end, Maluma confronts the boyfriend and gets arrested by the police. The video ends with the pair kissing each other and a quote in Spanish follows translating to, "Race, color, religion, gender nor social class should be an obstacle for love. Latinos Unidos." Jessica Lucia Roiz of Latin Times deemed the quote as a "wonderful message". A writer for Los 40 felt that the clip was released in a delicate and right moment for the fight against the discrimination of Hispanics in the US. PopSugar writer Macy Daniela Martin was very positive towards Maluma's acting skills and the video's story. She called it "basically a full-on short film, featuring all the action shots and bold definition you can handle in under five minutes". Lucas Villa of AXS wrote that the storyline of the video was "cinematic-like".

As of January 2018, the video has received over 1.1 billion views on YouTube.

== Reception and accolades ==
"El Perdedor" was nominated for the Lo Nuestro Award for Urban Song of the Year, which it lost to "Hasta el Amanecer" by American artist Nicky Jam.

== Live performances ==
"El Perdedor" was performed by Maluma in various concerts throughout 2016 as part of the set list of his tour in promotion of Pretty Boy, Dirty Boy. Las Vegas Sun journalist Chris Kudialis in review of a show in Las Vegas reported that the song "kept the crowd engaged". On 14 July 2016, Maluma performed a remix hip hop version of the song at the 2016 Premios Juventud. The scene was constructed to emulate 1980s New York City streets and Maluma appeared dancing accompanied by a group of male dancers; later on, another group of female dancers appeared during which the two groups had a dance off. A writer of Univision praised him for his "irresistible movements" while another one from HSB Noticias noted that he managed to make an "unforgettable show" with his urban style and "sexy movements".

== Charts ==
=== Weekly charts ===
Chart (2016)	Peak position
Colombia (National-Report)	1
Mexico (Billboard Mexican Airplay)	1
Mexico (Monitor Latino)	1
US Bubbling Under Hot 100 (Billboard)	25
US Hot Latin Songs (Billboard)	4
US Latin Airplay (Billboard)	1
US Latin Rhythm Airplay (Billboard)	1
US Latin Pop Airplay (Billboard)	4
US Tropical Airplay (Billboard)	6

=== Year-end charts ===
Chart (2016)	Position
Spain (PROMUSICAE)	58
US Hot Latin Songs (Billboard)	7

== Certifications ==
Region	Certification	Certified units/sales
Brazil (Pro-Música Brasil)	3× Platinum	180,000^{‡}
Italy (FIMI)	Gold	25,000^{‡}
Mexico (AMPROFON)	Diamond+3× Platinum+Gold	510,000^{‡}
Spain (Promusicae)	2× Platinum	80,000^{‡}
^{‡} Sales+streaming figures based on certification alone.

== See also ==
- List of number-one songs of 2016 (Mexico)
