= List of Becky G live performances =

Becky G live performances
- Gomez in 2023
- Concert tours: 2
- Co-headlining tours: 1
- Live performances: 154

American singer Becky G has released five studio albums. This has resulted in three concert tours, TV, music festivals and award shows performances. She first gained recognition in 2011 when she began posting videos of herself covering popular songs online. One of her videos caught the attention of record producer Dr. Luke, who subsequently offered her a record deal with Kemosabe Records in a joint venture with RCA Records.

Gomez opened for Demi Lovato and Katy Perry on select dates of their Demi and Prismatic world tours (2014) in both the United States and Mexico.

She embarked on a co-headlining tour with J Balvin during September and October 2015, spanning throughout the United States. Gomez was the opening act for American girl group Fifth Harmony, for the Latin American leg of their PSA Tour, with shows in Argentina, Chile, and Mexico.

She embarked on her self-titled tour in late 2019, visiting Hispanic countries. After the release of her debut studio album, Mala Santa, Gomez's announced the Mala Santa 2020 Tour, but it was canceled following the outbreak of the COVID-19 pandemic.

Her first headlining concert series, titled Mi Casa, Tu Casa Tour took place in 2023 in North America in support of her third studio album Esquinas. Her fourth studio album, Encuentros, was supported by her second headlining tour, titled Casa Gomez: Otro Capítulo Tour, and visit several cities in the United States in 2024.

Gomez was opening act for Karol G's tour, Viajando Por El Mundo Tour (2026). She joined for 16 shows across the United States, Canada and Mexico.

== Concert tours ==
=== Headlining ===
List of concert tours, showing dates, associated album(s), number of shows, and relevant statistics
Title	Dates	Associated album(s)	Continent(s)	Shows	Gross	Attendance	Ref.
Mi Casa, Tu Casa Tour	September 14 – October 15, 2023	Mala Santa; Esquemas; Esquinas	North America	20	$4,391,028	56,128+	
Casa Gomez: Otro Capítulo Tour	October 11 – November 21, 2024	Esquinas; Encuentros	North America	18	—N/a	—N/a	

=== Co-headlining ===
Title	Co-headliner(s)	Dates	Continent(s)	Shows	Ref.
La Familia Tour	J Balvin	September 23 – October 25, 2015	North America	20	

=== Promotional concerts ===
Title	Dates	Continent(s)	Shows	Ref.
Becky G Tour	March 1 – July 7, 2019	South America; North America; Spain	22	

=== As opening act ===
List of concert tours as opening act, showing dates and headlining artist(s)
Title	Dates	Headlining artist(s)	Countries/Territories	Ref.
Demi World Tour	September 14 – October 2, 2014	Demi Lovato	United States	
Prismatic World Tour	October 10 – October 18, 2014	Katy Perry	United States and Mexico	
Talk Dirty Tour	October 21 – November 2, 2014	Jason Derulo	United States	
PSA Tour	September 29 – October 12, 2017	Fifth Harmony	Latin America	
Enrique Iglesias and Pitbull Live	November 11 – November 16, 2017	Enrique Iglesias and Pitbull	United States	
Viajando Por El Mundo Tour	July 29 – November 15, 2026	Karol G	North America and Mexico	

== Live performances ==
=== Award shows ===
Event	Date	City	Performed song(s)	Ref.
14th Annual Latin Grammy Awards	November 21, 2013	Las Vegas	"La Temperatura" (with Maluma)	
2014 Radio Disney Music Awards	April 26, 2014	Los Angeles	"Can't Get Enough"	
2014 Premios Juventud	July 17, 2014	Miami	"Shower"	
2014 Teen Choice Awards	August 10, 2014	Los Angeles	"Shower"	
American Music Awards 2014	November 23, 2014	Los Angeles	"Can't Stop Dancin'"	
Premio Lo Nuestro 2015	February 19, 2015	Miami	"Como Tú No Hay Dos" (with Thalía)	
2015 Radio Disney Music Awards	April 25, 2015	Los Angeles	"Lovin' So Hard" / "Shower"	
2015 Premios Juventud	July 16, 2015	Miami	"Can't Stop Dancin'" (with J Balvin)	
2016 Premios Juventud	July 14, 2016	Miami	"Sola"	
Latin American Music Awards 2016	October 6, 2016	Los Angeles	"Mangú"	
Latin American Music Awards 2017	October 26, 2017	Los Angeles	"Mayores" (with Bad Bunny)	
2018 Billboard Latin Music Awards	April 26, 2018	Las Vegas	"Dura" (with Daddy Yankee, Bad Bunny and Natti Natasha)	
2018 MTV MIAW Awards	June 3, 2018	Mexico City	"Sin Pijama" (with Natti Natasha)	
2018 Premios Juventud	July 22, 2018	Miami	"Zooted" · "Sin Pijama" (with Natti Natasha)	
Latin American Music Awards 2018	October 25, 2018	Los Angeles	"Díganle" (with Leslie Grace and CNCO) · "Pienso en Ti" (with Joss Favela)	
Spotify Secret Genius Awards	November 16, 2018	Los Angeles	"Sin Pijama" / "Mayores" (with Mario Cáceres and Yamil Marrufo)	
2019 Billboard Latin Music Awards	April 25, 2019	Las Vegas	"Banana" (with Anitta)	
Latin American Music Awards 2019	October 17, 2019	Los Angeles	"Mayores" / "Sin Pijama" / "Mala Santa" · "Dollar" (with Myke Towers)	
2019 MTV Europe Music Awards	November 3, 2019	Seville	"Cómo No" (with Akon) · "24/7" / "Mayores" / "Sin Pijama"	
LOS40 Music Awards 2019	November 8, 2019	Madrid	"Sin Pijama" / "Mayores" / "Mala Santa"	
Premio Lo Nuestro 2020	February 20, 2020	Miami	"Perdiendo la Cabeza" (with Carlos Rivera and Pedro Capó)	
2021 Premios Juventud	July 22, 2021	Miami	"Fulanito" (with El Alfa)	
8th Platino Awards	October 3, 2021	Madrid	"Sin Pijama" / "Fulanito"	
22nd Annual Latin Grammy Awards	November 18, 2021	Las Vegas	"Pa Mis Muchachas" (with Christina Aguilera, Nicki Nicole and Nathy Peluso)	
94th Academy Awards	March 27, 2022	Los Angeles	"We Don't Talk About Bruno" (with Luis Fonsi, Megan Thee Stallion and cast from Encanto)	
2022 Billboard Music Awards	May 15, 2022	Las Vegas	"Bailé Con Mi Ex" / "Mamiii"	
2022 MTV MIAW Awards	July 10, 2022	Mexico City	"Tajin" (with Guaynaa)	
Premios de la Radio	November 3, 2022	Mexico City	"Ya Acabó" (with Marca MP) · "Mamiii"	
Billboard Women in Music	March 1, 2023	Los Angeles	"Mamiii"	
Latin American Music Awards 2023	April 20, 2023	Las Vegas	"Chanel" (with Peso Pluma)	
96th Academy Awards	March 10, 2024	Los Angeles	"The Fire Inside"	
Latin American Music Awards 2024	April 25, 2024	Las Vegas	"Mercedes" (with Óscar Maydon)	
25th Annual Latin Grammy Awards	November 14, 2024	Miami	"Por el Contrario" (with Ángela Aguilar, Leonardo Aguilar and Édgar Barrera)	
Premio Lo Nuestro 2025	February 20, 2025	Miami	"Querido Abuelo"	
American Music Awards 2025	May 26, 2025	Las Vegas	"Que Haces" (with Manuel Turizo)	
Billboard Latin Women in Music	April 23, 2026	Miami	"Dreaming of You"	

=== Music Festivals ===
Event	Date	City	Performed song(s)	Ref.
Jingle Ball Tour 2014	December 5, 2014	Saint Paul	"Shower" · "Can't Stop Dancin'" · "Say It"	
KDWB's Jingle Ball	December 8, 2014	Minneapolis–Saint Paul	"Shower" · "Can't Stop Dancin'" · "Say It"	
103.5 KISS FM's Jingle Ball	December 18, 2014	Rosemont	"Shower" · "Can't Stop Dancin'" · "Say It"	
Y100 Jingle Ball	December 21, 2014	Sunrise	"Shower" · "Can't Stop Dancin'" · "Say It"	
DIRECTV Super Fan Festival	January 29, 2015	Glendale	—N/a	
iHeartRadio Fiesta Latina	November 7, 2015	Miami	—N/a	
KIIS-FM Jingle Ball	November 14, 2015	Seattle	—N/a	
Latino Mix Live!	November 12, 2017	Dallas	—N/a	
Los Dells Festival	September 3, 2017	Wisconsin	—N/a	
Calibash	January 20, 2018	Los Angeles	—N/a	
Fiesta de la Flor	April 14, 2018	Texas	—N/a	
Mega Mezcla	April 20, 2018	Newark	—N/a	
¡Viva Latino! Live	August 23, 2018	Rosemont	—N/a	
Noche de Estrellas Fidelity	August 24, 2018	San Juan	—N/a	
Coca-Cola Music Experience	October 6, 2018	Madrid	—N/a	
El Bueno, La Mala Y El Feo Fest	October 13, 2018	Inglewood	—N/a	
Mala Luna Music Festival	October 27, 2018	San Antonio	—N/a	
iHeartRadio Fiesta Latina	November 3, 2018	Miami	—N/a	
Mega Bash	December 5, 2018	New York City	—N/a	
Coca-Cola Flow Fest	December 8, 2018	Mexico City	—N/a	
Calibash	January 20, 2019	Los Angeles	—N/a	
Viña del Mar International Song Festival	March 1, 2019	Viña del Mar	"Booty" · "Sola" · "Dura" / "Mad Love" · "Mayores" · "Bubalu" · "Mala Mía" · "Cuando Te Besé" · "Sin Pijama"	
Non Stop the Madness (Note: Part of the Becky G Tour 2019.)	March 3, 2019	Cochabamba	"Zooted" · "Mad Love" · "Booty" · "Can't Stop Dancin'" · "Sola" · "Mayores" · "LBD" · "Cuando Te Besé" · "Sin Pijama"	
Gallo Evolution	April 17, 2019	Escuintla	"Zooted" · "Dura" · "Mad Love" · "Booty" · "Sola" · "Bubalu" · "Mangú" · "Mala Mía" · "Banana" · "LBD" · "Todo Cambió" · "Díganle" · "Mayores" · "Ya Es Hora" · "Cuando Te Besé" · "Sin Pijama"	
Summer Breeze	May 18, 2019	Chicago	—N/a	
Barrio Latino	June 1, 2019	Lima	"Booty" · "Sola" · "Dura" · "Mad Love" · "Mayores" · "Todo Cambió" · "Bubalu" · "Mala Mía" · "La Respuesta" · "Cuando Te Besé" · "Sin Pijama"	
KTUphoria	June 15, 2019	New York City	"Zooted" · "Mad Love" · "Booty" · "Green Light Go" · "La Respuesta" · "Mayores" · "Sin Pijama"	
Share Festival	June 28, 2019	Barcelona	"Zooted" · "Dura" · "Mad Love" · "Bubalu" · "Booty" · "Díganle" · "Can't Stop Dancin'" · "Mala Mía" · "La Respuesta" · "Mangú" · "Todo Cambió" · "Banana" · "Mayores" · "Ya Es Hora" · "Cuando Te Besé" · "Sin Pijama"	
FEN Festival	June 29, 2019	Vila-real	"Zooted" · "Dura" · "Mad Love" · "Bubalu" · "Booty" · "Díganle" · "Can't Stop Dancin'" · "Mala Mía" · "La Respuesta" · "Mangú" · "Todo Cambió" · "Banana" · "Mayores" · "Ya Es Hora" · "Cuando Te Besé" · "Sin Pijama"	
Metropoli Festival	June 30, 2019	Ibiza	"Zooted" · "Mad Love" · "Todo Cambió" · "Booty" · "Green Light Go" · "La Respuesta" · "Cuando Te Besé" · "Ya Es Hora" · "Mayores" · "Sin Pijama"	
Weekend Beach Festival	July 5, 2019	Torre del Mar	"Zooted" · "Mad Love" · "Todo Cambió" · "Booty" · "Green Light Go" · "La Respuesta" · "Cuando Te Besé" · "Ya Es Hora" · "Mayores" · "Sin Pijama"	
Yolo Music Festival	July 7, 2019	Madrid	"Zooted" · "Mad Love" · "Todo Cambió" · "Booty" · "Green Light Go" · "La Respuesta" · "Cuando Te Besé" · "Ya Es Hora" · "Mayores" · "Sin Pijama"	
Reggaeton Beach Festival Benidorm	July 13, 2019	Benidorm	"Zooted" · "Mad Love" · "Dura" · "Booty" · "Green Light Go" · "Dollar" · "Mala Mía" · "La Respuesta" · "Cuando Te Besé" · "Ya Es Hora" · "Todo Cambió" · "Mayores" · "Sin Pijama"	
Canarias Baila Festival	July 18, 2019	Las Palmas	"Zooted" · "Mad Love" · "Dura" · "Booty" · "Green Light Go" · "Dollar" · "Mala Mía" · "La Respuesta" · "Cuando Te Besé" · "Ya Es Hora" · "Todo Cambió" · "Mayores" · "Sin Pijama"	
Canarias Baila Festival	July 19, 2019	Tenerife	"Zooted" · "Mad Love" · "Dura" · "Booty" · "Green Light Go" · "Dollar" · "Mala Mía" · "La Respuesta" · "Cuando Te Besé" · "Ya Es Hora" · "Todo Cambió" · "Mayores" · "Sin Pijama"	
Reggaeton Beach Festival Mallorca	July 20, 2019	Palma de Mallorca	"Zooted" · "Mad Love" · "Dura" · "Booty" · "Green Light Go" · "Dollar" · "Mala Mía" · "La Respuesta" · "Cuando Te Besé" · "Ya Es Hora" · "Todo Cambió" · "Mayores" · "Sin Pijama"	
Feria de las Flores 2019	August 3, 2019	Medellín	"Dura" / "Mad Love" · "Que Me Baile" · "Dollar" · "Mayores" · "Sin Pijama"	
Baja Beach Fest	August 17, 2019	Rosarito	—N/a	
Mega Bash	November 29, 2019	New Jersey	—N/a	
TANGA! XXL	December 8, 2019	Madrid	—N/a	
San Antonio Stock Show & Rodeo	February 13, 2020	San Antonio	—N/a	
Houston Livestock Show and Rodeo	March 5, 2020	Houston	—N/a	
Baja Beach Fest	August 15, 2021	Rosarito	"Mala Santa" · "Dollar" · "Dura" / "Mad Love" / "Tip Pon It" · "Ram Pam Pam" · "Fulanito" (with El Alfa) · "Mayores" · "Sin Pijama" · "Cuando Te Besé" · "Te Va Bien" · "Peleas" · "Bubalu" · "La Curiosidad" · "Booty" · "Qué Maldición" (with Banda MS)	
Calibash	January 14, 2022	Los Angeles	—N/a	
Universal Studios' Mardi Gras	March 13, 2022	Orlando	—N/a	
Coachella 2022 (Note: Gomez appeared as a surprise guest performer on the of Karol G's set on Coachella.)	April 17, 2022	Indio	"Mamiii" (with Karol G)	
Coachella 2022	April 24, 2022	Indio	"Mamiii" (with Karol G)	
Vibra Urbana Fest	April 30, 2022	Las Vegas	—N/a	
Channel 93.3 Summer Kickoff	June 3, 2022	San Diego	—N/a	
Wango Tango	June 4, 2022	Los Angeles	"Fulanito" · "Buen Dia" · "Dollar" · "Mayores" · "Bailé Con Mi Ex" · "Mamiii"	
Governors Ball Music Festival	June 12, 2022	New York City	"Fulanito" · "Buen Dia" · "Dollar" · "Ram Pam Pam" · "Mayores" · "Sin Pijama" · "Shower" · "Cuando Te Besé" · "Bailé Con Mi Ex" · "Tajin" · "Guapa" · "No Mienten" · "Mamiii"	
Viva! L.A. Music Festival	June 25, 2022	Los Angeles	—N/a	
Festival d'été de Québec	July 14, 2022	Quebec City	"Fulanito" · "Buen Dia" · "Dollar" · "Borracha" · "Ram Pam Pam" · "Mayores" · "Sin Pijama" · "Bailé Con Mi Ex" · "Tajin" · "Que Le Muerda" · "Guapa" / "Salió el Sol" · "No Mienten" · "Mamiii" · "Shower"	
Lollapalooza	August 1, 2022	Chicago	"Chicken Noodle Soup" (with J-Hope)	
Uforia Latino Mix Live	August 6, 2022	Dallas	"Fulanito" · "Buen Dia" · "Mayores" · "Sin Pijama" · "Bailé Con Mi Ex" · "Tajin" · "Shower" · "Mamiii"	
Rumbazo Latin Music Festival	September 10, 2022	Las Vegas	—N/a	
iHeartRadio Fiesta Latina	October 15, 2022	Miami	"Fulanito" · "Buen Dia" · "Bailé Con Mi Ex" · "Mayores" · "Shower" · "Mamiii"	
Calibash	January 22, 2023	Los Angeles	—N/a	
Coachella 2023	April 14, 2023	Indio	"Mayores" · "Fulanito" · "Cuando Te Besé" · "Bailé Con Mi Ex" · "Ya Acabó" (Note: During the first weekend set, she was joined by Marca MP.) · "Te Quiero Besar" (Note: During the first weekend set, she was joined by José Ortiz Paz of Fuerza Regida.) · "Chanel" (Note: During the first weekend set, she was joined by Peso Pluma.) · "Arranca" · "Sin Pijama" (Note: During the second weekend set, she was joined by Natti Natasha.) · "Mamiii" · "Shower" · "People" (with Libianca) (April 21) · Tribute to Selena (Note: "Como la Flor" / "La Carcacha" / "Bidi Bidi Bom Bom" / "Baila Esta Cumbia".) (April 21)	
Coachella 2023	April 21, 2023	Indio	"Mayores" · "Fulanito" · "Cuando Te Besé" · "Bailé Con Mi Ex" · "Ya Acabó" · "Te Quiero Besar" · "Chanel" · "Arranca" · "Sin Pijama" · "Mamiii" · "Shower" · "People" (with Libianca) (April 21) · Tribute to Selena (April 21)	
Tecate Emblema Festival	May 14, 2023	Tecate	"Mayores" / "Fulanito" · "Cuando Te Besé" · "Bailé Con Mi Ex" · "Ya Acabó" · "Chanel" · Tribute to Selena · "Arranca" · "Buen Dia" · "Sin Pijama" · "Mamiii" · "Shower"	
Fuego Fuego Festival	May 27, 2023	Montreal	"Mayores" / "Fulanito" · "Cuando Te Besé" · "Bailé Con Mi Ex" · "Ya Acabó" · "Chanel" · "Arranca" · "Sin Pijama" · "Mamiii" · "Shower"	
Sueños Music Festival 2023	May 28, 2023	Chicago	"Mayores" · "Fulanito" · "Cuando Te Besé" · "Bailé Con Mi Ex" · "Ya Acabó" · "Chanel" · "Arranca" · "Sin Pijama" · "Mamiii" · "Shower"	
Baja Beach Fest	August 12, 2023	Rosarito	"Mayores" · "Fulanito" · "Buen Dia" · "Bailé Con Mi Ex" · "Cuando Te Besé" · "Ya Acabó" · "Chanel" · "La Nena" · "Querido Abuelo" · "Cries in Spanish" · Tribute to Selena · "Dolores" · "Mala Santa" · "Dollar" · "Arranca" · "Sin Pijama" · "Mamiii" · "Shower"	
Coachella 2024 (Note: Gomez appeared as a surprise guest performer on the of Peso Pluma's set on Coachella.)	April 12, 2024	Indio	"Chanel" (with Peso Pluma)	
Baja Beach Fest	August 10, 2024	Rosarito	"Mayores" · "Fulanito" · "Bailé Con Mi Ex" · "Cuando Te Besé" · "Ya Acabó" · "Chanel" · "La Nena" · "Por el Contrario" · "2ndo Chance" · Tribute to Selena · "Dolores" · "Arranca" · "Sin Pijama" · "Mamiii" · "Shower" · "Bluetooth" (with Mariachi Divas)	
Dale Mixx	August 17, 2024	Monterrey	"Mayores" · "Fulanito" · "Bailé Con Mi Ex" · "Cuando Te Besé" · "Ya Acabó" · "Chanel" · "La Nena" · "Por El Contrario" · "2ndo Chance" · Tribute to Selena · "Dolores" · "Arranca" · "Sin Pijama" · "Mamiii" · "Shower"	
Minnesota State Fair	August 22, 2024	Minnesota	"Mayores" · "Fulanito" · "Bailé Con Mi Ex" · "Cuando Te Besé" · "Ya Acabó" · "Chanel" · "La Nena" · "Por El Contrario" · "2ndo Chance" · Tribute to Selena · "Dolores" · "Arranca" · "Sin Pijama" · "Mamiii" · "Shower"	
New Mexico State Fair	September 7, 2024	Albuquerque	—N/a	
Coachella 2025 (Note: Gomez appeared as a surprise guest performer on the of Tyla and Gustavo Dudamel with Los Angeles Philharmonic's set on Coachella.)	April 12, 2025	Indio	"On My Body" (with Tyla)	
Coachella 2025	April 13, 2025	Indio	"Shower" (with Gustavo Dudamel and Los Angeles Philharmonic)	
Brookside at the Rose Bowl	May 24, 2025	Pasadena	—N/a	
Mawazine Festival	June 22, 2025	Rabat	—N/a	
Coachella 2026	April 12, 2026	Indio	"Mamiii" (with Karol G)	
Coachella 2026	April 19, 2026	Indio	"Mamiii" (with Karol G)	
Arizona State Fair	October 9, 2026	Phoenix	"Marathon" · "Patrona" · "Oasis" · "Fulanito" · "Que Haces" · "Chula" · "Bandera Blanca" · "Factos" · "Por el Contrario" · "Cuando Te Besé" · "Cntrl" · "Glitch" · "Perreo Triste" · "Sin Pijama" · "Mayores" · "Arranca" · "Mal Tiempo" · "2AM" · "Epa" · "Mamiii" · "Shower" · "Sorry Papi"	
Coachella 2027	April 11, 2027	Indio	TBA	
Coachella 2027	April 18, 2027	Indio	TBA	
BigSound Festival	June 2027	Valencia	TBA	

=== Other live performances ===
Event	Date	City	Performed song(s)	Ref.
The X Factor	November 22, 2012	Los Angeles	"Oath" (with Cher Lloyd)	
Macy's Thanksgiving Day Parade	November 27, 2014	New York City	"Can't Stop Dancin'"	
The Ellen DeGeneres Show	January 21, 2015	Burbank	"Can't Stop Dancin'"	
Copa América Centenario final	June 21, 2016	New Jersey	"Superstar" (with Pitbull)	
La Banda	October 30, 2016	Miami	"Sola" · "Mangú"	
Don Francisco Te Invita	March 12, 2017	Miami	"Todo Cambió"	
Operación Triunfo	October 30, 2017	Barcelona	"Mayores"	
La Vida Moderna	November 3, 2017	Madrid	"Mayores"	
Dancing with the Stars	November 21, 2017	Los Angeles	"Christmas C'mon" (with Lindsey Stirling)	
Kennedy Center Honors	December 8, 2017	Washington	"Mi Tierra" (with Miami Sound Machine)	
Pitbull After Dark Party	March 3, 2018	Miami	"Mad Love" · "Mayores"	
Pitbull After Dark Party	March 4, 2018	Miami	"Mad Love" · "Mayores"	
Good Morning America	March 21, 2018	New York City	"Mad Love" (with Sean Paul and David Guetta)	
F.A.M.E. Tour	April 11, 2018	Inglewood	"Mayores" (with Maluma)	
Factor X	June 29, 2018	Madrid	"Ya Es Hora" (with Ana Mena) · "Sin Pijama"	
Bailando con las estrellas	July 3, 2018	Barcelona	"Sin Pijama"	
Don Francisco Te Invita	August 19, 2018	Miami	"Sin Pijama"	
Teletón Chile	December 1, 2018	Santiago	"Mayores" · "Sin Pijama" · "Díganle" (with Leslie Grace)	
Pandora's El Pulso	December 6, 2018	Los Angeles	—N/a	
X 100pre Tour	March 8, 2019	San Juan	"Mayores" (with Bad Bunny)	
X 100pre Tour	April 22, 2019	Los Angeles	"Mayores" (with Bad Bunny)	
Amazon Prime Day Concert	July 10, 2019	New York City	"La Respuesta" · "Cuando Te Besé" · "Dollar" · "Mayores" · "Sin Pijama"	
2019 Zumba Fitness Concert	July 26, 2019	Orlando	—N/a	
11:11 World Tour	September 8, 2019	Inglewood	"La Respuesta" (with Maluma)	
We Can Survive	October 19, 2019	Los Angeles	"Booty" · "Dura" · "Mad Love" · "Dollar" · "Mala Mía" · "Banana" · "Mayores" · "Sin Pijama"	
Tidal Rock the Vote	October 21, 2019	New York City	"Booty" · "Dura" · "Mad Love" · "Dollar" · "Mala Mía" · "Banana" · "Mayores" · "Sin Pijama"	
2019 League of Legends World Championship	November 10, 2019	Paris	"Giants" (with Keke Palmer, Duckwrth, Soyeon, and Thutmose)	
Disney Parks Christmas Day Parade	December 26, 2020	Orlando	"Santa Claus Is Comin' to Town" · "Feliz Navidad"	
Reventón de Verano	May 2, 2021	Los Angeles	"Mala Santa" · "Dollar" · "No Drama" · "Rotate" · "Dura" · "Mad Love" · "La Curiosidad" · "Peleas" · "Subiendo" · "Mala Mía" · "La Respuesta" · "Booty" · "Mayores" · "Sin Pijama"	
Latin Grammy Celebra Ellas y Su Música	May 9, 2021	Los Angeles	"Becky from the Block" · "Shower" · "Mayores" · "Sin Pijama"	
The Tonight Show Starring Jimmy Fallon	May 17, 2021	New York City	"Ram Pam Pam" (with Natti Natasha)	
Zouk Nightclub	May 5, 2022	Las Vegas	"Mala Santa" · "Dollar" · "No Drama" · "Rotate" / "Fulanito" · "Dura" / "Mad Love" / "Tip Pon It" · "Mala Mia" / "La Respuesta" · "Te Va Bien" · "Ram Pam Pam" · "No Mienten" · "Mamiii" · "Booty" · "Rebota" · "Mayores" · "Sin Pijama"	
Jimmy Kimmel Live!	May 25, 2022	Los Angeles	"Bailé Con Mi Ex"	
Tini Tour	September 25, 2022	Madrid	"La Loto" (with Tini)	
Strip Love Tour	October 22, 2022	Los Angeles	"Mamiii" (with Karol G)	
The Wonderful World of Disney: Magical Holiday Celebration	November 27, 2022	Orlando	"Frosty the Snowman" · "What Christmas Means to Me"	
WrestleMania 39	April 1, 2023	Los Angeles	"America the Beautiful"	
Mañana Será Bonito Tour	August 19, 2023	Pasadena	"Mamiii" (with Karol G)	
The Today Show	August 25, 2023	New York City	"Chanel" · "Shower" · "Mamiii" · "Arranca"	
Tyson Fury vs. Francis Ngannou	October 28, 2023	Riyadh	"Rotate" · "Buen Dia"	
Tiny Desk Concerts	October 13, 2023	Washington	"Bailé Con Mi Ex" · "Mamiii" · "Cries in Spanish" · "Shower"	
Mañana Será Bonito Tour	December 1, 2023	Medellín	"Mamiii" (with Karol G)	
Éxodo Tour	August 24, 2024	Inglewood	"Chanel" (with Peso Pluma)	
Mirada Tour	May 18, 2025	Dallas	"2ndo Chance" (with Iván Cornejo)	
Debí Tirar Más Fotos World Tour	January 10, 2026	Santiago	"Mayores" (with Bad Bunny) · "Mamiii"	
Finding Family on the Road	June 6, 2026	Los Angeles	"Shower" (with Alex Warren)	
La Voz Kids	June 27, 2026	Madrid	"Dreaming of You" / "El Beso del Final" (with Ana Mena)	
CBS Mornings	August 13, 2026	New York City	"Chula"	
Sandia Resort and Casino	October 6, 2026	Albuquerque	—N/a	
