= Mi Casa, Tu Casa Tour =

2023 concert tour by Becky G

- National tour by Becky G
- Location: North America
- Associated albums: Mala Santa; Esquemas; Esquinas
- Start date: September 14, 2023
- End date: October 15, 2023
- No. of shows: 20

Becky G concert chronology
- La Familia Tour (2015); Mi Casa, Tu Casa Tour (2023); Casa Gomez: Otro Capítulo Tour (2024)

The Mi Casa, Tu Casa Tour was the debut headlining concert tour by American singer Becky G, in support of her third studio album Esquinas (2023). The tour kicked off on September 14, 2023 at Boston’s Roadrunner, and ended on October 15, in Los Angeles, with the last three shows at The Novo. The live concert showcased all of the material from Gomez's third studio album in addition to her earlier music, and some songs from her debut and second studio albums, Mala Santa (2019) and Esquemas (2022).

== Background ==
On May 9, 2023, Gomez announced that she would be going on her debut concert tour throughout United States, in September of that year. In an interview with Variety, Gomez spoke about the tour, saying, “[The] ‘Mi Casa Tu Casa Tour’ is about inviting people into an intimate experience with me. My intention is for it to be a place where we can sing, dance, laugh, and cry, all in the comfort of our shared space. I’ve never headlined my own tour before, so I really want it to feel personal and connect with my fans in that way, because we’ll build ‘nuestra casa’ (our home) in every city, together.” Tickets and VIP packages for the tour went on-sale on May 12, at 10 a.m.; pre-sales began on May 9, with much of the tour selling-out quickly.

== Set list ==
1. "Mayores"
2. "Fulanito"
3. "Buen Dia"
4. "Bailé Con Mi Ex"
5. "Cuando Te Besé"
6. "Ya Acabó"
7. "Chanel"
8. "La Nena"
9. "Querido Abuelo"
10. "Cries in Spanish"
11. "2ndo Chance"
12. "Como la Flor" / "La Carcacha" / "Bidi Bidi Bom Bom" / "Baila Esta Cumbia" (Selena Cover)
13. "Dolores"
14. "Mala Santa"
15. "Dollar"
16. "Arranca"
17. "Sin Pijama"
18. "Mamiii"
19. "Becky from the Block"
20. "Shower"

Starting with the dates in Texas, the setlist was modified and surprise songs were added:

- "2ndo Chance"
- "Cuidadito"
- "Becky from the Block"
- "Ram Pam Pam"

=== Notes ===
- September 27 – Conexión Divina joins the Mi Casa, Tu Casa Tour to open the concerts in Sugarland, Texas.
- October 3 – Iván Cornejo performed "2ndo Chance" as a special guest with Becky G for the concert in El Paso, Texas.
- October 7 – Pedro Vargas "El Chato" from the group Marca MP is the special guest to sing the hit "Ya Acabó" with Becky G.
- October 12 – Gomez performed "Cuidadito" with Chiquis as a special guest.
- October 15 – Becky G brings DannyLux on stage to sing "Cries in Spanish" and Natti Natasha to sing "Sin Pijama" and "Ram Pam Pam".
- During the song "Dolores" at the closing of the tour, Becky brings her grandmothers on stage to dedicate the song to them. They were the last "Dolores girls."

== Shows ==
List of 2023 shows
Date (2023)	City	Country	Venue	Opening acts	Revenue
September 14	Boston	United States	Roadrunner	Awsumo	
September 15	New York City	United States	United Palace Theatre	Awsumo	$364,464
September 16	New York City	United States	United Palace Theatre	Awsumo	$364,464
September 17	Tysons	United States	Capital One Hall	Awsumo	Sold Out
September 19	Charlotte	United States	Ovens Auditorium	Awsumo	Sold Out
September 21	Atlanta	United States	The Eastern	Awsumo	Sold Out
September 22	Orlando	United States	Hard Rock Live Orlando	Awsumo	Sold Out
September 23	Hollywood	United States	Hard Rock Live	Awsumo	
September 27	Sugar Land	United States	Smart Financial Centre	Awsumo	Sold Out
September 28	Grand Prairie	United States	Texas Trust CU Theatre	Awsumo	
September 29	San Antonio	United States	Majestic Theatre	Awsumo	Sold Out
October 1	McAllen	United States	McAllen Performing Arts Center	Awsumo	Sold Out
October 3	El Paso	United States	Abraham Chavez Theatre	Awsumo	Sold Out
October 6	San Diego	United States	Balboa Theatre	Awsumo	Sold Out
October 7	Los Angeles	United States	The Novo	Awsumo	Sold Out
October 8	San Jose	United States	San Jose Center for the Performing Arts	Awsumo	Sold Out
October 10	San Jose	United States	San Jose Center for the Performing Arts	Awsumo	Sold Out
October 12	Los Angeles	United States	The Novo	Awsumo	Sold Out
October 14	Phoenix	United States	Arizona State Fair	Awsumo	7,500 tickets sold
October 15	Los Angeles	United States	The Novo	Awsumo	Sold Out
