= Simone Torres =

Simone Torres may refer to:

- Simone Torres (All My Children)
- Simone Torres (music producer)
- Simone Torres (singer)
