= Boys World =

American girl group

Background information
- Origin: Los Angeles, California, U.S.
- Genres: Pop; R&B
- Years active: 2019–2024
- Past members: Elana Caceres; Lillian Kay; Queenie Mae Villaluz; Makhyli Simpson; Olivia Ruby
- Website: boys.world

Boys World was an American girl group that was formed in Los Angeles in April 2019. The group was formed by KYN Entertainment after the company directors contacted each of the members on social media, having seen their singing videos online. The group was kept a secret until January 2020, when they began posting on social media. They released their debut single "Girlfriends" in October 2020, which was followed by an extended play, While You Were Out, in April 2021. On July 5, 2024, the group officially announced their disbandment via social media.

== History ==
=== 2019–2021: While You Were Out and Singles ===
In 2019, the members of Boys World were scouted by KYN Entertainment after the company directors had seen their singing videos online. Each member was sent a direct message on Instagram about the opportunity to be in a girl group. Villaluz, the first member to be contacted, took over a month to respond to the message as she had doubts over the genuineness of the message. Kay added that it was also "hard to believe" and that they had a lot of conversations with KYN, but once it had come into motion, it felt right for her. Sonny Takhar, the founder of KYN, stated that as the group was formed, the existing members were in charge of who else was added to the lineup. After Villaluz followed Simpson, Kay, Caceres and Ruby; the group was formed on April 26, 2019. Boys World was revealed to the public when they posted on their TikTok account in January 2020, after the group got a house in Los Angeles together. The term Boys in their name stands for Best of Your Self. On October 22, 2020, they released their debut single, "Girlfriends". The group stated that the "empowering girl anthem" is about their friendship with each other and that the recording of the song spanned across a year in order to perfect it.

They followed their first single with "Wingman" released on January 29, 2021. Clash magazine described the song as "an uplifting blast of energy", with Paper magazine writing that the song is "a verifiable girl power anthem". "Wingman" is the first song that Boys World recorded, so they felt it had "a special place in [their] heart". In February 2021, they performed the national anthem at the 2021 Puppy Bowl. In March 2021, the group released their third single, "Tiptoe". Clash noted that the song shows their potential and versatility as a group. On April 9, 2021, they released their debut extended play, While You Were Out.

On May 21, 2021, they released the single "All Me", which was followed up by "Something in the Water".

=== 2022–2024 ===
In July 2022, they released the single, "So What". On January 18, 2023, they released the single, "Mantrum". On June 2, they released the single "Me, My Girls & I". On August 2, they announced the single "Piña Colada", which was released on August 18. On July 5, 2024, the group officially announced their disbandment via social media.

== Discography ==
All credits adapted from Spotify and Apple Music.

=== Singles ===
Title	Year	Album	Writer(s)	Producer(s)
"Girlfriends"	2020	While You Were Out	No writers credited	Gino Barletta, Lindgren, Melanie Fontana
"Wingman"	2021	While You Were Out	Brett McLaughlin, Melanie Fontana, Allie X, Gino Barletta, Marc Himmel, Michael Schulz, Michel Schulz, Robert Marchetti	Gino Barletta, Lindgren, Melanie Fontana
"Tiptoe"	2021	While You Were Out	Kameron Glasper, Tayla Parx, Anton Göransson, Isabella Sjöstrand, Lara Marie Andersson, Marcus Andersson	Anton Göransson
"All Me"	2021	Non-album singles	No writers credited	Gino Barletta, Lindgren, Melanie Fontana
"Something in the Water"	2021	Non-album singles	Buzz, Oliver Frid, Ryan Daly, Tayla Parx	Oliver 'Junior' Frid, Tayla Parx
"So What"	2022	Me, My Girls & I	David Wilson, Avonlea, Elana Caceres, Gino Barletta, Lillian Kay, Makhyli, Olivia Ruby, Paris "PJ" Jones, Queenie Mae Villaluz, Wyatt Sanders	Dwilly
"Mantrum"	2023	Me, My Girls & I	Barry Cohen, Colin Magalong, Elana Caceres, Lillian Gillespie, Makhyli Simpson, Olivia Ruby, Queenie Mae Villaluz	Gingerbread, Simone Torres
"Me, My Girls & I"	2023	Me, My Girls & I	Liza Owen, Elana Caceres, Lillian Gillespie, Makhyli Simpson, Olivia Ruby, Queenie Mae Villaluz, Ryan Williamson	Rykeyz, Gino Barletta
"Piña Colada"	2023	Non-album singles	Ale Alberti, Elana Caceres, Jayme Silverstein, Lillian Gillespie, Makhyli Simpson, Olivia Ruby, Queenie Mae Villaluz, R8, Storri	Storii, Jayme Silverstein, R8
"Gone Girl"	2023	Non-album singles	Elana Caceres, Lillian Gillespie, Makhyli Simpson, Olivia Ruby, Queenie Mae Villaluz, Ryan Williamson, Whitney Phillips	Rykeyz
"The Bitch Who Stole Christmas"	2023	Non-album singles	Bendik Møller, Elana Caceres, Lillian Gillespie, Makhyli Simpson, Olivia Ruby, Queenie Mae Villaluz, Zachary Rosenblum	Bendik Møller, Zachary Rosenblum
"Caught in Your Love"	2024	Non-album singles	Amy Allen, Jason Evigan, Jonathan David Bellion	Jason Evigan, Smile High, Gino Barletta

=== Extended plays ===
Title	Details
While You Were Out	Released: April 9, 2021; Format: Digital download, streaming; Track listing: 1. "Girlfriends"; 2. "Wingman"; 3. "Tiptoe"; 4. "Relapse"; 5. "Touched by an Angel"
Me, My Girls & I	Released: June 23, 2023; Format: Digital download, streaming; Track listing: 1. "So What"; 2. "Mantrum"; 3. "Me, My Girls & I"; 4. "Funeral"; 5. "Wrong Side"

=== Music videos ===
Title	Year	Director(s)
"Girlfriends"	2020	Symone Ridgell
"Wingman"	2021	Symone Ridgell
"Relapse"	2021	Kai Cranmore
"All Me"	2021	Tusk
"Something in the Water"	2021	Chandler Lass
"So What"	2022	Alexandra Gavillet
"Mantrum"	2023	Angelica Valente & Pseudo
"Me, My Girls, & I"	2023	Sarah Eiseman & Andy Deluca
"Piña Colada"	2023	Zev York
"Gone Girl"	2023	None credited
"Caught in Your Love"	2024	Alexandra Gavillet
