= Rebota =

2018 single by Guaynaa

Single by Guaynaa
- English title: "Bounces"
- Released: 14 December 2018
- Genre: Reggaeton
- Length: 3:24
- Label: Guaynaa Records
- Songwriter(s): Jean Carlos Santiago; Enrique L. Piñeiro Rivera; Carlos de Jesús Rodríguez; Juan L. Rivera
- Producer(s): Enrique L. Piñeiro Rivera

Guaynaa singles chronology
"Pirateando" (2018)	"Rebota" (2018)	"Navidad en Puertorri" (2018)

Music video
- "Rebota" on YouTube

"Rebota" is a single by Puerto Rican rapper Guaynaa.

== Charts ==
Chart (2019)	Peak position
Argentina (Argentina Hot 100)	44
Mexico Espanol Airplay (Billboard)	43
Spain (PROMUSICAE)	72
US Hot Latin Songs (Billboard)	35
US Latin Airplay (Billboard)	33
US Latin Pop Airplay (Billboard)	35
US Latin Rhythm Airplay (Billboard)	19

== Certifications ==
Region	Certification	Certified units/sales
United States (RIAA)	4× Platinum (Latin)	240,000^{‡}
^{‡} Sales+streaming figures based on certification alone.

== Remix version ==
"Rebota (Remix)"

Single by Guaynaa, Nicky Jam and Farruko featuring Becky G and Sech

from the EP BRB Be Right Back
- Language: Spanish
- Released: 12 July 2019
- Length: 4:21
- Label: Guaynaa Records
- Songwriter(s): List: Jean Carlos Santiago; Enrique L. Piñeiro Rivera; Carlos De Jesús Rodríguez; Juan L. Rivera Medina; Nick Rivera Caminero; Juan Diego Medina; Rebbeca Marie Gomez; Carlos Efren Correa; Marcos G. Pérez; Franklin Jovani Martinez; Andy Bauza; Carlos Isaias Morales Williams; Jorge Valdés Vázquez; Luian Malave; Kedin Maisonet; Xavier Semper Vargas; Edgar W Semper Vargas; Wander Manuel Mendez; Pablo Christian Fuentes
- Producer(s): Enrique L. Piñeiro Rivera

Nicky Jam singles chronology
"Mona Lisa" (2019)	"Rebota (Remix)" (2019)	"Atrévete" (2019)

Farruko singles chronology
"No" (2019)	"Rebota (Remix)" (2019)	"Date Tu Guille" (2019)

Becky G singles chronology
"Dollar" (2019)	"Rebota (Remix)" (2019)	"Cómo No" (2019)

Sech singles chronology
"No" (2019)	"Rebota (Remix)" (2019)	"Otro Trago (Remix)" (2019)

Music video
- "Rebota (Remix)" on YouTube

On 12 July 2019 a remix version featuring vocals by Nicky Jam, Farruko, Becky G and Sech was released.

=== Charts ===
Chart (2019)	Peak position
Argentina (Argentina Hot 100)	18
Spain (PROMUSICAE)	24
US Hot Latin Songs (Billboard)	28

=== Certifications ===
Region	Certification	Certified units/sales
Spain (PROMUSICAE)	Platinum	40,000^{‡}
United States (RIAA)	Platinum (Latin)	60,000^{‡}
^{‡} Sales+streaming figures based on certification alone.
