= Latina (Reykon song) =

Single by Reykon featuring Maluma
- Released: May 31, 2019
- Length: 3:46
- Label: Warner Latina
- Lyricist(s): Alvaro Enrique Farias Cabrera; Andrés Felipe Robledo Londoño; David Muñoz; Gustavo Lopez; Jerickson Jesus Mendoza Gainza; Juan Luis Londoño Arias; Mauricio Rojas; Rodrigo Rolando Mata; Sebastian Sanchez
- Producer(s): Alvaro Enrique Farias Cabrera; Jerickson Jesus Mendoza Gainza; Rodrigo Rolando Mata; Sebastian Sanchez

Reykon singles chronology
"Domingo" (2019)	"Latina" (2019)	"Como lo Hiciste Ayer" (2019)

Maluma singles chronology
"11 PM" (2020)	"Latina" (2019)	"Instinto Natural" (2019)

Music video
- "Latina" on YouTube

"Latina" is a song recorded by Colombians singers Reykon featuring Maluma. It was released by Warner Latina on May 31, 2019. A remix version with Becky G and Tyga was released on October 9, 2020.

== Music video ==
The music video was released on May 31, 2019.

== Charts ==
Weekly chart performance for "Latina"
Chart (2019)	Peak position
Argentina (Argentina Hot 100)	72
Colombia (National-Report)	16
Mexico Airplay (Billboard)	42
Mexico Espanol Airplay (Billboard)	14
Spain (PROMUSICAE)	79
US Hot Latin Songs (Billboard)	35
US Latin Airplay (Billboard)	23
US Latin Pop Airplay (Billboard)	17
US Latin Rhythm Airplay (Billboard)	13

== Certifications ==
Certifications for "Latina"
Region	Certification	Certified units/sales
United States (RIAA)	Platinum (Latin)	60,000^{‡}
^{‡} Sales+streaming figures based on certification alone.
