= Esquinas (album) =

2023 studio album by Becky G

Studio album by Becky G
- Released: September 28, 2023
- Recorded: 2020–2023
- Studios: Just for the Record (Sun Valley, CA)
- Genres: Latin pop; regional Mexican
- Length: 41:41
- Language: Spanish
- Labels: Kemosabe; RCA
- Producers: Gabito Ballesteros; Édgar Barrera; Casta; DannyLux; Ernesto Fernández; Jesús Laija García; Mazzarri; Peso Pluma; George Prajin; Jesus Leal Reyes; Frank Rio

Becky G chronology
Esquemas (2022)	Esquinas (2023)	Encuentros (2024)

Singles from Esquinas
- 1. "Chanel" Released: March 30, 2023; 2. "La Nena" Released: June 28, 2023; 3. "2ndo Chance" Released: September 27, 2023; 4. "Por el Contrario" Released: December 13, 2023

Esquinas (English: Corners) is the third Spanish-language studio album by American singer Becky G. It was released on September 28, 2023, through Kemosabe and RCA Records.

"2ndo Chance" with Iván Cornejo, debuted at number 34 on the Hot Latin Songs. "Por el Contrario", with siblings Leonardo Aguilar and Ángela Aguilar, debuted at number 19 on Latin Digital Song Sales and debuted at number 17 in the Hot Latin Songs.

== Background and title ==
On August 25, Gomez announced the title of her upcoming third studio album being Esquinas, and that it would be coming "soon". The album is Regional Mexican, her first in the genre, as a tribute to her grandparents, who emigrated from Mexico to the United States. Explaining its title, Gomez stated:

"I have always identified as not this side or that side of the streets that raised me, but the corner where two flags, two cultures, two languages meet."

It revealed that the album has new collaborations with Iván Cornejo, DannyLux, Yahritza y su Esencia, Chiquis, Ángela Aguilar, Leonardo Aguilar, and the previously released collaborations with Gabito Ballesteros and Peso Pluma.

== Singles ==
On March 30, 2023, Gomez and Peso Pluma released their collaboration "Chanel" as the lead single from Esquinas.

On June 28, 2023, Gomez released her collaboration with Gabito Ballesteros, the song "La Nena" as the album's second single.

On September 14, 2023, Gomez released "Querido Abuelo" as the promotional single. The song is a tribute to her grandfather and her roots.

On September 27, 2023, a music video for the third single "2ndo Chance" was released on the singer's YouTube channel. The song features the singer Ivan Cornejo. The music videos contains some cameos, including all the artists that joined the singer on the album.

In December 2023, due to the success through the platform TikTok, the song "Por el Contrario", in collaboration with Ángela and Leonardo Aguilar, was released as the fourth and final single of the album. The music video was released on December 13, on the singer's official YouTube channel.

== Accolades ==
Awards and nominations for "Esquinas"
Organization	Year	Category	Result	Ref.
Premios Juventud	2024	Best Regional Mexican Album	Nominated	
Latin Grammy Awards	2024	Producer of the Year (Note: Awards and nominations Édgar Barrera has received as producer.)	Won	
Lo Nuestro Awards	2025	Album of the Year	Nominated	
Lo Nuestro Awards	2025	Album of the Year – Mexican Music	Nominated	

== Critical reception ==
Year-end lists
Publication	List	Rank	Ref.
Billboard	The 25 Best Latin Albums of 2023	—N/a	
Rolling Stone	The 100 Best Albums of 2023	16	
Rolling Stone	The 50 Best Spanish-Language Albums of 2023	12	
Variety	The 10 Best Latin Albums of 2023	8	

== Commercial performance ==
Esquinas debuted at number 109 on the US Billboard 200, including number 7 on the Top Latin Albums and number 3 on the Regional Mexican Albums charts with 11,000 album equivalent units.

== Track listing ==
Standard edition
No.	Title	Writer(s)	Producer(s)	Length
1.	"2ndo Chance" (with Iván Cornejo)	Rebbeca Marie Gomez; Édgar Barrera; Alex Luna; Héctor André Mazzarri Ramos; Luis Miguel Gómez Castaño; Manuel Lorente Freire; Francisco Ríos	Édgar Barrera; Casta; Frank Rio; Carlos Molina^{[b]}	3:52
2.	"Cries in Spanish" (with DannyLux)	Luna; Gomez; Barrera; DannyLux; Elena Rose; Ramos; Castaño	DannyLux; Casta; Barrera; Mazzarri; Molina^{[b]}	3:06
3.	"Bien Canijo"	Gomez; Barrera; Rose; Castaño	Casta; Barrera; Guillermo Medina Poblano^{[a]}; Molina^{[b]}	2:58
4.	"La Nena" (with Gabito Ballesteros)	Gomez; Barrera; Daniel Candia; Gabito Ballesteros	Barrera; Ballesteros; Simone Torres^{[b]}	2:44
5.	"Chanel" (with Peso Pluma)	Gomez; Barrera; Jesús Roberto Laija García; Hassan Laija	Barrera; García; Jesus Leal Reyes; George Prajin; Peso Pluma; Molina^{[b]}	3:21
6.	"Patras" (with Yahritza y su Esencia)	Gomez; Barrera; Luna; Rose; Ramos; Castaño; Freire	Barrera; Casta; Mazzarri; Poblano^{[a]}Molina^{[b]}	2:51
7.	"Cuidadito" (with Chiquis)	Gomez; Barrera; Jesus Omar Tarazon Medina; Juan Pablo Zazueta Acosta	Barrera; Poblano^{[a]}; Noé Montaño^{[a]}; Molina^{[b]}	2:56
8.	"Un Puño de Tierra"	Carlos Coral	Barrera; Molina^{[b]}	3:28
9.	"Los Astros"	Barrera; Kevyn Cruz; Castaño; Freire; Felix Manuel Rodriquez	Barrera; Casta; Molina^{[b]}	2:48
10.	"Por un Amor"	Gilberto Parra	Barrera; Molina^{[b]}	3:21
11.	"Por el Contrario" (with Ángela Aguilar and Leonardo Aguilar)	Gomez; Barrera; Cruz; Rose; Gomez	Barrera; Mario Alberto Romero^{[a]}; Molina^{[b]}	3:05
12.	"Cruz de Olvido"	Juan Záizar	Barrera; Romer^{[a]}; Molina^{[b]}	3:19
13.	"Querido Abuelo"	Gomez; Barrera; Acosta; Medina	Barrera; Poblano^{[a]}; Molina^{[b]}	3:52
Total length:				41:41

Notes

- ^{^[a]} signifies a miscellaneous producer.
- ^{^[b]} signifies a vocal producer.

== Personnel ==
Musicians

- Becky G – vocals
- Daniel Uribe – guitar (tracks 1, 9)
- Iván Cornejo – guitar (1)
- Casta – keyboards (2, 3, 9, 10)
- Édgar Barrera – keyboards (2), guitar (10)
- DannyLux – bass, guitar (2)
- Alex Luna – guitar (2)
- Leonardo Gama – guitar (3, 6–8, 13)
- Luis Gomez – keyboards (6)
- Catherine Ochoa – background vocals (7)
- Richard Bravo – percussion (9)

Technical

- Luis Barrera Jr. – mastering (1–3, 6–12), mixing (1–3, 6–13)
- Marcelo Rivera – mastering, mixing (4)
- Ernesto Fernández – mastering, mixing (5)
- Édgar Barrera – mastering (13), engineering (2, 6)
- Alejandro Ramirez – engineering (1–3, 6–13)
- Carlos Molina – engineering (1–3, 6–13), vocal engineering (5)
- Paulo Uribe – engineering (1–3, 6–13)
- Casta – engineering (2)
- Mazzarri – engineering (2)
- Simone Torres – engineering (4)
- Jose Lizarraga – engineering (7)
- Richard Bravo – engineering (9)
- Namln King – engineering assistance (1, 2, 6, 11)
- Josh Kay – engineering assistance (3, 7, 10, 12)
- Rubén Castro – engineering assistance (4)
- Melissa Hermosillo – engineering assistance (5)
- Michelle Núñez – engineering assistance (5)
- Andrew Castillo – engineering assistance (8, 9)
- Javier Arriagada – engineering assistance (13)

== Charts ==
Chart performance for Esquinas
Chart (2023)	Peak position
US Billboard 200	109
US Regional Mexican Albums (Billboard)	3
US Top Latin Albums (Billboard)	7

=== Year-end charts ===
Year-end chart performance for Esquinas
Chart (2023)	Position
US Top Latin Albums (Billboard)	79

== Certifications ==
Certifications for Esquinas
Region	Certification	Certified units/sales
Mexico (AMPROFON)	Platinum	140,000^{‡}
^{‡} Sales+streaming figures based on certification alone.

== Release history ==
Release history for Esquinas
Region	Date	Format(s)	Label	Ref.
Various	September 28, 2023	digital download; streaming	Kemosabe; RCA	
