= Chanel (Becky G and Peso Pluma song) =

Single by Becky G and Peso Pluma

from the album Esquinas
- Language: Spanish
- Released: March 30, 2023
- Genre: Regional Mexican; corrido tumbado
- Length: 3:21
- Label: Kemosabe; RCA
- Songwriters: Rebbeca Marie Gomez; Édgar Barrera; Jesús Roberto Laija García; Hassan Laija
- Producers: Édgar Barrera; Jesús Roberto Laija García; Jesus Iván Leal Reyes

Becky G singles chronology
"Arranca" (2023)	"Chanel" (2023)	"La Nena" (2023)

Peso Pluma singles chronology
"La Bebé" (remix) (2023)	"Chanel" (2023)	"Las Morras" (2023)

Music video
- "Chanel" on YouTube

"Chanel" is a song recorded by American singer Becky G and Mexican singer Peso Pluma. The song was written by both artists with Édgar Barrera and Jesús Roberto Laija García with production from Peso Pluma, Barrera, George Prajin, Jesús Iván Leal Reyes and Ernesto Fernández. It was released by Kemosabe and RCA Records on March 30, 2023, as the lead single from Gomez's third Spanish-language and first regional Mexican studio album, Esquinas.

The song debuted on the Billboard Hot 100 chart the week of April 29 at number 88. Lyrically, the song talks about a conversation between ex-partners, in which the man wants to return with the girl, but she refuses. The song belongs to the genre of corridos tumbados, a sub-genre of regional Mexican music.

== Background and release ==
After Gomez previously worked 4 times as a guest artist with singers of the regional Mexican genre, — in 2018 on the song "Pienso en Ti" with Joss Favela, in 2020 on the cover of "Jolene" with Chiquis Rivera, in 2022 in the remix of "Ya Acabó" by group Marca MP and in 2023 on "Te Quiero Besar" with Fuerza Regida - she and Peso Pluma recorded her first song in the genre as a lead artist. In Miami, composer Edgar Barrera was the one who gave Peso Pluma the idea of recording with her, so Barrera contacted Gomez's team and she quickly accepted.

Before the collaboration was unveiled, on March 29, 2023, Gomez posted a photo on Instagram and Facebook with the phrase from the song's lyrics in her caption, "Te llevé a Chanel" (Eng. trans: I took you to Chanel), to which Peso replied "También escogió Cartier" (Eng. trans: He also chose Cartier), and rumors about a collaboration soon began. On March 30, "Chanel" was officially announced through the reveal of the cover on social media of both singers and on Prajin Records, Peso Pluma's label, and it premiered the night of that same day.

Gomez commented in a conversation between the two artists in a live video on Instagram, that the day they wrote the song and they were in the recording studio, she felt nervous about meeting the Mexican singer and the difference in their voices, and he replied: "Me too, [I was] like 'How do you think? Becky G in the studio making a song', and when you joined the chorus, I said 'She has a voice!'"

== Music video ==
The music video was released on April 6, 2023. It was directed by Ricky Alvarez and filmed in Los Angeles.

== Live performances ==
Gomez and Peso Pluma performed the song together live for the first time at the Coachella 2023 on April 14, 2023, during Gomez's set. They performed it again at the Latin American Music Awards 2023 on April 20, 2023. Gomez and Peso Pluma performed the song together live at the Coachella 2024 on April 12, 2024, this time during Peso Pluma's set.

== Accolades ==
Awards and nominations for "Chanel"
Organization	Year	Category	Result	Ref.
ASCAP Latin Music Awards	2024	Winning Songwriters & Publishers (Note: Awards and nominations Becky G has received as songwriter.)	Won	
BMI Latin Awards	2024	Winning Songs (Note: Awards and nominations Edgar Barrera, Peso Pluma and Tito Double P has received as songwriter.)	Won	
MTV MIAW Awards	2023	Music Ship of the Year	Nominated	
Premios Juventud	2023	Best Regional Mexican Fusion	Nominated	

== Charts ==
Chart performance for "Chanel"
Chart (2023)	Peak position
Global 200 (Billboard)	46
Global Excl. US (Billboard)	57
Mexico (Billboard)	9
US Billboard Hot 100	55
US Hot Latin Songs (Billboard)	8
US Latin Airplay (Billboard)	34
US Regional Mexican Airplay (Billboard)	14

=== Year-end charts ===
Year-end chart performance for "Chanel"
Chart (2023)	Position
US Hot Latin Songs (Billboard)	26

== Certifications ==
Certifications for "Chanel"
Region	Certification	Certified units/sales
Mexico (AMPROFON)	Diamond+Gold	770,000^{‡}
United States (RIAA)	Platinum	1,000,000^{‡}
^{‡} Sales+streaming figures based on certification alone.

== Release history ==
Release dates and formats for "Chanel"
Region	Date	Format	Label	Ref.
Various	March 30, 2023	Digital download; streaming	Kemosabe; RCA	
