= Díganle =

2017 single by Leslie Grace and Becky G

Single by Leslie Grace and Becky G
- Language: Spanish
- English title: "Tell him"
- Released: September 29, 2017
- Genre: Latin pop; reggaeton; R&B
- Length: 3:17
- Label: Sony Latin
- Songwriters: Leslie Grace; Marco Masís; Frank Santofimio; Cesar Roman; Rebbeca Marie Gomez; Alejandro Montaner
- Producer: Tainy

Leslie Grace singles chronology
"Nada de Amor" (2016)	"Díganle" (2017)	"Dulce" (2017)

Becky G singles chronology
"Mayores" (2017)	"Díganle" (2017)	"Ya Es Hora" (2018)

Music video
- "Díganle" on YouTube "Díganle (Tainy Remix)" on YouTube

"Díganle" is a song by American singers Leslie Grace and Becky G. It was released by Sony Music Latin on September 29, 2017. A remix version with CNCO was released on August 17, 2018.

== Charts ==
Chart (2017–18)	Peak position
Argentina Hot 100 (Billboard)	57
Ecuador (National-Report)	53
US Hot Latin Songs (Billboard)	36
US Latin Pop Airplay (Billboard)	20
Venezuela (National-Report)	39

== Certifications ==
Region	Certification	Certified units/sales
Mexico (AMPROFON)	Gold	30,000^{‡}
United States (RIAA)	2× Platinum (Latin)	120,000^{‡}
^{‡} Sales+streaming figures based on certification alone.
