= Perdiendo la Cabeza =

2020 single by Carlos Rivera, Becky G and Pedro Capo

Single by Carlos Rivera, Becky G and Pedro Capó

from the album Crónicas de una Guerra
- English title: "Losing My Head"
- Released: January 31, 2020
- Length: 2:45
- Label: Sony Latin
- Songwriters: Andrés Torres; Mauricio Rengifo
- Producer: Carlos A. Molina

Carlos Rivera singles chronology
| "El Niño del Tambor" (2019) | "Perdiendo la Cabeza" (2020) | "Ya Pasará" (2020) |

Becky G singles chronology
| "Mala Santa" (2019) | "Perdiendo la Cabeza" (2020) | "They Ain't Ready" (2020) |

Pedro Capó singles chronology
| "Quédate" (2019) | "Perdiendo la Cabeza" (2020) | "Buena Suerte" (2020) |

Music video
- "Perdiendo la Cabeza" on YouTube

"Perdiendo la Cabeza" (Losing My Head) is a song by Mexican singer Carlos Rivera, American singer Becky G and Puerto Rican singer Pedro Capó. The song and its music video were released by Sony Music Latin on January 31, 2020, as the first single from Rivera's seventh album, Crónicas de una Guerra (2021).

== Live performances ==
Rivera, Gomez and Capó performed "Perdiendo la Cabeza" together for the first time at the Premio Lo Nuestro 2020 on February 20, 2020.

== Accolades ==
Awards and nominations for "Perdiendo la Cabeza"
| Organization | Year | Category | Result | Ref. |
|---|---|---|---|---|
| Premio Lo Nuestro | 2021 | Pop Collaboration of the Year | Nominated | |
| Premio Lo Nuestro | 2021 | Pop Song of the Year | Nominated | |
| Premios Quiero | 2020 | Best Pop Video | Nominated | |

== Charts ==
| Chart (2020) | Peak position |
|---|---|
| Argentina (Argentina Hot 100) | 39 |
| Colombia (National-Report) | 7 |
| Mexico Airplay (Billboard) | 1 |
| Mexico Espanol Airplay (Billboard) | 1 |
| Spain Airplay (PROMUSICAE) | 24 |
| Spain (PROMUSICAE) | 49 |
| US Latin Airplay (Billboard) | 42 |
| US Latin Pop Airplay (Billboard) | 16 |

== Certifications ==
| Region | Certification | Certified units/sales |
|---|---|---|
| Mexico (AMPROFON) | 4× Platinum+Gold | 270,000^{‡} |
| Spain (Promusicae) | Gold | 30,000^{‡} |
| United States (RIAA) | Platinum (Latin) | 60,000^{‡} |
^{‡} Sales+streaming figures based on certification alone.
