= Que Me Baile =

Single by ChocQuibTown and Becky G

from the album ChocQuib House
- Language: Spanish
- English title: "Dance On Me"
- Released: June 28, 2019
- Length: 3:43
- Label: Sony Latin
- Songwriters: Carlos Valencia; Yhoan Jimenez; Miguel Martinez; Gloria Martínez; Johnattan Gaviria; Felipe Arias; Kevyn Cruz Moreno; Juan Camilo Vargas; Rebbeca Gomez
- Producers: Yhoan Jimenez; Johnattan Gaviria; Los Prodigiez; Slow Mike; Juan Diego Medina Vélez; David Daza

ChocQuibTown singles chronology
"Contigo" (2018)	"Que Me Baile" (2019)	"Donde Están" (2019)

Becky G singles chronology
"Next to You" (2019)	"Que Me Baile" (2019)	"Dollar" (2019)

Music video
- "Que Me Baile" on YouTube

"Que Me Baile" is a song by Colombian hip-hop group ChocQuibTown and American singer Becky G. The song and its music video was released by Sony Music Latin on June 28, 2019, as the second single from ChocQuibTown sixth album, ChocQuib House (2020).

== Charts ==
Chart (2019)	Peak position
Colombia (National-Report)	4
Spain (PROMUSICAE)	96
