= Mala Mía =

2018 song by Maluma

Single by Maluma
- Language: Spanish
- Released: 10 August 2018
- Genre: Latin pop; reggaeton
- Length: 3:03
- Label: Sony Latin
- Songwriters: Juan Luis Londoño Arias; Édgar Barrera; Stiven Rojas; Johany Alejandro Correa; Kevin Mauricio Jiménez Londoño; Bryan Lezcano Chaverra
- Producer: Johany Alejandro Correa

Maluma singles chronology
"Clandestino" (2018)	"Mala Mía" (2018)	"Amigos con Derechos" (2018)

Music video
- "Mala Mía" on YouTube

"Mala Mía" is a song by Colombian singer Maluma. It was released by Sony Music Latin on August 10, 2018. A remix version with Becky G and Anitta was released on December 21, 2018.

== Charts ==
Chart performance for "Mala Mía"
Chart (2018)	Peak position
Argentina Hot 100 (Billboard)	11
Colombia (National-Report)	7
Mexico Airplay (Billboard)	4
Mexico Espanol Airplay (Billboard)	5
Portugal (AFP)	87
Spain (PROMUSICAE)	12
Switzerland (Schweizer Hitparade)	71
US Bubbling Under Hot 100 (Billboard)	23
US Hot Latin Songs (Billboard)	9
US Latin Airplay (Billboard)	1
US Latin Pop Airplay (Billboard)	1
US Latin Rhythm Airplay (Billboard)	1

== Certifications ==
Certifications for "Mala Mía"
Region	Certification	Certified units/sales
Brazil (Pro-Música Brasil)	2× Platinum	80,000^{‡}
Italy (FIMI)	Gold	25,000^{‡}
Mexico (AMPROFON)	Diamond	300,000^{‡}
Spain (Promusicae)	2× Platinum	80,000^{‡}
United States (RIAA)	5× Platinum (Latin)	300,000^{‡}
^{‡} Sales+streaming figures based on certification alone.
