= Viajando Por El Mundo Tour =

2026–2027 concert tour by Karol G

- Tour by Karol G
- Location: Europe; North America; South America
- Associated album: Tropicoqueta
- Start date: 24 July 2026
- End date: 24 July 2027
- Legs: 3
- No. of shows: 65

Karol G concert chronology
- Mañana Será Bonito Tour (2023–2024); Viajando Por El Mundo Tour (2026–2027)

Viajando Por El Mundo Tour (subtitled Tropitour) is the ongoing fourth concert tour by Colombian singer Karol G, in support of her fifth studio album Tropicoqueta (2025). The tour began on July 24, 2026 in Chicago, United States and is set to conclude in Milan, Italy on July 24, 2027, spanning total 65 shows across the Americas and Europe.

== Background and development ==
Following her headlining performance at Coachella 2026, Karol G announced that she would be go on her stadium world tour, which will initially include 39 dates across the Americas and Europe throughout 2026 and 2027. The news was shared at the end of her performance at the festival, with the phrase "We're going on tour" displayed on the screens.

On April 27, the first presale of tickets took place in North America and Europe, which received high demand, leading to the announcement of second dates in Barcelona, Seville, Madrid, Chicago, Santa Clara, East Rutherford, and Miami, along with two new dates in Inglewood. The following day an additional date in El Paso was announced.

The presale for the Latin American leg began on April 29, again generating a high volume of interest, leading the Colombian artist to announce extra dates on the same day the presale began and in the following days. Among these, the three extra dates in Santiago stand out, where Karol G equaled Coldplay's 2022 record as the artist with the most consecutive performances (4) at the National Stadium.

== Tour dates ==
List of 2026 concerts
Date (2026)	City	Country	Venue	Supporting act(s)	Attendance	Revenue
July 24	Chicago	United States	Soldier Field	Elena Rose	85,300 / 85,300	$18,000,000
July 25	Chicago	United States	Soldier Field	Elena Rose	85,300 / 85,300	$18,000,000
July 29	Toronto	Canada	Rogers Stadium	Becky G	—	—
August 2	Landover (Note: Labeled as Washington, D.C. in promotion material.)	United States	Northwest Stadium	Becky G	—	—
August 7	Paradise (Note: Labeled as Las Vegas in promotion material.)	United States	Allegiant Stadium	Elena Rose	45,200 / 45,200	$10,600,000
August 14	Inglewood (Note: Labeled as Los Angeles in promotion material.)	United States	SoFi Stadium	Elena Rose	139,000 / 139,000	$34,100,000
August 15	Inglewood	United States	SoFi Stadium	Becky G	139,000 / 139,000	$34,100,000
August 16	Inglewood	United States	SoFi Stadium	Greeicy	139,000 / 139,000	$34,100,000
August 21	Santa Clara (Note: Labeled as San Francisco in promotion material.)	United States	Levi's Stadium	Becky G	91,500 / 91,500	—
August 22	Santa Clara	United States	Levi's Stadium	Becky G	91,500 / 91,500	—
August 26	Seattle	United States	Lumen Field	Becky G	53,000 / 53,000	$9,800,000
August 29	Glendale (Note: Labeled as Phoenix in promotion material.)	United States	State Farm Stadium	—N/a	—	—
September 2	San Antonio	United States	Alamodome	Becky G	355,000	$73,000,000
September 5	El Paso	United States	Sun Bowl	Becky G	355,000	$73,000,000
September 6	El Paso	United States	Sun Bowl	Becky G	355,000	$73,000,000
September 12	Foxborough (Note: Labeled as Boston in promotion material.)	United States	Gillette Stadium	Elena Rose	355,000	$73,000,000
September 17	East Rutherford (Note: Labeled as New York City in promotion material.)	United States	MetLife Stadium	Elena Rose	355,000	$73,000,000
September 18	East Rutherford	United States	MetLife Stadium	Becky G	355,000	$73,000,000
September 24	Atlanta	United States	Mercedes-Benz Stadium	Elena Rose	355,000	$73,000,000
September 27	Houston	United States	Reliant Stadium	Greeicy	355,000	$73,000,000
October 2	Miami Gardens (Note: Labeled as Miami in promotion material.)	United States	Hard Rock Stadium	Elena Rose	—	—
October 3	Miami Gardens	United States	Hard Rock Stadium	Greeicy	—	—
October 9	Tampa	United States	Raymond James Stadium	Elena Rose	—	—
October 15	Arlington (Note: Labeled as Dallas in promotion material.)	United States	AT&T Stadium	Elena Rose	—	—
November 6	Guadalupe (Note: Labeled as Monterrey in promotion material.)	Mexico	Estadio BBVA	Becky G	—	—
November 7	Guadalupe	Mexico	Estadio BBVA	Becky G	—	—
November 8	Guadalupe	Mexico	Estadio BBVA	Becky G	—	—
November 13	Mexico City	Mexico	Estadio GNP Seguros	Thalía	—	—
November 14	Mexico City	Mexico	Estadio GNP Seguros	Belinda	—	—
November 17	Mexico City	Mexico	Estadio GNP Seguros	Paulina Rubio	—	—
November 27	San José	Costa Rica	Estadio Nacional	—N/a	—	—
November 28	San José	Costa Rica	Estadio Nacional	—N/a	—	—
December 4	Bogotá	Colombia	Estadio El Campín	—N/a	—	—
December 5	Bogotá	Colombia	Estadio El Campín	—N/a	—	—
December 6	Bogotá	Colombia	Estadio El Campín	—N/a	—	—

List of 2027 concerts
Date (2027)	City	Country	Venue	Attendance	Gross
January 15	Quito	Ecuador	Atahualpa Olympic Stadium	—	—
January 16	Quito	Ecuador	Atahualpa Olympic Stadium	—	—
January 17	Quito	Ecuador	Atahualpa Olympic Stadium	—	—
January 22	Lima	Peru	Estadio Universidad San Marcos	—	—
January 28	Santiago	Chile	Julio Martínez Prádanos National Stadium	—	—
January 29	Santiago	Chile	Julio Martínez Prádanos National Stadium	—	—
January 30	Santiago	Chile	Julio Martínez Prádanos National Stadium	—	—
January 31	Santiago	Chile	Julio Martínez Prádanos National Stadium	—	—
February 5	Buenos Aires	Argentina	River Plate Stadium	—	—
February 12	São Paulo	Brazil	Pacaembu Stadium	—	—
February 19	Santo Domingo	Dominican Republic	Estadio Olímpico Félix Sánchez	—	—
February 26	San Juan	Puerto Rico	Hiram Bithorn Stadium	—	—
June 3	Barcelona	Spain	Estadi Olímpic Lluís Companys	—	—
June 4	Barcelona	Spain	Estadi Olímpic Lluís Companys	—	—
June 12	Seville	Spain	Estadio de La Cartuja	—	—
June 13	Seville	Spain	Estadio de La Cartuja	—	—
June 24	Madrid	Spain	Riyadh Air Metropolitano Stadium	—	—
June 25	Madrid	Spain	Riyadh Air Metropolitano Stadium	—	—
June 26	Madrid	Spain	Riyadh Air Metropolitano Stadium	—	—
June 27	Madrid	Spain	Riyadh Air Metropolitano Stadium	—	—
July 1	Nanterre (Note: Labeled as Paris in promotion material.)	France	Plenitude Arena	—	—
July 6	London	England	Tottenham Hotspur Stadium	—	—
July 10	Amsterdam	Netherlands	Johan Cruyff Arena	—	—
July 17	Düsseldorf	Germany	Merkur Spiel-Arena	—	—
July 24	Milan	Italy	San Siro	—	—

== Cancelled shows ==
List of cancelled concerts, showing date, city, country, venue, and reason for cancellation
Date	City	Country	Venue	Reason
July 14, 2027	Warsaw	Poland	PGE Narodowy	Unknown
