= No Drama (Becky G and Ozuna song) =

Single by Becky G and Ozuna

Single by Becky G and Ozuna
- Language: Spanish
- Released: October 29, 2020
- Studio: Criteria Studios (Miami, FL)
- Genre: Reggaeton
- Length: 3:46
- Label: Kemosabe
- Songwriters: Rebbeca Gomez; Juan Carlos Ozuna; Hector Ramos Carbia; Elof Loelv; Evan Bogart; Elena Rose; Benjamin Rice; Juan Manuel Frias "Brasa"; Luian Malavé Nieves; Edgar Semper; Xavier Semper; Rafael Salcedo; Kedin Maysonet
- Producers: Elof Loelv; Benjamin Rice

Becky G singles chronology
"Mala (Remix)" (2020)	"No Drama" (2020)	"Qué Maldición (Remix)" (2020)

Ozuna singles chronology
"Del Mar" (2020)	"No Drama" (2020)	"No Me Acostumbro" (2020)

Alternative cover
- Cumbia solo version cover art

Music video
- "No Drama" on YouTube "No Drama (Cumbia Version (Audio))" on YouTube

"No Drama" is a song by American singer Becky G and Puerto Rican singer Ozuna. It was released by Kemosabe Records on October 29, 2020.

== Music video ==
The music video was released alongside the song on October 29. The music video was directed by Mike Ho. It features the singers in a dark, natural setting.

== Remix ==
On March 18, 2021, a cumbia version of the song without Ozuna was released. A new music video was filmed, but was only made available on the social media site Facebook. The song's audio was uploaded to Youtube.

== Charts ==
Weekly chart performance for "No Drama"
Chart (2020)	Peak position
Argentina Hot 100 (Billboard)	65
Puerto Rico (Monitor Latino)	3
Spain (PROMUSICAE)	48
Switzerland (Schweizer Hitparade)	88
US Hot Latin Songs (Billboard)	23
US Latin Airplay (Billboard)	22
US Latin Rhythm Airplay (Billboard)	10

=== Year-end charts ===
Chart (2021)	Position
US Latin Rhythm Airplay (Billboard)	50
