= Querido Abuelo =

2023 single by Becky G

Promotional single by Becky G

from the album Esquinas
- Language: Spanish
- English title: "Dear Grandfather"
- Released: September 14, 2023
- Length: 3:52
- Label: Kemosabe; RCA
- Songwriter(s): Rebecca Marie Gomez; Édgar Barrera; Juan Pablo Zazueta Acosta; Jesus Omar Tarazon Medina
- Producer(s): Édgar Barrera

Becky G singles chronology
"Coming Your Way" (2023)	"Querido Abuelo" (2023)	"2ndo Chance" (2023)

Music video
- "Querido Abuelo" on YouTube

"Querido Abuelo" is a song by American singer Becky G. It was released by Kemosabe and RCA Records on September 14, 2023, as the promotional single from Becky G's album, Esquinas (2023). The single is dedicated to her grandfather who died.

== Composition ==
Gomez sings about the moments she shared with her grandfather.

== Live performances ==
Gomez performed the song at the Premio Lo Nuestro 2025 on February 20, 2025.

== Music video ==
The music video was released alongside the single. It was directed by Becky G and Elias Lopez. The music video for the song delves into nostalgia, as the singer has used family archive footage where we see her as a child with her grandparents.

== Release history ==
Release dates and formats for "Querido Abuelo"
Region	Date	Format(s)	Label(s)	Ref.
Various	September 14, 2023	Digital download; streaming	Kemosabe; RCA; Sony Latin	
