= Simone Torres (music producer) =

American vocal producer, engineer and artist

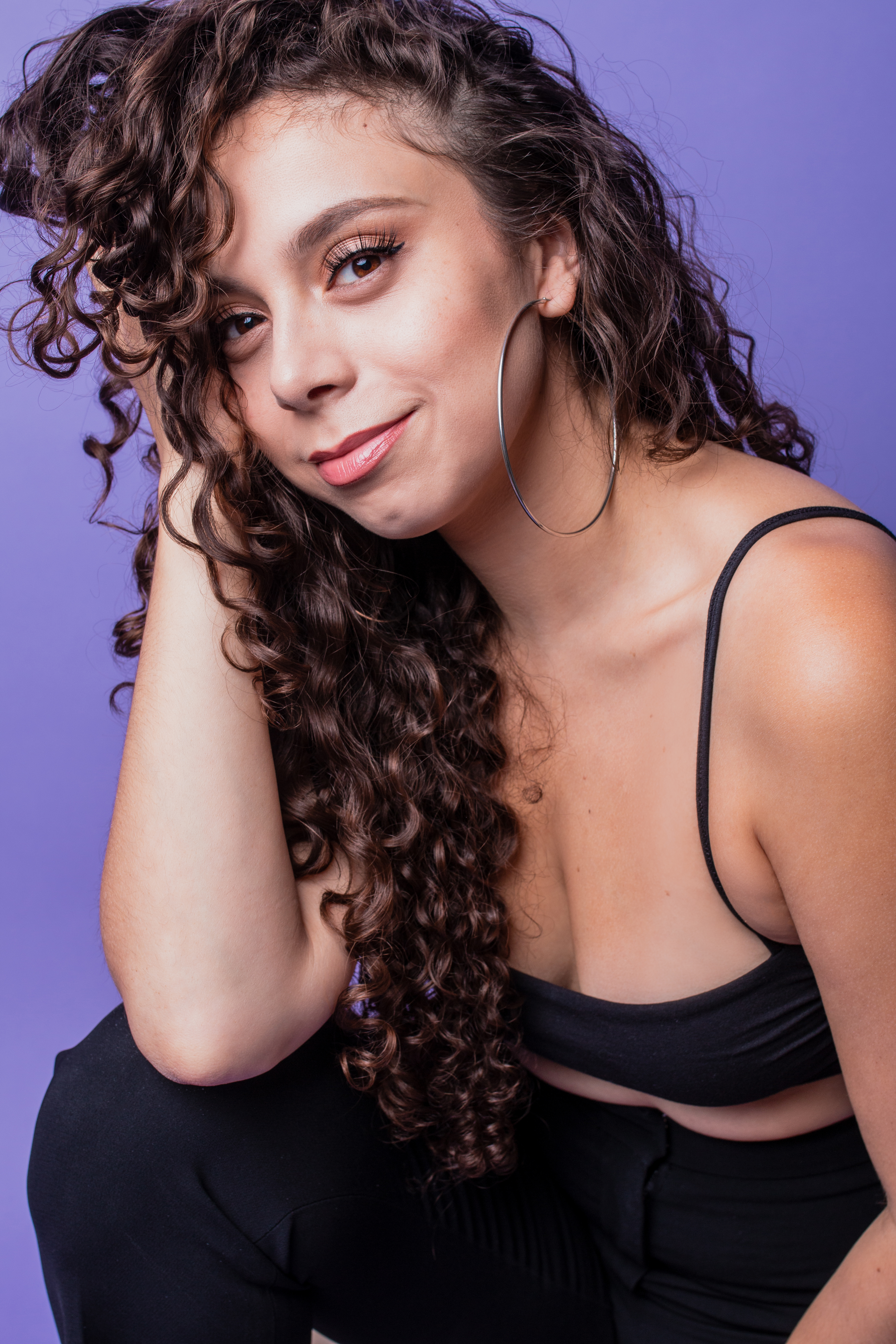

Background information
- Born: Long Island, New York, U.S.
- Genres: Pop
- Occupations: Vocal producer, engineer, artist
- Years active: 2013–present

Simone Torres is an American vocal producer, engineer and artist. She was honored by The Latin Recording Academy as one of the Leading Ladies of Entertainment in 2023.

== Career ==
Torres graduated from Berklee College of Music in 2015. In 2013, she took part in third season of the American music competition series The X Factor.

== Selected discography ==
Year	Title	Artist	Vocal-Producer	Engineer	Backing vocalist
2023	Black Mona Lisa	Billy Porter	✓	✓	✓
2023	La Nena	Becky G	✓	✓	
2023	Cough	Becky G	✓	✓	
2023	Coming Your Way	Becky G	✓	✓	✓
2023	Golden Child	Paravi	✓	✓	✓
2023	Angry	Paravi	✓	✓	✓
2023	"Mantrum"	Boys World	✓	✓	✓
2023	"Grease Is The Word"	The Cast of Grease: Rise of the Pink Ladies	✓	✓	✓
2023	"Merely Players"	Ari Notartomaso, Niamh Wilson, The Cast of Grease: Rise of the Pink Ladies	✓	✓	✓
2023	"Pulling Strings"	Jason Schmidt, The Cast of Grease: Rise of the Pink Ladies	✓	✓	✓
2023	"In Pieces"	Chlöe		✓	
2022	"Come Back Home" (Stripped)	Sofia Carson (For Purple Hearts)	✓	✓	
2022	"Feel It Still"	Sofia Carson (For Purple Hearts)	✓	✓	
2022	"Sweet Caroline"	Sofia Carson (For Purple Hearts)	✓	✓	
2022	"Universal Love"	The Game (featuring Chris Brown, Chlöe and Cassie)		✓	
2022	"People"	Libianca (featuring Becky G)	✓	✓	✓
2022	"Bloody Samaritan"	Kelly Rowland		✓	
2021	"Finally (Cannot Hide It)"	Kelly Rowland		✓	
2021	"Wonderful Time"	Kelly Rowland		✓	
2021	"Children"	Billy Porter	✓	✓	✓
2021	"Ain't About You"	Wonho		✓	
2021	"Cheap Red Wine"	AJ Mitchell	✓	✓	✓
2021	"Miss You"	AJ Mitchell	✓	✓	✓
2021	"Rewind"	Nnena (songwriter Simone Torres)	✓	✓	
2021	"Faking Love"	Anitta		✓	
2021	"Love You"	Anitta		✓	
2020	"Me Gusta"	Anitta (featuring Cardi B and Myke Towers)		✓	
2020	"Jesus What A Wonderful Child"	Stevie Mackey	✓	✓	
2020	"Somwhere In My Memory"	Stevie Mackey	✓	✓	
2020	"It's The Most Wonderful Time of the Year"	Stevie Mackey	✓	✓	✓
2020	"Someone's Someone"	Monsta X		✓	
2019	"Motivation"	Normani	✓	✓	
2019	"Bad to You"	Normani		✓	
2019	"15 Minutes"	Marc E. Bassy	✓	✓	
2019	"Bounce Back"	Little Mix		✓	
2019	"South of the Border"	Ed Sheeran (featuring Camila Cabello and Cardi B)		✓	
2018	"I Like It"	Cardi B		✓	
2018	"Be Careful"	Cardi B		✓	
2018	"Best Life"	Cardi B		✓	
2018	"Writing on the Wall"	Cardi B		✓	
2018	"Consequences"	Camila Cabello		✓	
2018	"Something's Gotta Give"	Camila Cabello		✓	
2018	"In the Dark"	Camila Cabello		✓	
2018	"Never Be the Same"	Camila Cabello (featuring Kane Brown)		✓	
2018	"Chances"	Backstreet Boys		✓	
2018	"One Chance to Dance"	Naughty Boy (featuring Joe Jonas)		✓	
2018	"R.O.S.E."	Jessie J		✓	
2017	"My Love"	Dua Lipa	✓	✓	
2017	"Lonely"	Demi Lovato		✓	

== Awards and nominations ==
Year	Result	Award	Category	Work	Ref.
2019	Nominated	Grammy Awards	Record of the Year	I Like It	
