= La Nena (song) =

Single by Becky G and Gabito Ballesteros

from the album Esquinas
- Language: Spanish
- English title: "The Girl"
- Released: June 28, 2023
- Studio: Just for the Record (Sun Valley, CA)
- Genre: Regional Mexican
- Length: 2:44
- Label: Kemosabe; RCA
- Songwriters: Rebbeca Marie Gomez; Édgar Barrera; Daniel Candia
- Producers: Édgar Barrera; Simone Torres

Becky G singles chronology
"Chanel" (2023)	"La Nena" (2023)	"Cough (Remix)" (2023)

Gabito Ballesteros singles chronology
"La Mamoncita del Insta" (2023)	"La Nena" (2023)	"Lady Gaga" (2023)

Music video
- "La Nena" on YouTube

"La Nena" is a song by American singer Becky G and Mexican singer Gabito Ballesteros. It was released by Kemosabe and RCA Records on June 28, 2023, as the second single from Gomez's third Spanish-language and first regional Mexican studio album, Esquinas.

== Composition ==
The song narrates the aftermath of a breakup. In the corrido tumbado, the artists sing about a girl who wants to forget about an ex-lover who didn't know how to value her and cheated on her. Gomez and Ballesteros describe "La Nena" as someone who is now glowing, even though her heart's crying, saying that she's "mejor sola que mal acompañada" (Eng. trans.: better alone than with bad company), a message also seen in Gomez's 2016 single "Sola", though it's unclear if she's speaking about her own experiences.

== Music video ==
The music video was released alongside the single. It was directed by Santiago Lafee and creatively directed by Gomez and Daniela Matos. It follows Gomez entering a strip club as she's greeted by Ballesteros. They both take seats and watch women do pole dancing. They are taken to the podium where Ballesteros lays down and Gomez sits in a chair, both receiving lap-dances. The scenes are split with the singers singing separately in a room surrounded by mirrors, as well as in an empty cabaret as the camera goes in circles around them. During the video, Gomez wears a jacket and a choker necklace that both read "LA NENA", possibly meaning that the song tells the story of her own relationship.

== Release history ==
Release dates and formats for "La Nena"
Region	Date	Format(s)	Label(s)	Ref.
Various	June 28, 2023	Digital download; streaming	Kemosabe; RCA	
