= Becky G =

American singer (born 1997)

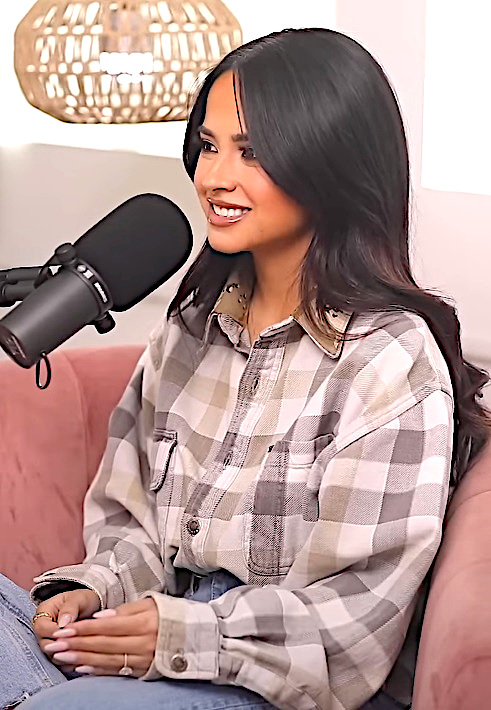
- Becky G in 2023
- Born: Rebbeca Marie Gomez; March 2, 1997 (age 29); Inglewood, California, U.S.
- Other name: Becky Gomez
- Occupations: Singer; actress
- Years active: 2008–present
- Works: Discography; songs; performances; videography
- Awards: Full list
- Musical career
- Genres: Pop; hip-hop; latin
- Instruments: Vocals
- Labels: Kemosabe; RCA; Sony Latin
- Website: iambeckyg.com

Signature
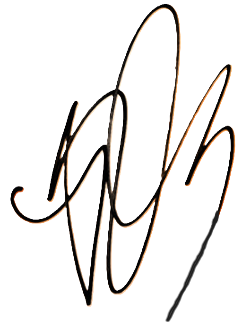

Rebbeca Marie Gomez (born March 2, 1997), known professionally as Becky G, is an American singer. She first gained recognition in 2011 for her cover versions of popular songs, which she uploaded to YouTube. Her debut single "Becky from the Block" and her debut EP, Play It Again, were released in 2013, although both failed to chart. In 2014, Gomez achieved mainstream success with the release of "Shower", which reached the top twenty on the US Billboard Hot 100. In 2016, she released her first full Spanish-language single, "Sola", as her debut into the Latin music market.

Gomez's debut studio album, Mala Santa (2019), debuted in the top five on the Billboard Top Latin Albums chart. Its first two singles, "Mayores" and "Sin Pijama", peaked within the top five on the Hot Latin Songs chart, while the third single, "Cuando Te Besé", topped the Argentina Hot 100. Her second studio album, Esquemas (2022), produced the Hot Latin Songs number-one single "Mamiii". Her third and fourth efforts, the regional Mexican albums, Esquinas (2023) and Encuentros (2024), produced the Regional Mexican Airplay number-one singles "Por el Contrario" and "Mercedes". She released her fifth studio album, Baraja Bendita in 2026.

Aside from music, Gomez has ventured into acting, appearing in films such as Power Rangers (2017), A.X.L. (2018), and Blue Beetle (2023), and guest starring in the television series Austin & Ally and Empire. A documentary film titled Rebbeca, focused on her personal life and the creation of Esquinas, was released in 2025.

Gomez has received various accolades, including three American Music Awards, a Billboard Latin Music Award, nine Latin American Music Awards, five Lo Nuestro Awards, three People's Choice Awards, and seven Premios Juventud. She founded the cosmetic company Treslúce Beauty (2021–2024). She was named on Forbes 30 Under 30 (2023) and Time 100 (2025), and has received various honors, including Billboard's Impact Award (2023) and Global Impact Award (2026). Outside of music and acting, Gomez advocates for immigrant rights, gender equality, mental health and the empowerment of the Latino community.

== Life and career ==
=== 1997–2011: Early life and career beginnings ===
Rebbeca Marie Gomez was born on March 2, 1997, in Inglewood, California, the oldest of four children, to American parents of Mexican descent, Francisco "Frank" Gómez and Alejandra "Alex" Esquivias. All four of her grandparents are from Jalisco, Mexico, while her parents and most of her family were born in the United States. Gomez has two younger brothers, Frankie and Alex, and a younger sister, Stephanie. In December 2018, she revealed that she has a younger half-sister, Amber, from her father's side. Gomez grew up in Moreno Valley, and, at the age of nine, her family lost their home and moved into the converted garage of her grandparents' house due to financial problems. Gomez began working part-time jobs to help support her family, doing commercials and voice over work. She had what she described as a "mid-life crisis" when she was nine years old, and decided she wanted to pursue a music career. She was quoted as stating:

That was literally my mid-life crisis when I was nine years old. That's when I felt like, 'OK, I gotta get my life together. What am I gonna do?' I pushed that on myself at a younger age than the average kid because at the time my family had lost our home. I've always been more mature for my age, so I was already understanding what they were going through. And I just thought, 'How can I help them?'

Gomez initially attended public school, though had to undergo home schooling due to issues with bullying. She claimed that at one point she was jumped by multiple girls while in the restroom, and was a frequent target due to her jobs in the entertainment industry.

In 2008, Gomez appeared in the short film El Tux as Claudia Gómez and as Nina in the Discovery Channel television film La estación de la Calle Olvera. That same year, she was a member of the children's music group Kidz Bop on their fourteenth album. She became a member of a girl group named G.L.A.M. in 2009, and later joined B.C.G., a duo with G.L.A.M. member Cristal G. She filmed a music video as part of G.L.A.M. for a song titled "JellyBean" in 2009. During this time, Gomez also began recording herself singing and rapping songs using GarageBand, and created a YouTube account to post covers of popular songs online. She began writing her own songs, and by the age of thirteen had taught herself how to play guitar and befriended production duo The Jam, who liked her written work. The trio began working on material together, uploading cover versions of popular songs "Otis", "Lighters", "Novacane", "Take Care", "Boyfriend" and "Turn the Music Up", which samples "Mi Tierra". These songs were meant to be part of a mixtape, titled @itsbeckygomez, though this project never came to fruition.

After catching the attention of producer Dr. Luke, with her cover of "Otis" in 2011, Gomez signed with Kemosabe Records in a joint venture with RCA Records, the Sony Music Entertainment imprint founded by Luke.

=== 2012–2015: Commercial success with music and acting ===
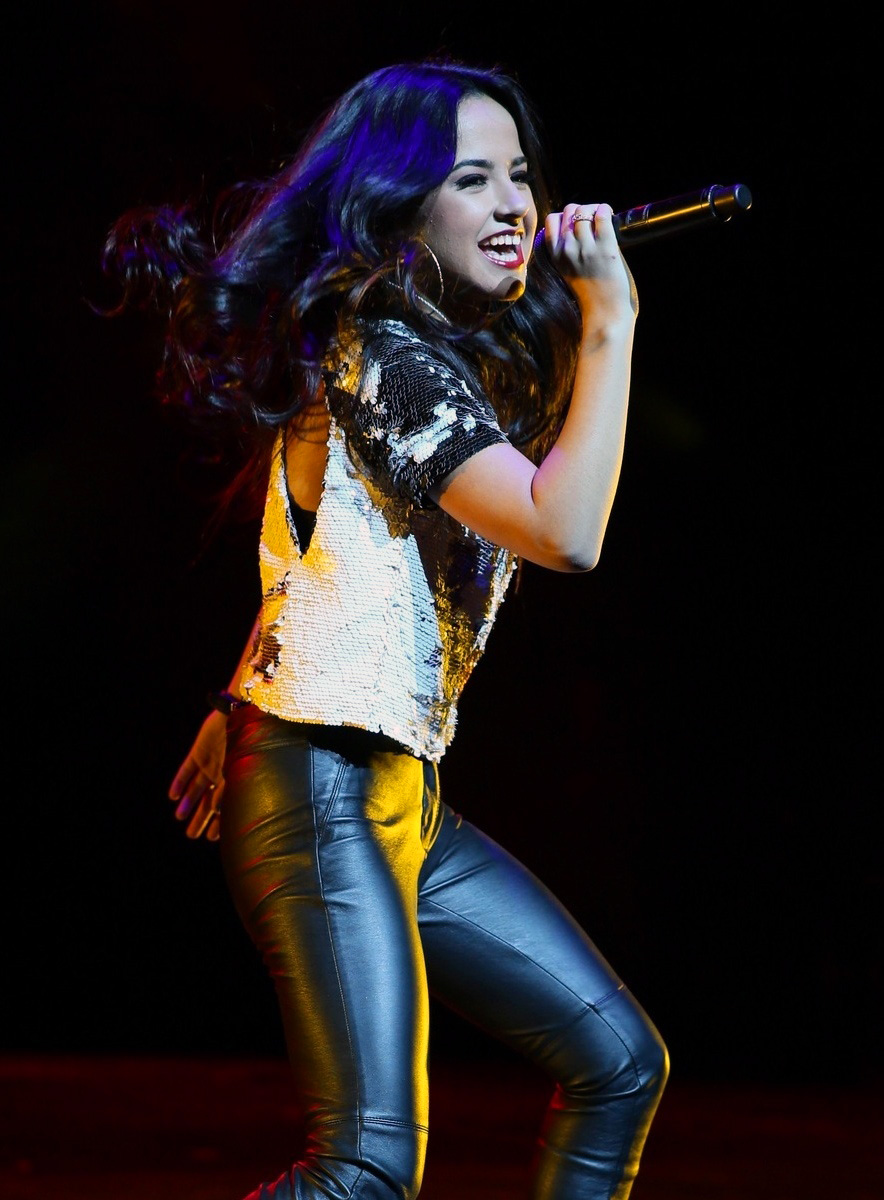
Gomez performing in 2013

On August 7, 2012, Gomez featured on the Australian singer Cody Simpson's single "Wish U Were Here", from his debut album, Paradise. On September 6, she released a lyric video on YouTube for the song "Problem", featuring the American rapper will.i.am of the Black Eyed Peas. Following a request from Sony Pictures, the song was re-released with the subtitle "(The Monster Remix)" for the animated film Hotel Transylvania, serving as a promotional single and appearing in the movie's end credits. Its music video was released on September 13. On October 2, she featured on the single "Oath" by the English singer Cher Lloyd. The song was originally written by Gomez, but was brought to Lloyd and released as the second single from the North American version of her debut album, Sticks + Stones. It gained Gomez her first entries on the US Billboard Hot 100 and the Canadian Hot 100, peaking at numbers 73 and 58, respectively. She also featured on a remix of the song "Ai Se Eu Te Pego", a cover by the Brazilian singer Michel Teló, released on his UK EP on October 14. She later featured on a remix of the single "Die Young" by the American singer Kesha and the rappers Juicy J and Wiz Khalifa, which was included on the Japanese deluxe edition of Kesha's second album, Warrior.

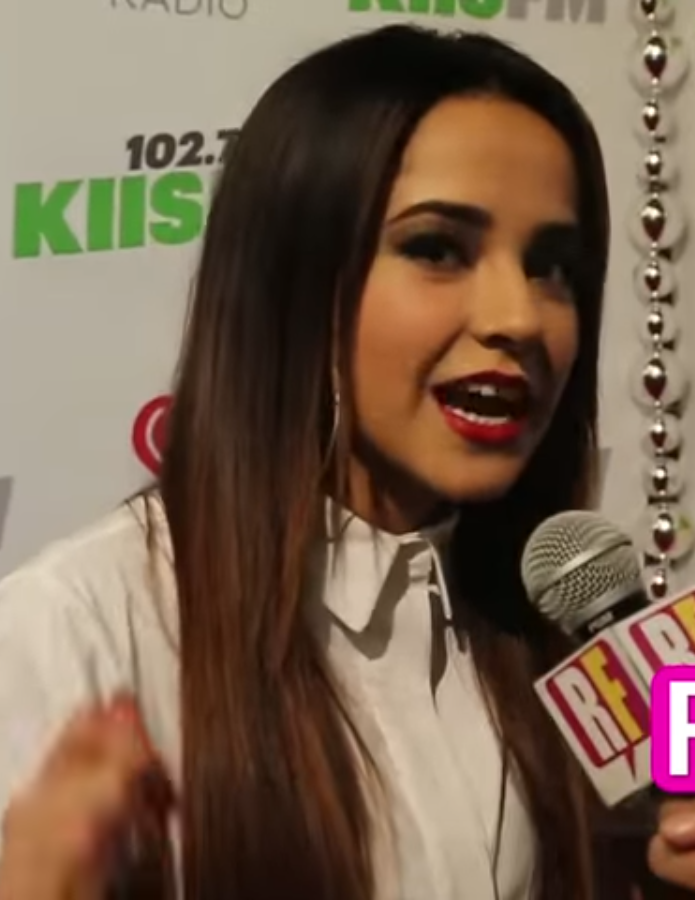
Gomez in 2014

On April 8, 2013, Gomez released her debut single "Becky from the Block". The song is a cover of Jennifer Lopez's 2003 single "Jenny from the Block". Gomez filmed a music video in her neighborhood, with Lopez herself making a cameo in the clip. Entertainment Tonight described the version to have "give[n] Jenny's NY-based tune a West Coast slant". She released the promotional single, "Play It Again", on May 6, alongside a music video, also filmed in and around her neighborhood. Gomez released her debut EP titled Play It Again on July 13. A Spanglish version of the title track, subtitled "(Una Y Otra Vez)" was released on August 9, with the chorus and bridge sung in Spanish. Gomez performed this version at the 2013 Premios Juventud. She released the second promotional single "Built for This" on November 6, alongside a self-directed music video posted on her YouTube channel. On September 24, she featured on Mexican DJ trio 3Ball MTY's single "Quiero Bailar (All Through the Night)", which sees Gomez rapping and singing in both English and Spanish. In October, she confirmed that she was already recording her debut album.

The EP's official lead single "Can't Get Enough", featuring Cuban-American rapper Pitbull, was released on March 29, 2014. A Spanish version was released to digital platforms on May 1. The Spanish version reached the top ten on the Billboard Hot Latin Songs and topped the Latin Airplay. On April 23, Gomez released the single "Shower". It reached the top twenty in the US, and Australia, while peaking at number thirty-eight in Canada and at number eighty in the UK. The song was planned to be the lead single from her then-upcoming English debut album. Gomez opened for American singers Demi Lovato and Katy Perry on select dates of their Demi and Prismatic world tours (2014–15) in both the United States and Mexico. On November 4, Gomez released the single "Can't Stop Dancin'", which peaked at number 88 in the US. On the same day, Gomez featured on the track "Como Tú No Hay Dos" from Mexican singer Thalía's fourteenth album, Amore Mio. The song was released as a single on January 20, 2015, alongside its music video. She released a remix of "Can't Stop Dancin'" with Colombian singer J Balvin on March 3.

On April 1, Gomez released the single "Lovin' So Hard", along with a music video consisting of homemade footage of her and Austin Mahone, whom she briefly dated. She performed at a tribute concert for the late Mexican-American singer Jenni Rivera. Gomez appeared as Valentina Galindo in two episodes of the musical drama series Empire; she also performed two songs for the show's soundtrack, titled "Do It" and "New New". Gomez received a nomination for Choice TV: Scene Stealer at the 2016 Teen Choice Awards. On August 21, she released the single "Break a Sweat". J Balvin and Gomez embarked on co-headlining tour, the La Familia Tour in September 2015, which spanned across the United States. She later collaborated with Dutch DJs Yellow Claw on the songs "Wild Mustang" and "For the Thrill", from their album Blood for Mercy. Gomez released the promotional single "You Love It" on October 30. That same day, she was cast as Trini Kwan, the Yellow Ranger, in the film Power Rangers.

=== 2016–2018: Crossover to Latin music and films ===
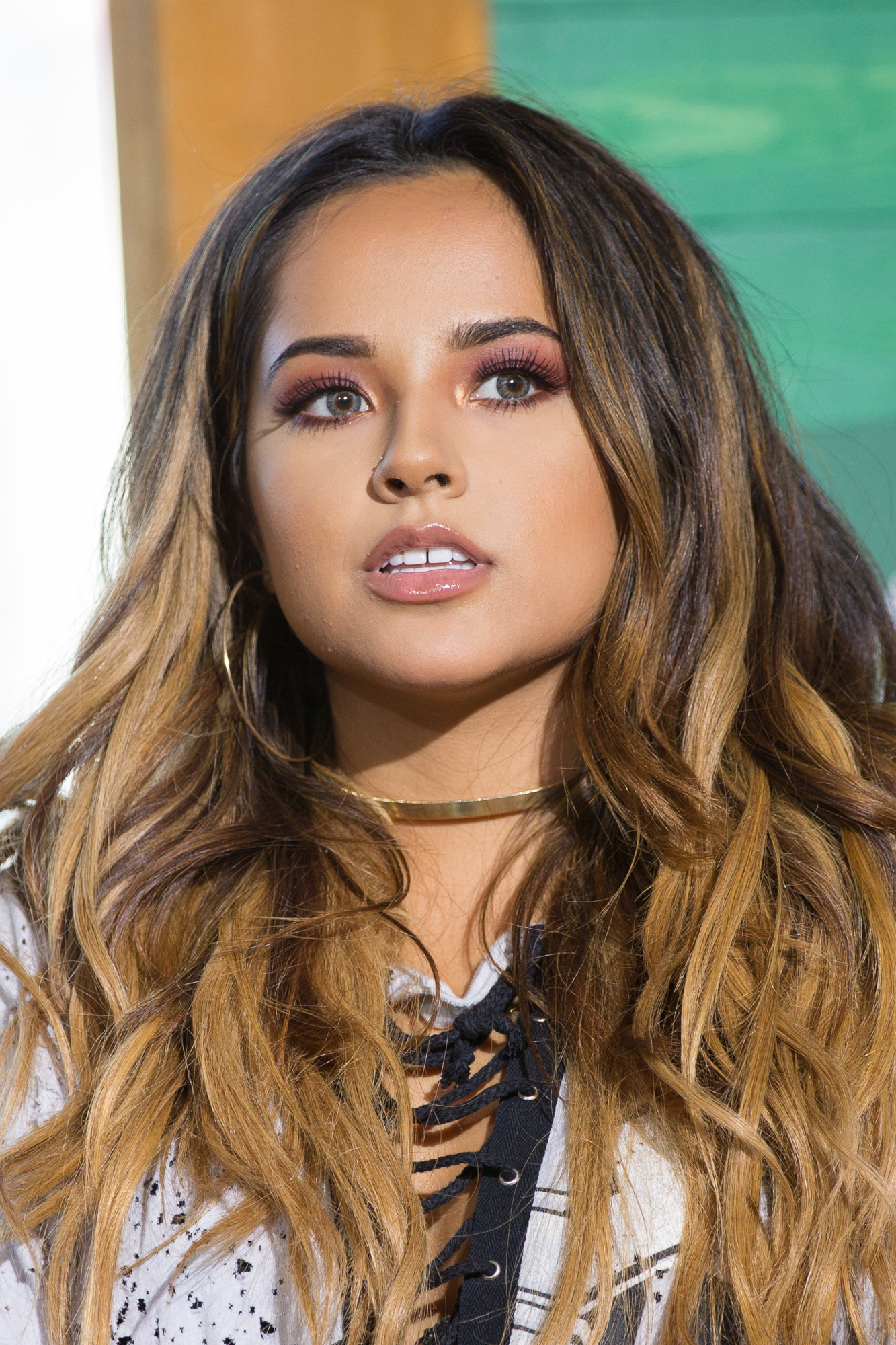
Gomez in 2016

Gomez again collaborated with Pitbull on the song "Superstar", released in May 2016. It served as the official anthem for the Copa América Centenario, and they both performed the song at the game. On June 24, Gomez released her first full Spanish-language single "Sola", as her debut into the Latin music market. It reached the top twenty on the Hot Latin Songs chart. The song was planned to be the lead single from her then-upcoming Spanish debut studio album, which was later shelved. On July 22, she was featured alongside Puerto Rican singer Yandel on American rapper Lil Jon's single "Take It Off", with its Spanglish version being released the same day. The single peaked at number forty-five on the Hot Latin Songs chart. On October 7, Gomez released her follow-up single "Mangú". She performed the song at the Latin American Music Awards 2016, hours before its release. The single peaked at number forty-seven on the Hot Latin Songs.

Gomez was featured on American producers Play-N-Skillz's both Spanglish and English cover versions of the 1994 song "Si Una Vez " by late Tejano singer Selena, alongside American singer Frankie J and rapper Kap G. The singles were released on February 24 and April 7, 2017, respectively. On March 3, Gomez released "Todo Cambió", intended to be the third single from her debut album. The song peaked at number thirty-three on the Hot Latin Songs chart. She released two remixes: the first featuring boy band CNCO and the second with American singer Justin Quiles.

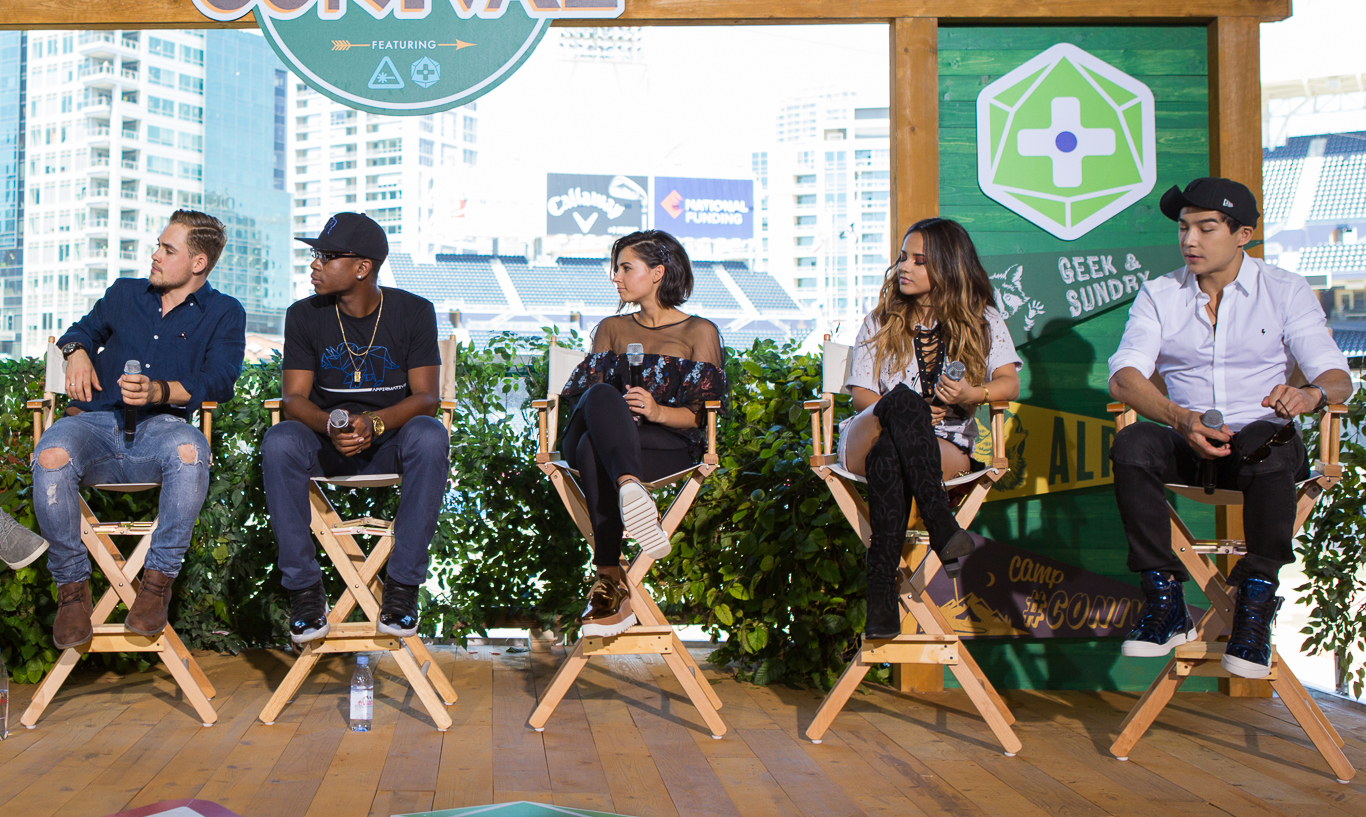
Gomez with her co-stars of Power Rangers

Power Rangers received its world premiere in Berlin, Germany, on March 17, 2017 and the film was theatrically released on March 24. The film received mixed reviews and was a box-office disappointment. Gomez received public attention after it was revealed that her character, Trini, is queer, being the first film superhero to be from the LGBTQ community. She received a nomination for Choice Movie Actress – Sci-Fi/Fantasy at the Teen Choice Awards. She was featured on Argentine singer Axel's single "Que Nos Animemos", released on June 30. On July 14, Gomez released the single "Mayores", with Bad Bunny, alongside its music video. It was meant to be the lead single from a new Spanish album, which was also shelved, and instead was included on her future debut album released in 2019. "Mayores" was a commercial success, topping the charts in eleven countries, including Mexico and Spain, while peaking at number three on the Hot Latin Songs chart, while its music video has accumulated over 2.5 billion views. On September 8, Gomez featured on "Todo Lo Que Quiero" by Yandel, released as a promotional single from his album #Update. On September 29, Gomez joined Dominican-American singer and long-time friend Leslie Grace on the single "Díganle", which was remixed a year later with vocals from CNCO. The remix peaked at number thirty-six on the Hot Latin Songs chart. On October 5, she featured as the vocalist on the song "Christmas C'mon", by American violinist Lindsey Stirling from her Christmas album, Warmer in the Winter. Later that month, Gomez and Mexican actor Diego Boneta hosted the Latin American Music Awards of 2017. She voiced Chloe in the animated fantasy comedy film Gnome Alone, starring alongside Josh Peck. The film was released on November 2, in Greece and Cyprus and was later released on Netflix on October 19, 2018 in the US. The film received mixed reviews.

On February 13, 2018, Venezuelan duo Mau y Ricky and Colombian singer Karol G released a remix of their song "Mi Mala" featuring Gomez, Grace and Argentine singer Lali. The single peaked at number thirty-eight on the Hot Latin Songs chart. On the 16th, Gomez was featured on the single "Mad Love" by Jamaican rapper Sean Paul and French DJ and producer David Guetta. The song was co-written by and originally featured Colombian singer-songwriter Shakira. The single peaked at number seventy-one in Canada, and at number twenty-two in the UK. On March 16, Spanish singer Ana Mena, Gomez and American singer De la Ghetto released the single "Ya Es Hora". On April 20, Gomez released the single "Sin Pijama", with Dominican singer Natti Natasha. They were both featured on the remix of Puerto Rican rapper Daddy Yankee's single "Dura" alongside Bad Bunny. In June, Mau y Ricky and Gomez released the promotional single "Mal de la Cabeza" from duo's debut album, Para Aventuras y Curiosidades. In July, Gomez returned to English music with "Zooted" featuring Moroccan-American rapper French Montana and Puerto Rican singer Farruko. The song's music video features a cameo appearance from her Power Rangers co-start RJ Cyler.

Gomez starred in the science fiction adventure film A.X.L., alongside Alex Neustaedter. The film received largely negative reviews from critics, with criticisms aimed at its derivative nature. On October 19, Gomez collaborated with Mexican singer Joss Favela on the single "Pienso en Ti", which was her first song in the regional Mexican genre. Spanish rapper C. Tangana released the single "Booty" with Gomez that same month. Later that month, Gomez alongside Mexican singer Gloria Trevi, Leslie Grace, Puerto Rican actress Roselyn Sánchez and Mexican actress Aracely Arámbula hosted the Latin American Music Awards 2018. In November, Gomez was featured on Puerto Rican producers DJ Luian and Mambo Kingz's single "Bubalú" alongside Puerto Rican rapper Anuel AA and American singer Prince Royce, and also featured on the song "Lost in the Middle of Nowhere" from American singer Kane Brown's second album, Experiment. A Spanish version of the song was released in March 2019, which peaked at number thirteen on the Hot Latin Songs. In December, Gomez and Brazilian singer Anitta were featured on the remix of Colombian singer Maluma's single "Mala Mía".

=== 2019–2020: Mala Santa ===
In January 2019, Gomez returned to English music with standalone single "LBD". She performed at the Viña del Mar International Song Festival, during the festival she was the recipient of the Silver and Golden Seagull awards. In March, she released the standalone single "Green Light Go". Gomez embarked on her self-titled tour, visiting Spanish-speaking countries. Gomez was featured on Anitta's single "Banana". In April, Gomez and Maluma released the standalone single "La Respuesta", which peaked at number thirteen on the Hot Latin Songs. In the same month, Gomez and British DJ Digital Farm Animals released the standalone single "Next to You" featuring Jamaican producer Rvssian. In May, English singer Zayn Malik and Gomez released a bilingual English and Spanish version of "Un Mundo Ideal", as part of the soundtrack for the live-action film Aladdin. In June, Colombian group ChocQuibTown and Gomez released the single "Que Me Baile". In July, Puerto Rican rapper Guaynaa alongside American singer Nicky Jam and Farruko released the remix of "Rebota" featuring Gomez and Panamanian singer Sech, which peaked at number twenty eight on the Hot Latin Songs. Gomez released the standalone single "Secrets" in September. In the same month, Gomez was featured on Senegalese-American singer Akon's single "Cómo No", and also featured on the remix of American rapper Saweetie's single "My Type" alongside Dominican rapper Meliii, and collaborated with Pitbull on the song "Mala", and the song was released as a single in July 2020 with De la Ghetto. She featured on South Korean rapper J-Hope's single "Chicken Noodle Soup". The song contains lyrics in Spanish, English and Korean, written by both in their respective languages. The music video for the song featured 50 dancers of different nationalities. The single peaked at number eighty-one in the US, at number fifty-five in Canada, and at number eighty-two in the UK. The song also debuted at number-one on the World Digital Song Sales.

Gomez released her debut studio album, Mala Santa, in October 2019. Primarily a reggaeton and latin pop record with urbano influences, it received generally positive reviews from critics, praising as a mature, bilingual statement of independence and artistry, with many highlighting its dance-worthy, sultry, and unapologetically feminine tone. The album debuted at number eighty-five on the US Billboard 200, and top five on the Billboard Top Latin Albums and Latin Rhythm Albums with 8,000 album units in its first week. It was supported by the singles "Mayores" with Bad Bunny, "Sin Pijama" with Natti Natasha, "Cuando Te Besé" with Argentine rapper Paulo Londra, "Dollar" with Puerto Rican rapper Myke Towers, and title track. The album's first two singles each reached the top eighty in the US, and each reached the top five on the Hot Latin Songs. "Mayores" was nominated for Top Latin Song at the Billboard Music Awards. "Cuando Te Besé" became her first number-one song in the Argentina Hot 100.

In November, she hosted the 2019 MTV Europe Music Awards. On November 10, Gomez collaborated with virtual hip-hop group True Damage on the single "Giants", in which she voices a character named Qiyana, in the video game League of Legends for the 2019 World Championship. The song features singers Keke Palmer, Thutmose, Duckwrth and Soyeon. The song is a multilingual track performed predominantly in English, with verses in Spanish and Korean. On the same day, they performed live during the opening ceremony of the finals, alongside holographic versions of their characters.

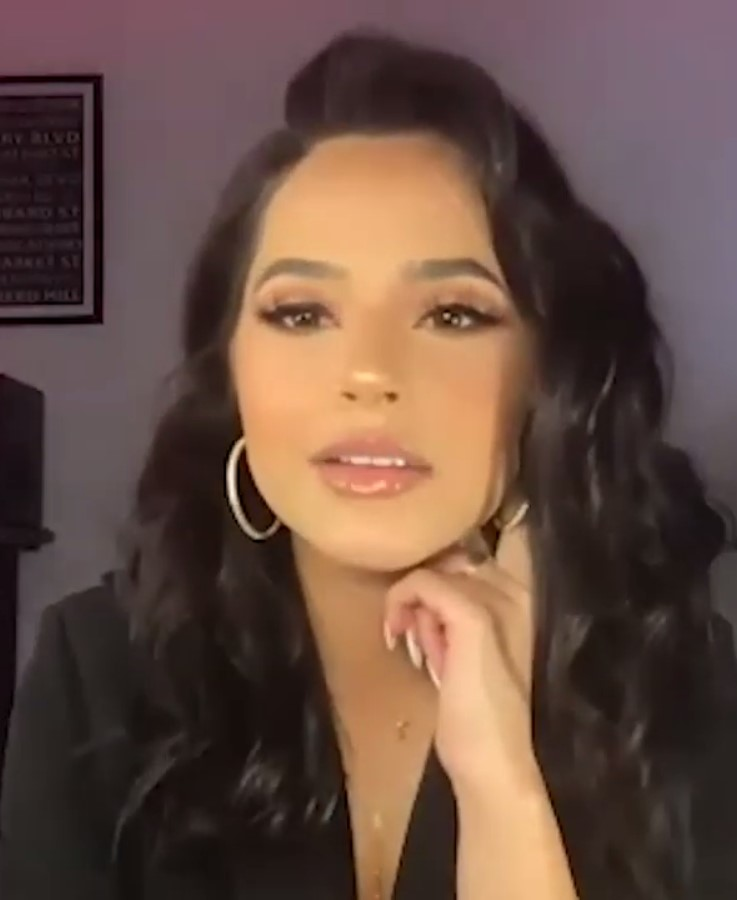
Gomez in 2020

In January 2020, Mexican singer Carlos Rivera released the single "Perdiendo la Cabeza" alongside Gomez and Puerto Rican singer Pedro Capó, becoming her first number-one song in Mexico. In March, Australian singer Saygrace released the remix of "Boys Ain't Shit" featuring Gomez. In April, Gomez released the standalone single "They Ain't Ready". In the same month, Cuban duo Gente de Zona and Gomez released the single "Muchacha". The single was nominated for the Latin Grammy Award for Best Urban Song. In May, Chiquis and Gomez released the single "Jolene", Spanish cover version of the 1974 song the same name. In June, Gomez appeared on Black Eyed Peas's song "Duro Hard", and Spanish singer Abraham Mateo's single "Tiempo Pa Olvidar". In July, Gomez released the standalone single "My Man", and its video-game inspired music video features her and boyfriend Sebastian Lletget.

She hosted and executive produced the Amazon Music podcast En La Sala - live from her living room during the lockdown, which premiered in September 2020. During the show, the singer and actress spoke to high-profile guests from Vice President-elect Kamala Harris about politics to reggaetón star J Balvin about mental health. In the same month, Gomez collaborated with Puerto Rican singer Juhn and Puerto Rican singer Lenny Tavárez on the single "Otro Día Lluvioso" featuring Dalex. In October, she was featured on the remix of Colombian singer Reykon's single "Latina" featuring Maluma and American rapper Tyga. In the same month, Gomez and Puerto Rican singer Ozuna released the standalone single "No Drama", which peaked at number twenty-three on the Hot Latin Songs. In December, she collaborated with Puerto Rican singer Jay Wheeler alongside Myke Towers on the remix of "La Curiosidad" featuring American rapper Arcángel, Puerto Rican duo Zion & Lennox, De la Ghetto and Puerto Rican rapper Brray, and was also featured on the remix of Mexican group Banda MS and American rapper Snoop Dogg's single "Qué Maldición".

=== 2021–2022: Esquemas ===
In February 2021, Gomez and Nigerian singer Burna Boy released the promotional single "Rotate". The song was used in Pepsi commercials featuring soccer players, including Lionel Messi. In March, Puerto Rican rapper Kevvo alongside Arcángel and Gomez released the single "Te Va Bien" featuring Puerto Rican rapper Darell. Gomez collaborated with American singer Trevor Daniel and Puerto Rican record producer Tainy on the song "F is For Friends", from soundtrack album of the American animated film The SpongeBob Movie: Sponge on the Run. Gomez was featured on American group Emotional Oranges's single "Down to Miami", and collaborated with Argentine rapper Khea alongside American singer-songwriter Julia Michaels on the single "Only One" featuring Jamaican songwriter and producer Di Genius. In August, Gomez was featured on Argentine singer María Becerra's single "Wow Wow". Billboard called the music track "a hitting reggaeton that has female empowerment anthem potential". The song reaching the top five in Argentina. In September, she collaborated with Mexican singer Sofía Reyes on the single "Mal de Amores", and Play-N-Skillz alongside Thalía on the single "Baila Así" featuring Chiquis. In October, Gomez collaborated with American singer Christina Aguilera alongside Argentine rapper Nicki Nicole on "Pa Mis Muchachas" featuring Argentine singer Nathy Peluso, which served as the lead single from Aguilera's EP titled La Fuerza and is part of the album, Aguilera. The song garnered three nominations at the 23rd Annual Latin Grammy Awards. Her contribution as a songwriter and featured artist on the song earned Gomez a nomination for Latin Grammy Award for Album of the Year.

She then hosted and executive produced the Facebook Watch talk show Face to Face with Becky G, which premiered in November 2021. The series features raw, unfiltered conversations with artists, celebrities and friends, focusing on topics relevant to her generation and the Latino community. Her first guest was American singer Demi Lovato. The series ran for one season. Gomez released the song "Lo Que Yo Diga" as part of the Koati film soundtrack. In December, Gomez released a reggaeton-infused cover of the Italian protest song "Bella Ciao", as a tribute to the final season of the Netflix series Money Heist.

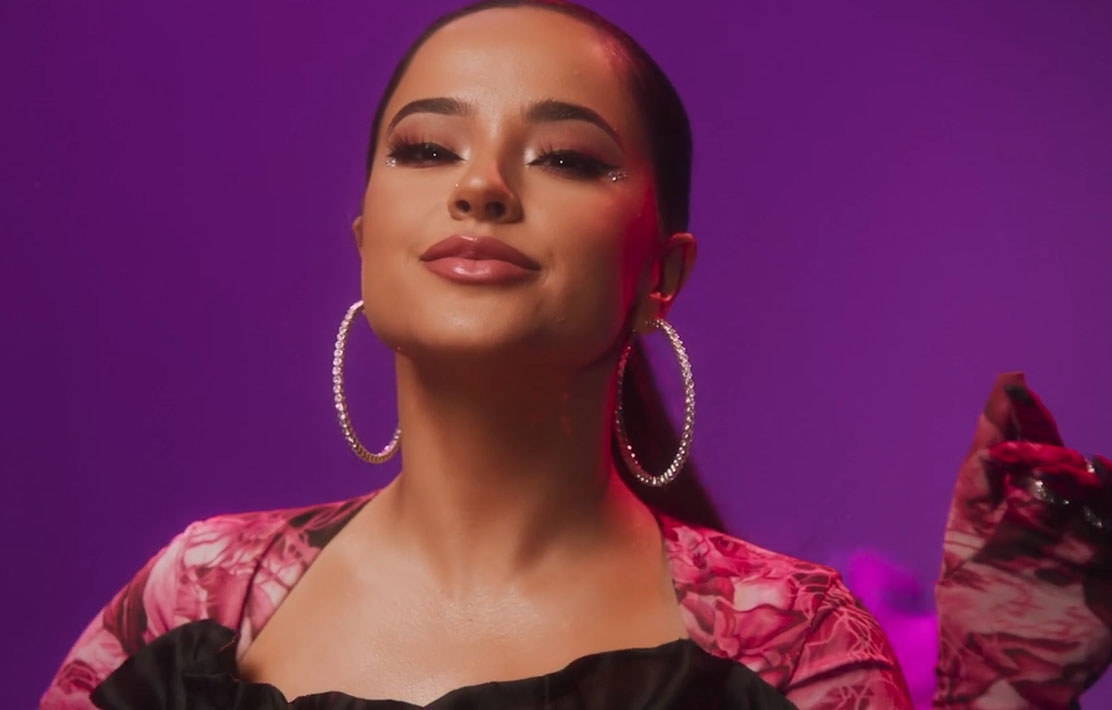
Becky G in 2022

In March 2022, Gomez alongside American singer Joe Jonas and choreographer Sean Bankhead served as judges and executive producers on the music competition television series Becoming a Popstar. In the same month, she featured on Daddy Yankee's song "Zona del Perreo" alongside Natti Natasha, from Yankee's eighth album, Legendaddy. In April, Regional Mexican group Marca MP and Gomez released the single "Ya Acabó". It reached the top ten on the Hot Latin Songs.

Gomez released her second studio album, Esquemas, in May 2022. Primarily a reggaeton and latin pop record with latin, pop and dance-pop influences, it received generally positive reviews from critics, praising its sonic diversity, personal growth, and themes of female empowerment. The album debuted at number ninety-two in the US, top five on the Top Latin Albums, and atop the Latin Pop Albums charts, with 11,000 album units sold in its first week. It was supported by the singles "Ram Pam Pam" with Natti Natasha (originally released on Natasha's second studio album, Nattividad), "Fulanito" with Dominican rapper El Alfa, "Mamiii" with Karol G, and "Bailé Con Mi Ex". "Mamiii" an achieved success that topped in Spain, the Billboard Latin charts, and several Latin American countries, while reached the top five on the Global 200, and peaked at number fifteen on the Hot 100, where it became her highest-charting single. The song won three accolades at the Latin American Music Awards, received a nomination for Best Urban Song at the Latin Grammy Awards, and four Billboard Latin Music Awards nominations.

Gomez starred in stoner comedy film Good Mourning, alongside MGK, Mod Sun, Dove Cameron and Megan Fox. The film received universally negative reviews from critics and was a commercial failure. In July, Gomez collaborated with Argentine singer Tini and Anitta on "La Loto", which reached the top ten in Argentina. In the same month, Gomez hosted alongside Mexican TikTok star Jimena Jiménez the 2022 MTV MIAW Awards. In September, Gomez and Spanish singer Daviles de Novelda released the standalone single "Amantes", which is her first song in the bachata genre. In October, Gomez alongside Colombian singer Greeicy, María Becerra and Tini, was featured on the remix of Venezuelan-American singer Elena Rose's single "La Ducha".

=== 2023–2024: Esquinas and Encuentros ===
In February 2023, American regional Mexican band Fuerza Regida and Gomez released the standalone single "Te Quiero Besar". In March, Gomez released the standalone single "Arranca" featuring Dominican singer Omega. In April, Gomez performed at the Coachella 2023. In May, Gomez appeared on the remix of American band OneRepublic's single "I Ain't Worried". In June, Gomez released the promotional single "The Fire Inside", from the Flamin' Hot film soundtrack, and was nominated for the Academy Award for Best Original Song. Gomez and Nigerian singer Ayra Starr performed the song "Take It To The Top", from Metro Boomin's soundtrack album of the American animated superhero film Spider-Man: Across the Spider-Verse. Gomez was also featured on the remix of Nigerian singer Kizz Daniel's single "Cough", and collaborated with Haitian DJ Michaël Brun alongside English singer Anne-Marie on "Coming Your Way". Gomez voiced Khaji-Da, an entity inside Jaime Reyes Scarab, in the DC film Blue Beetle. Gomez embarked on her first headlining tour, the Mi Casa, Tu Casa Tour in September 2023.

Gomez released her third studio album, Esquinas, in September 2023. Primarily a regional Mexican record, it incorporates mariachi and corridos tumbados. The album is a tribute to her grandparents, who emigrated from Mexico to the United States. Critics responded positively, praising its as a heartfelt, authentic homage to her Mexican-American roots. Writing for Rolling Stone, Julyssa Lopez calling it a "gorgeous exploration" of heritage, rather than just a trend-driven project. The album debuted at number 109 in the US, top ten on the Top Latin Albums, and top five on the Regional Mexican Albums charts, with 11,000 album units in its first week. It was supported by the singles "Chanel" with Mexican singer-songwriter Peso Pluma, "La Nena" with Mexican singer-songwriter Gabito Ballesteros, "2ndo Chance" with American singer-songwriter Iván Cornejo, and "Por el Contrario" with Mexican-American singers Ángela Aguilar and Leonardo Aguilar. "Chanel" reached the top ten on the Hot Latin Songs, and also peaked at number fifty-five in the US. "Por el Contrario" topped the Latin Airplay and Regional Mexican Airplay charts, and was nominated for the Latin Grammy Award for Best Regional Mexican Song. In November, South Korean singer Bibi and Gomez released the standalone single "Amigos".

In March 2024, she released the promotional single "Boomerang". In the same month, Gomez was featured on the song "On My Body" from South African singer Tyla's debut album, Tyla. The song reaching the top ten on the US Afrobeats Songs. In April, Gomez alongside Thalía, Mexican actress Alejandra Espinoza and Puerto Rican actor Carlos Ponce, hosted the Latin American Music Awards 2024. In May, Gomez was featured on Black Eyed Peas and El Alfa's single "Tonight", as the lead single from the soundtrack of the buddy cop action comedy film Bad Boys: Ride or Die, and collaboration with Brazilian singer Luísa Sonza and Brazilian DJ Papatinho, titled "Flores Pa Ti" was released as part of the film's soundtrack. Gomez appeared on the remix of American rapper Blxst's song "Rewind" alongside Colombian singer Feid, and collaborated with American mariachi band Mariachi Divas on the single "Bluetooth". She subsequently signed with the WME and State of the Art companies to manage her career.

Gomez released her fourth studio album, Encuentros, in October 2024. Primarily a regional Mexican record, incorporating mariachi, ranchera, and corrido with modern fusions, including reggaeton and bolero. It received positive reviews, with Rolling Stone critic Ernesto Lechner praised as a mature, "contemporary música mexicana classic" that showcases deeper vocal, emotional growth compared to her previous work. The album debuted at number fifteen on the Top Latin Albums and reached the top ten on the Regional Mexican Albums charts. It was supported by the singles "Mercedes" with Mexican singer Óscar Maydon, "Como Diablos" and "Otro Capítulo". "Mercedes" reaching the top five on the Latin Airplay and atop on the Regional Mexican Airplay charts. Gomez embarked on her second headlining tour, the Casa Gomez: Otro Capítulo Tour in October 2024.

=== 2025–present: Rebbeca and Baraja Bendita ===
In February 2025, Gomez and Canadian singer Jessie Reyez were featured on Emotional Oranges's single "Candy Gum". In April, Gomez was featured on the song "Tek" from Nigerian singer Davido's fifth album, 5ive. The song reached the top twenty on the US Afrobeats Songs. In May, Gomez and Colombian singer Manuel Turizo released the standalone single "Que Haces".

Gomez was the subject of the documentary film Rebbeca, directed by Jennifer Tiexiera and Gabriela Cavanagh. The film premiered at the Tribeca Film Festival in June 2025, and was subsequently released on Netflix. and in select theaters. Critics have praised the film's emotional depth, particularly its handling of her family's struggles, though some note it can feel a bit like a promotional highlight reel. In October, Gomez was featured on the song "Hard Way" from American rapper Bia's debut album, Bianca. In December, she released the song "Hablamos Mañana".

In February 2026, Gomez was confirmed to star in director Danny Ramirez's sports drama film Baton alongside Lewis Pullman, Camila Mendes and Diego Calva. In March, she collaborated with South Korean singer Yeonjun and Myke Towers for the official 2026 World Baseball Classic song, "Make It Count". In April, German DJ and producer Topic and Gomez released the single "Sorry Papi", which peaked at number sixteen on the Hot Latin Pop Songs. In May, Mexican American guitarist Carlos Santana and Gomez released the song titled "Mi Gran Amor" in solidarity with the Latin community, in response to ICE raids. In the same month, Gomez was featured alternate version of "Lemonade" from South Korean girl group Aespa's second album, Lemonade. In July, Gomez collaborated with American record producer Benny Blanco and singer Selena Gomez on the single "Te Olvido (La La)", which peaked at number fourteen on the Hot Latin Songs.

Gomez released her fifth studio album, Baraja Bendita, in August 2026. Primarily a pop and rap record infused with a diverse range of latin music styles, it is her first album after departing from Kemosabe Records. The album was supported by the singles "Marathon" with British music producer Elkan, "Epa", and "Patrona". The album debuted at number twelve on the Top Latin Albums, top five on the Latin Pop Albums, and top ten on the Latin Rhythm Albums with 7,000 album units in its first week. The tracks "Chula" and "Mal Tiempo" debuted at number eleven on the Hot Latin Pop Songs and at number nineteen on the Hot Tropical Songs, respectively. In October, Gomez joined the cast of Gina Rodriguez's film House of Guerrero.

== Artistry ==
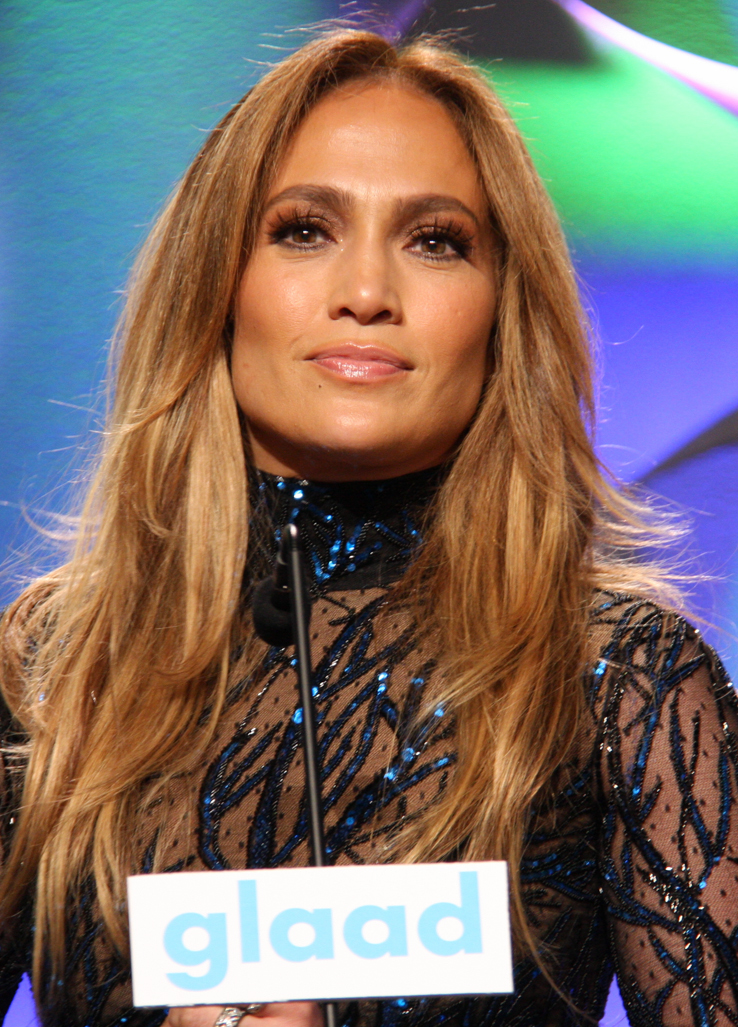
Gomez has cited Hispanic American singers Selena (left) and Jennifer Lopez (right) as major musical influences.

Gomez is a versatile rap and pop artist in both English and Spanish languages. Vocally, she has been described as a soprano. Her music is a reflection of her dual identity, often blending genres to create what Gomez calls her "200% identity" (100% American and 100% Mexican). Her style ranges from rhythmic, fast-paced rap verses to soft, melodic ballads. She is known for "talk-singing" in her urban tracks, which adds a conversational and relatable feel to her music. She sometimes blends English and Spanish in one song, making her music listenable to the speakers of both languages, the majority of which belong to the Gen Z Latino audience.

Gomez is an active co-writer on most of her music, using bilingual lyrics in English and Spanish to share her Mexican-American heritage and personal journey. She has incorporated pop, reggaeton, and regional Mexican sounds in her music to connect with her roots.

Her debut studio album, Mala Santa, established her in the Latin urban music scene, moving away from her earlier pop sound. Her second album, Esquemas, celebrates her bicultural identity and personal growth, focusing on empowerment, Latin pop, and reggaeton. Her albums, Esquinas and Encuentros, inspired by her Mexican roots and her late grandfather, aim to honor the music she grew up with, including corridos, boleros, and mariachi. It is a deeply personal and "raw" exploration of her heritage and the "border" experience.

Gomez has cited late Tejano singer Selena, as well as Jennifer Lopez, Thalía, Jenni Rivera, Shakira and Christina Aguilera as influences.

== Business and ventures ==
=== Business and endorsements ===
Gomez began representing CoverGirl in July 2014. As the spokeswoman for the company, she filmed commercials to promote the brand and featured their products in her music videos. In December 2018, Gomez released a makeup collection called Salvaje with cosmetics brand ColourPop Cosmetics.

In 2020, she joined the ownership group of Angel City FC of the National Women's Soccer League. In August, Gomez partnered with Dime Optics to launch her first-ever sunglasses collection including eight different styles. In March 2021, she andPrettyLittleThing launched the PLT X Becky G collection on her 24th birthday. In 2022, Gomez, Tini and Anitta, were the spokespeople for WhatsApp's "Gender Equality in Music & Beyond" campaign. In October 2022, Gomez collaborated with Patrón Tequila, celebrating her Mexican heritage through multiple cultural, lifestyle, and music-related collaborations. She launched a limited-edition, artist-designed packaging for Patrón Silver and featured their products in her music videos.

In June 2023, she was named the Creative Director for this swimwear brand Gonza, focusing on uplifting Latin creatives. In July, Gomez partnered with Cheetos for the "Deja tu Huella" global campaign. In January 2025, Gomez collaborated with Fabletics, and launched a 20-piece activewear capsule collection that includes jumpsuits, bomber jackets, and seamless sets on the Becky G x Fabletics Collection. In April, she signed an endorsement deal with Garnier, becoming the face of its "Put It To The Test" campaign for the Sleek & Stay Hair Serum. In April, Gomez launched a colorful home decor line at Walmart in collaboration with her mother Alejandra Esquivias. In July 2026, Gomez was announced as a brand ambassador for Hugo Boss Bottled Beyond for Her, alongside Jessica Chastain and Tara Davis-Woodhall.

=== Treslúce Beauty ===
In June 2021, Gomez launched her own makeup brand, Treslúce Beauty. The brand is an ode to Gomez's Mexican roots, featuring packaging inspired by Talavera pottery and product names in both English and Spanish affirmations. Mexican Blue Agave, sustainably sourced from Jalisco, Mexico, is infused into the formulas to provide unique softness and skin-soothing benefits. All products are cruelty-free, vegan-friendly, and PETA-approved. It was initially only available through its official webstore until March 2022, when the brand also was put on stock at Ulta Beauty stores in the US. In late 2024, Treslúce Beauty shut down its operations. The brand quietly disappeared from major retail shelves, and the official website eventually went offline, signaling the end of the venture.

== Philanthropy and advocacy ==
Gomez is highly active in philanthropy, frequently donating to causes supporting education, disaster relief, and social justice. Gomez is known for using her platform to advocate for particularly regarding immigration, LGBTQ+ rights and the Latin community.

She released the song titled "We Are Mexico" in solidarity with the Latin community, in response to Donald Trump's remarks against illegal Mexican immigrants. On World Autism Awareness Day in 2019, Gomez teamed up with Pop Sockets to donate 50 percent of each sale to Autism Speaks. Gomezpartnered with Global Citizen to advocate for women's economic empowerment, and visited and supported women-owned businesses in Mexico.

During the airing of her En La Sala podcast, she donated $10K to a charity of her choice following every broadcast. She has actively promoted voting, collaborating with California Governor Gavin Newsom in 2020 to urge young people and the Latin community to vote in the presidential election. Gomez is a critic of racism and supported the Black Lives Matter movement. She became one of the co-chairs for Michelle Obama's When We All Vote organization in 2022. Gomez is a high-profile ambassador and official partner of the non-profit Save the Music Foundation. She leverages her global platform to champion and fund music education programs in public schools, particularly within underrepresented communities. Gomez has been a consistent critic of United States Immigration and Customs Enforcement (ICE). She has used social media to support immigrant communities facing raids. For the 2026 MusiCares Person of the Year gala, she painted "FUCK ICE" on her nails.

== Personal life ==
=== Relationships ===
Gomez briefly dated American singer Austin Mahone in 2015. Gomez began dating professional soccer player Sebastian Lletget in June 2016. They became engaged in December 2022. Lletget apologized for cheating allegations in late March 2023. They ended their engagement that same year, although the pair remain together.

=== Health ===
Gomez has been open about her struggles with anxiety and panic attacks. While on tour with Fifth Harmony in October 2017, Gomez suffered an "out-of-control fan attack" while in Mexico City. Gomez took to Snapchat to speak about the incident and also revealed that she had been dealing with anxiety issues.

== Achievements ==
Gomez has won three American Music Awards, a Billboard Latin Music Award, an iHeartRadio Music Award, nine Latin American Music Awards, five Lo Nuestro Awards, three People's Choice Awards and seven Premios Juventud. Gomez was nominated for two Billboard Music Awards, seven Latin Grammy Awards and a MTV Video Music Award. For acting, Gomez has been nominated for two Teen Choice Awards.

Gomez has received several industry honors, including the Impact Award (2023) at the Billboard Women in Music event, and Global Impact Award (2026) at the Billboard Latin Women in Music event. She was named to Forbes 30 Under 30 in 2023, and Time included her on its annual list of the most influential rising stars in 2025.

Gomez was honored by the Latin Recording Academy as one of the Leading Ladies of Entertainment in 2018, and received the Inspira Award from the Hispanic Heritage Foundation in 2015. She accepted the Agent of Change award at the Premios Juventud in 2020. She has been recognized as one of Billboard's 21 Under 21, and one of Rolling Stone's "18 Teens Shaking Up Pop Culture", and Vogue México's 20 Under 30. Gomez was given the keys to the cities of Coachella, California in April, and Inglewood, California in October 2023.

Her songs "Shower" and "Mamiii" have reached over one billion streams on Spotify, and three of her songs have reached over one billion views on YouTube. In August 2026, she has earned over 33 million monthly listeners and 17 million followers on Spotify.

== Discography ==
- Mala Santa (2019)
- Esquemas (2022)
- Esquinas (2023)
- Encuentros (2024)
- Baraja Bendita (2026)

== Filmography ==
- Power Rangers (2017)
- Gnome Alone (2017)
- A.X.L. (2018)
- Good Mourning (2022)
- Blue Beetle (2023)
- Rebbeca (2025)

== Tours ==
Headlining

- Mi Casa, Tu Casa Tour (2023)
- Casa Gomez: Otro Capítulo Tour (2024)

Co-headlining tours

- La Familia Tour with J Balvin (2015)

Opening act

- Demi Lovato – Demi World Tour (2014)
- Katy Perry – Prismatic World Tour (2014)
- Jason Derulo – Talk Dirty Tour (2014)
- Fifth Harmony – PSA Tour (2017)
- Enrique Iglesias – Enrique Iglesias and Pitbull Live! (2017)
- Karol G – Viajando Por El Mundo Tour (2026)
