= Ya Acabó =

Single by Marca MP and Becky G

from the album DEV, Vol. 2
- English title: "It Already Ended"
- Released: April 28, 2022
- Genre: Regional mexican
- Length: 2:56 (duo version); 3:09 (solo version)
- Label: Sony Latin
- Songwriters: Pedro Vargas; Édgar Barrera; Elena Rose
- Producers: Édgar Barrera; Pedro Vargas

Marca MP singles chronology
"El Velador" (2021)	"Ya Acabó" (2022)	"Hombre De Respeto" (2021)

Becky G singles chronology
"Mamiii" (2022)	"Ya Acabó" (2022)	"Bailé Con Mi Ex" (2022)

Music video
- "Ya Acabó" on YouTube

"Ya Acabó" is a song by Regional Mexican group Marca MP. The song was released by Sony Latin on February 19, 2021. A duo version of the song with American singer Becky G was released on April 28, 2022.

== Live performances ==
Marca MP and Gomez performed the song together live for the first time at the Premios de la Radio on November 4, 2022, and second time was at the Coachella 2023 on April 14, 2023.

== Accolades ==
Awards and nominations for "Ya Acabó"
Organization	Year	Category	Result	Ref.
Latin American Music Awards	2023	Best Collaboration – Regional Mexican	Won	
Premios de la Radio	2022	Collaboration of the Year	Won	

== Charts ==
=== Becky G version ===
Chart performance for "Ya Acabó"
Chart (2022)	Peak position
Mexico (Billboard)	13
Mexico (Billboard Mexican Airplay)	14
Mexico (Billboard Popular Airplay)	3
US Bubbling Under Hot 100 (Billboard)	1
US Hot Latin Songs (Billboard)	7
US Latin Airplay (Billboard)	34
US Regional Mexican Airplay (Billboard)	14

== Certifications ==
Certifications for "Ya Acabó"
Region	Certification	Certified units/sales
Mexico (AMPROFON)	Platinum	140,000^{‡}
^{‡} Sales+streaming figures based on certification alone.
