= Dollar (song) =

Single by Becky G and Myke Towers

from the album Mala Santa
- Language: Spanish
- Released: July 10, 2019
- Recorded: June 2018
- Length: 3:23
- Label: Kemosabe
- Songwriters: Rebbeca Marie Gomez; Myke Towers; Luian Malavé Nieves; Xavier Semper; Edgar Semper; Nate Campany; Rafa Rodriquez; Daniel Ignacio Rondon; Elena Rose; Héctor Enrique Ramos Carbia; Jose M. Reyes Diaz; Orlando J. Cepeda Matos
- Producers: Dave Kutch; DJ Luian; Mambo Kingz; Hydro

Becky G singles chronology
"Que Me Baile" (2019)	"Dollar" (2019)	"Rebota (Remix)" (2019)

Myke Towers singles chronology
"Una Vida Para Recordar" (2019)	"Dollar" (2019)	"Sin Forzar" (2019)

Music video
- "Dollar" on YouTube

"Dollar" is a song recorded by American singer Becky G and Puerto Rican rapper and singer Myke Towers. It was released by Kemosabe Records on July 10, 2019, as the fourth single from Gomez's debut album Mala Santa (2019).

== Music video ==
The music video was released on July 12. It features Gomez counting money in various outfits. These scenes are spliced with Towers in a meeting with other people and appearing to be mad about something while Gomez waits in a room next door.

Gomez later retweeted a fan tweet, giving their own interpretation of the clip, stating that it represents the singer's internal situation with her labels: they keep promising her things, like letting her release an album, but Gomez doesn't believe their words anymore (alluding to the line "No pago mi renta con palabras/ no valen nada"). Towers' character is her lawyer/manager trying to get the executives to finally let her release an album, but fails.

== Live performance ==
Gomez performed the song live for the first time at the Amazon Music's 2019 Prime Day Concert. She later sang the song at the Latin American Music Awards of 2019 on October 17, the day of her debut album's release.

== Accolades ==
Awards and nominations for "Dollar"
Organization	Year	Category	Result	Ref.
SESAC Latina Music Awards	2020	Winning Songs	Won	

== Charts ==
Chart (2019)	Peak position
Argentina (Argentina Hot 100)	37
Puerto Rico (Monitor Latino)	18
Spain (PROMUSICAE)	19
US Hot Latin Songs (Billboard)	28
US Latin Airplay (Billboard)	22
US Latin Rhythm Airplay (Billboard)	15

=== Year-end charts ===
Chart (2019)	Position
US Hot Latin Songs (Billboard)	79

== Certifications ==
Region	Certification	Certified units/sales
Mexico (AMPROFON)	2× Platinum+Gold	150,000^{‡}
Spain (Promusicae)	Platinum	40,000^{‡}
^{‡} Sales+streaming figures based on certification alone.
