= Édgar Barrera production discography =

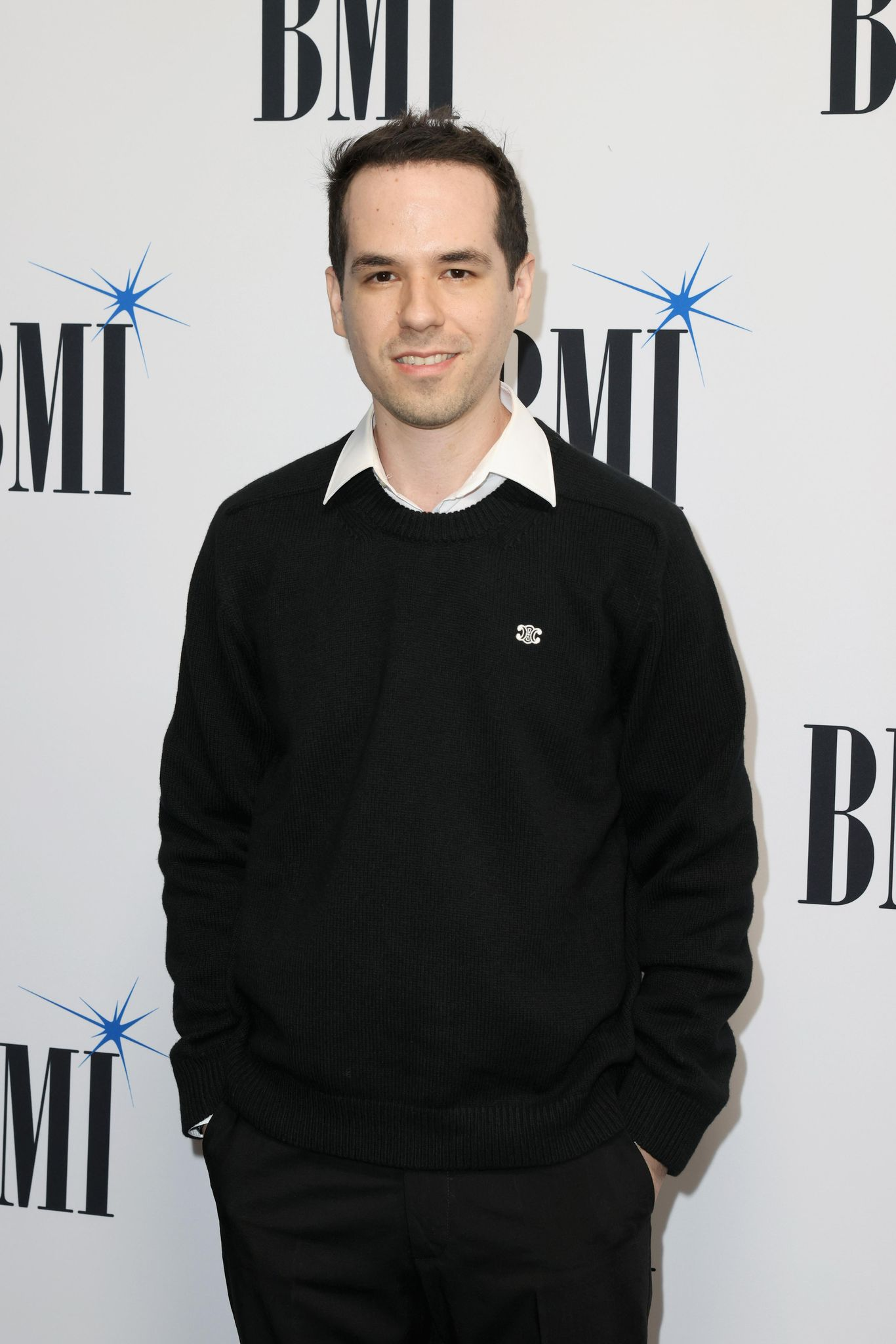

American record producer and songwriter Édgar Barrera has served as co-writer and co-producer on albums by Karol G, Shakira, Peso Pluma, Ariana Grande, Beyoncé, Madonna, Becky G, Camilo, Carlos Vives, Maluma, Carín León, Natanael Cano, ChocQuibTown, Christian Nodal, and Grupo Frontera. He has also written and produced individual tracks with artists including Camila Cabello, Christina Aguilera, Bad Bunny, CNCO, Daddy Yankee, J Balvin, Ozuna, Selena Gomez, Thalía, among others.

== Production and writing credits ==
=== 2010s ===
Year	Artist	Song	Album	Songwriter	Producer	Recording Engineer	Executive Producer
2011	Carlos Vives	"Los Niños de la Soledad"	Positive Generation	-	-	check	-
2011	Bustamante	"Como Tú Ninguna"	Mío	-	-	check	-
2011	Bustamante	"Cerca De Mi Piel"	Mío	-	-	check	-
2011	Bustamante	"Bandera Blanca"	Mío	-	-	check	-
2011	Bustamante	"No Existe Nadie"	Mío	-	-	check	-
2011	Bustamante	"Gritare"	Mío	-	-	check	-
2011	Bustamante	"Bandera Blanca" (featuring Pastora Soler)	Mío	-	-	check	-
2011	Juan Fernando Velasco	"Hoy Que No Estas" (featuring Noel Schajris)	A Contratiempo	-	-	check	-
2011	Juan Fernando Velasco	"Nunca"	A Contratiempo	-	-	check	-
2011	Juan Fernando Velasco	"Chao Lola"	A Contratiempo	-	-	check	-
2011	Juan Fernando Velasco	"Dicen"	A Contratiempo	-	-	check	-
2011	Juan Fernando Velasco	"A Tu Lado" (featuring Reyli)	A Contratiempo	-	-	check	-
2011	Juan Fernando Velasco	"Dame Un Instante"	A Contratiempo	-	-	check	-
2011	Juan Fernando Velasco	"No Te Escuche"	A Contratiempo	-	-	check	-
2011	Juan Fernando Velasco	"Para Que No Me Olvides"	A Contratiempo	-	-	check	-
2011	Juan Fernando Velasco	"Toma Mi Corazon"	A Contratiempo	-	-	check	-
2011	Juan Fernando Velasco	"Te Lo Pido Por Favor"	A Contratiempo	-	-	check	-
2011	Juan Fernando Velasco	"Yo Nací Aquí" (featuring Jorge Celedón)	A Contratiempo	-	-	check	-
2011	ChocQuibTown	"Calentura" (featuring Tego Calderón	Eso Es Lo Que Hay	-	-	check	-
2011	ChocQuibTown	"Puro Mani" (featuring Luis Enrique)	Eso Es Lo Que Hay	-	-	check	-
2011	ChocQuibTown	"Uh La La"	Eso Es Lo Que Hay	-	-	check	-
2011	ChocQuibTown	"Hasta El Techo"	Eso Es Lo Que Hay	-	-	check	-
2011	ChocQuibTown	"En El Aire"	Eso Es Lo Que Hay	-	-	check	-
2011	ChocQuibTown	"Tú Canción"	Eso Es Lo Que Hay	-	-	check	-
2011	ChocQuibTown	"Levantense Todos"	Eso Es Lo Que Hay	-	-	check	-
2011	ChocQuibTown	"Mango Biche"	Eso Es Lo Que Hay	-	-	check	-
2011	ChocQuibTown	"Robber"	Eso Es Lo Que Hay	-	-	check	-
2011	ChocQuibTown	"Lindo Cielo"	Eso Es Lo Que Hay	-	-	check	-
2012	Selena	"Amor Prohibido" (featuring Samo	Enamorada de Ti	-	-	check	-
2012	Selena	"Techno Cumbia 2012 (2012 Remix)"	Enamorada de Ti	-	-	check	-
2012	Kany García	"Me Quedo"	Kany Garcia	-	-	check	-
2012	Kany García	"Cuando Se Va El Amor"	Kany Garcia	-	-	check	-
2012	Kany García	"Que Te Vaya Mal"	Kany Garcia	-	-	check	-
2012	Kany García	"Adiós"	Kany Garcia	-	-	check	-
2012	Kany García	"Demasiado Bueno"	Kany Garcia	-	-	check	-
2012	Kany García	"Esta Soledad" (featuring Dani Martin)	Kany Garcia	-	-	check	-
2012	Kany García	"Que Me Quieras" (featuring Jorge Celedón)	Kany Garcia	-	-	check	-
2012	Kany García	"Pasaporte"	Kany Garcia	-	-	check	-
2012	Kany García	"Hoy Ya Me Voy" (featuring Franco De Vita)	Kany Garcia	-	-	check	-
2012	Kany García	"Alguien"	Kany Garcia	-	-	check	-
2012	Kany García	"Estigma De Amor" (featuring Antonio Carmona)	Kany Garcia	-	-	check	-
2012	Kany García	"Si Yo Me Olvido"	Kany Garcia	-	-	check	-
2012	Mister Chivo	"Desde El Cielo"	Bien Firmes	check	-	-	-
2012	Alejandro Sanz	"La Música No Se Toca"	La Música No Se Toca	-	-	check	-
2012	Alejandro Sanz	"No Me Compares"	La Música No Se Toca	-	-	check	-
2012	Alejandro Sanz	"Se Vende"	La Música No Se Toca	-	-	check	-
2012	Tony Bennett	"The Best Is Yet To Come" (featuring Chayanne)	Viva Duets	check	-	-	-
2012	Tony Bennett	"Don't Get Around Much Anymore" (featuring Miguel Bosé	Viva Duets	check	-	-	-
2012	Tony Bennett	"Rags To Riches" (featuring Romeo Santos	Viva Duets	check	-	-	-
2012	Thalia	"Ojala"	Habitame Siempre	check	-	-	-
2012	Jorge Villamizar	"Todo Lo Que Quieres Es Bailar"	Non-album single	-	-	check	-
2013	Alerta Zero	"Dígale"	Invencibles	check	-	-	-
2013	Banda Los Recoditos	"Sin Su Amor"	El Free	check	-	-	-
2013	Carlos Vives	"Volví a Nacer"	Corazón Profundo	-	-	check	-
2013	Carlos Vives	"Volví a Nacer (Versión Balada)"	Corazón Profundo	-	check	check	-
2013	Carlos Vives	"Como Le Gusta a Tu Cuerpo" (featuring Michel Teló)	Corazón Profundo	-	-	check	-
2013	Carlos Vives	"Bailar Contigo"	Corazón Profundo	-	-	check	-
2013	Carlos Vives	"Corazón Profundo"	Corazón Profundo	-	-	check	-
2013	Carlos Vives	"Amanecer"	Corazón Profundo	-	-	check	-
2013	Carlos Vives	"Salvar Tu Amor"	Corazón Profundo	-	-	check	-
2013	Carlos Vives	"Hoy Me Desperté En Otro Lugar"	Corazón Profundo	-	-	check	-
2013	Carlos Vives	"La Foto De Los Dos"	Corazón Profundo	-	-	check	-
2013	Carlos Vives	"Y Entonces Pa' Que Estoy Yo"	Corazón Profundo	-	-	check	-
2013	Carlos Vives	"La Fantástica"	Corazón Profundo	-	-	check	-
2013	Carlos Vives	"La Perla"	Corazón Profundo	-	-	check	-
2013	Carlos Vives	"Déjalo Pasar"	Corazón Profundo	-	-	check	-
2013	Carlos Vives	"Bailar Contigo (Versión Cumbia)"	Bailar Contigo - The Remixes	-	check	check	-
2013	Carlos Vives	"Como Le Gusta a Tu Cuerpo (Versión Cumbia)" (featuring Michel Teló)	Como Le Gusta A Tu Cuerpo - The Remixes	-	check	check	-
2013	Lucky Diaz and the Family Jam Band	-	¡Fantastico!	-	-	check	-
2013	Samo	"Sin Ti"	Inevitable	check	check	check	-
2013	Samo	"Tan Sólo Pido"	Inevitable	-	check	check	-
2013	Samo	"Un Nuevo Sol"	Inevitable	-	check	check	-
2013	Samo	"Lejos De Tu Alma"	Inevitable	check	check	check	-
2013	Samo	"Quiero Escuchar Tu Voz"	Inevitable	-	check	check	-
2013	A.B. Quintanilla and Kumbia All Starz	"Botella de Veneno"	Blanco y Negro	check	-	check	-
2013	Pee Wee	"Duele Decirte Adiós"	Vive2Life	check	check	check	-
2013	Pee Wee	"Tonight"	Vive2Life	-	-	check	-
2013	Pee Wee	"Oh Donna (Come Back To Me)"	Vive2Life	-	-	check	-
2013	Pee Wee	"Bien Sabes Tú" (featuring Río Roma)	Vive2Life	check	check	check	-
2013	Pee Wee	"Dame Tu Amor (Gimme Your Love)" (featuring Pitbull)	Vive2Life	-	-	check	-
2013	Pee Wee	"Make The Lights Go"	Vive2Life	-	-	check	-
2013	Pee Wee	"Dónde Está"	Vive2Life	-	check	check	-
2013	Pee Wee	"Assim Você Mata O Papai"	Vive2Life	-	-	check	-
2013	Pee Wee	"Kukere"	Vive2Life	-	-	check	-
2013	Carlos Baute	"Yo Quisiera Amar Como Los Sabios"	En El Buzón De Tu Corazón	-	-	check	-
2013	Carlos Baute	"Te Ruego Perdón"	En El Buzón De Tu Corazón	-	-	check	-
2013	Carlos Baute	"Que Quieres Tu De Mí"	En El Buzón De Tu Corazón	-	-	check	-
2013	Carlos Baute	"Intenta Respetar"	En El Buzón De Tu Corazón	-	-	check	-
2013	Carlos Baute	"En El Buzón De Tu Corazón"	En El Buzón De Tu Corazón	-	-	check	-
2013	Carlos Baute	"Por Que Cambiaste De Repente"	En El Buzón De Tu Corazón	-	-	check	-
2013	Carlos Baute	"Espero No Sientas Rencor"	En El Buzón De Tu Corazón	-	-	check	-
2013	Carlos Baute	"Como Decir Que No"	En El Buzón De Tu Corazón	-	-	check	-
2013	Carlos Baute	"No Hay Nadie en Este Mundo"	En El Buzón De Tu Corazón	-	-	check	-
2013	Carlos Baute	"Prometo Hacerte Feliz"	En El Buzón De Tu Corazón	-	-	check	-
2013	Carlos Baute	"De Qué Me Servirá La Vida"	En El Buzón De Tu Corazón	-	-	check	-
2013	Prince Royce	"Darte Un Beso"	Soy El Mismo	-	-	check	-
2013	Prince Royce	"You Are The One"	Soy El Mismo	check	-	-	-
2014	Mister Chivo	"Muchas Gracias"	Vivencias	-	check	check	-
2014	Lucky Diaz and the Family Jam Band	-	Aquí, Allá	-	-	check	-
2014	Carlos Vives	"El Mar de Sus Ojos" (featuring ChocQuibTown)	Más Corazón Profundo	-	-	check	-
2014	Carlos Vives	"Cuando Nos Volavamos a Encontrar" (featuring Marc Anthony)	Más Corazón Profundo	-	-	check	-
2014	Carlos Vives	"Un Pobre Loco"	Más Corazón Profundo	-	-	check	-
2014	Carlos Vives	"Ella Es Mi Fiesta"	Más Corazón Profundo	-	-	check	-
2014	Carlos Vives	"Mil Canciones"	Más Corazón Profundo	-	-	check	-
2014	Carlos Vives	"El Sueño"	Más Corazón Profundo	-	-	check	-
2014	Carlos Vives	"Las Cosas De La Vida"	Más Corazón Profundo	-	-	check	-
2014	Carlos Vives	"Hijo Del Vallenato"	Más Corazón Profundo	-	-	check	-
2014	Carlos Vives	"La Cumbia De Todos"	Más Corazón Profundo	-	-	check	-
2014	Carlos Vives	"Sueños Rotos"	Más Corazón Profundo			check	
2014	Carlos Vives	"La Copa De Todos"	Más Corazón Profundo	-	-	check	
2014	Carlos Vives	"El Mar de Sus Ojos (Versión Cumbia)" (featuring ChocQuibTown)	Non-album single	-	check	check	-
2014	Carlos Vives	"El Mar de Sus Ojos (Versión Pop)" (featuring ChocQuibTown)	Non-album single	-	check	check	-
2014	Carlos Vives	"Cuando Nos Volavamos a Encontrar (Versión Salsa)" (featuring Marc Anthony)	Cuando Nos Volvamos a Encontrar (Remixes)	-	-	check	-
2014	Carlos Vives	"Cuando Nos Volavamos a Encontrar (Versión Cumbia)" (featuring Marc Anthony)	Cuando Nos Volvamos a Encontrar (Remixes)	-	check	check	-
2014	Alerta Zero	"El Arte de Amar"	El Arte de Amar	check	-	-	-
2014	Juan Luis Guerra	"Cookies & Cream"	Todo Tiene Su Hora	-	-	check	-
2014	Juan Luis Guerra	"Tus Besos"	Todo Tiene Su Hora	-	-	check	-
2014	Juan Luis Guerra	"Canto a Colombia"	Todo Tiene Su Hora	-	-	check	-
2014	Juan Luis Guerra	"Todo Tiene Su Hora"	Todo Tiene Su Hora	-	-	check	-
2014	Juan Luis Guerra	"Dime Nora Mia"	Todo Tiene Su Hora	-	-	check	-
2014	Juan Luis Guerra	"Para Que Sepas"	Todo Tiene Su Hora	-	-	check	-
2014	Juan Luis Guerra	"El Capitán"	Todo Tiene Su Hora	-	-	check	-
2014	Juan Luis Guerra	"Muchachita Linda"	Todo Tiene Su Hora	-	-	check	-
2014	Juan Luis Guerra	"Todo Pasa"	Todo Tiene Su Hora	-	-	check	-
2014	Juan Luis Guerra	"De Moca A Paris" (featuring (Johnny Ventura)	Todo Tiene Su Hora	-	-	check	-
2014	Prince Royce	"Para Llegar A Ti"	Soy El Mismo (Deluxe)	check	check	check	-
2015	Víctor Manuelle	"Agua Bendita"	Que Suenen los Tambores	-	-	check	-
2015	Víctor Manuelle	"Agua Bendita (Versión Pop)"	Que Suenen los Tambores	-	-	check	-
2015	Natalia Jiménez	"Te Esperaré"	Creo en Mí	check	-	-	-
2015	ChocQuibTown	"El Mismo"	El Mismo	-	-	check	-
2015	ChocQuibTown	"Cuando Te Veo"	El Mismo	-	-	check	-
2015	ChocQuibTown	"Nadie Dijo"	El Mismo	-	-	check	-
2015	ChocQuibTown	"Desde el Día en Que Te Fuiste"	El Mismo	-	-	check	-
2015	ChocQuibTown	"El Arriendo"	El Mismo	-	-	check	-
2015	ChocQuibTown	"Salsa & Choke" (featuring Ñejo)	El Mismo	-	-	check	-
2015	ChocQuibTown	"No Te Espero Más"	El Mismo	-	-	check	-
2015	ChocQuibTown	"Una Raza Llamada Sabor"	El Mismo	-	-	check	-
2015	ChocQuibTown	"Tú"	El Mismo	-	-	check	-
2015	ChocQuibTown	"Ritmo Violento" (featuring Alexis Play)	El Mismo	-	-	check	-
2015	ChocQuibTown	"Nuqui (Te Quiero Para Mi)"	El Mismo	-	-	check	-
2015	ChocQuibTown	"Fiesta Animal" (featuring Notch)	El Mismo	-	-	check	-
2015	ChocQuibTown	"Nadie Nos Quita lo Baila'o"	El Mismo	-	-	check	-
2015	ChocQuibTown	"Cuando Te Veo (Pop Version)"	El Mismo	-	-	check	-
2015	ChocQuibTown	"Cuando Te Veo" (featuring Nicky Jam)	Non-album single	-	-	check	-
2015	Chino & Nacho	"Si Estoy Junto A Ti"	Radio Universo	check	-	check	-
2015	Anna Carina	"Amándote" (featuring Jandy Feliz)	Sola y Bien Acompañada	-	check	check	-
2015	Anna Carina	"Volver a Amar" (featuring Alkilados)	Sola y Bien Acompañada	-	check	check	-
2015	Anna Carina	"Hipocresía" (featuring Kalimba)	Sola y Bien Acompañada	-	check	check	-
2015	Anna Carina	"Me Voy Contigo" (featuring Trebol Clan)	Sola y Bien Acompañada	check	check	check	-
2015	Anna Carina	"No Me Arrepiento"	Sola y Bien Acompañada	-	check	check	-
2015	Anna Carina	"Te Quise Más Que a Nadie" (featuring Stephanie Cayo)	Sola y Bien Acompañada	-	check	check	-
2015	Anna Carina	"Me Voy Contigo"	Sola y Bien Acompañada	check	check	check	-
2015	Anna Carina	"Amándote (Sola)"	Sola y Bien Acompañada	-	check	check	-
2015	Anna Carina	"Hipocresía (Sola)"	Sola y Bien Acompañada	-	check	check	-
2015	Anna Carina	"Te Quise Más Que a Nadie (Sola)"	Sola y Bien Acompañada	-	check	check	-
2015	Anna Carina	"Volver a Amar (Sola)"	Sola y Bien Acompañada	-	check	check	-
2015	Leslie Grace	"Cómo Duele el Silencio"	Lloviendo Estrellas	check	-	-	-
2015	Leslie Grace	"Como Duele el Silencio (Banda Version)" featuring Luis Coronel	Cómo Duele el Silencio (Banda Versions)	check	-	-	-
2015	Leslie Grace	"Cómo Duele el Silencio (TV Banda-Bachata Version)" featuring Luis Coronel	Cómo Duele el Silencio (Banda Versions)	check	-	-	-
2015	Mister Chivo	"El Maniquí"	Raíces	-	check	check	-
2015	Mister Chivo	"Mi Viejo"	Raíces	-	check	check	-
2015	Mister Chivo	"Vamos a Darnos Tiempo"	Raíces	-	-	check	-
2015	Johnny Sky	"No One's Been as Close"	Johnny Sky	check	-	-	-
2015	Banda el Recodo	"Todo Tuyo"	Theme Song for Televisa Novela	check	check	check	-
2015	Banda el Recodo	"Las Fresas (Versión Banda)" (featuring Wisin)	Mi Vicio Más Grande	check	check	check	-
2015	Banda el Recodo	"Las Fresas (Versión Urban)" (featuring Wisin)	Mi Vicio Más Grande	check	-	check	-
2015	Luciano Pereyra	"Seré"	Tu Mano	-	check	check	-
2015	Luciano Pereyra	"Tu Dolor"	Tu Mano	check	check	check	-
2015	Luciano Pereyra	"No Te Puedo Olvidar" (featuring Descemer Bueno)	Tu Mano	-	check	check	-
2015	Luciano Pereyra	"Tu Mano"	Tu Mano	-	check	check	-
2015	Luciano Pereyra	"Justo Ahora"	Tu Mano	-	check	check	-
2015	Luciano Pereyra	"Cara o Cruz" (featuring David Bisbal)	Tu Mano	-	check	check	-
2015	Luciano Pereyra	"Eres Mi Vida"	Tu Mano	check	check	check	-
2015	Luciano Pereyra	"Enséñame a Vivir Sin Ti"	Tu Mano	check	check	check	-
2015	Luciano Pereyra	"Carnaval"	Tu Mano	check	check	check	-
2015	Luciano Pereyra	"Más Nada Que Tú"	Tu Mano	-	check	check	-
2015	Dvicio	"Nada [Inédita 2015]" (featuring Leslie Grace)	Justo Ahora y Siempre	-	-	check	-
2015	Christian Daniel	"Vine a Decir"	Renacer	check	check	check	-
2015	Christian Daniel	"Te Has Convertido En Mi"	Renacer	check	check	check	-
2015	Christian Daniel	"8 Pisos"	Renacer	check	check	check	-
2015	Christian Daniel	"Me Vuelvo un Cobarde"	Renacer	check	check	check	-
2015	Christian Daniel	"Seguro al Corazón"	Renacer	check	check	check	-
2015	Christian Daniel	"Quiero Quitarte El Miedo"	Renacer	check	check	check	-
2015	Christian Daniel	"Con Quién Hay Que Hablar"	Renacer	check	check	check	-
2015	Christian Daniel	"Rezo"	Renacer	-	check	check	-
2015	Christian Daniel	"Me Vuelvo un Cobarde (Versión Bachata)"	Renacer	check	-	check	-
2015	Christian Daniel	"Te Has Convertido En Mi (Versión Bachata)"	Renacer	check	-	check	-
2015	Maluma	"Sin Contrato"	Pretty Boy, Dirty Boy	check	check	check	-
2015	Maluma	"Tengo un Amor" (featuring Leslie Grace)	Pretty Boy, Dirty Boy	check	check	check	-
2015	Maluma	"Sin Contrato" (featuring Fifth Harmony	Non-album single	check	check	check	-
2016	Kevin Ortiz	"Vamos Portandonos Mal"	Mi Vicio, Mi Adiccion	check	-	-	-
2016	Rocío Dúrcal	"Si Nos Dejan" (featuring Leslie Grace)	Duetos	-	check	check	-
2016	Thalía	"De Ti" (featuring Silvestre Dangond)	Latina	check	check	check	-
2016	Anahí	"Me Despido"	Inesperado	check	-	-	-
2016	La Maquinaria Norteña	"Te Lo Digo En La Cara"	Generación Maquinaria Est. 2006	check	-	-	-
2016	Carlos Vives	"Volví a Nacer" (featuring Maluma)	Non-album single	-	check	-	-
2016	Samo	"Creer En Mí"	Eterno	check	check	check	-
2016	María José	"Habla Ahora"	Habla Ahora	check	-	-	-
2016	Aracely Arámbula	"La Doña"	Non-album single	check	check	check	-
2016	Silvestre Dangond	"Ya No Me Duele Más"	Non-album single	check	-	check	-
2016	Maluma	"Sin Contrato (Remix)" featuring Don Omar and Wisin	Non-album single	check	check	check	-
2016	Yordano	"Manantial de Corazón"	El Tren de los Regresos	-	-	check	-
2016	Banda El Recodo	"Vale La Pena"	Ayer Y Hoy	check	-	-	-
2016	Natalia Jiménez	"Ya Lo Sé"	Homenaje a La Gran Señora	-	check	check	-
2016	Natalia Jiménez	"De Contrabando"	Homenaje a La Gran Señora	-	check	check	-
2016	Natalia Jiménez	"Amiga Si Lo Ves"	Homenaje a La Gran Señora	-	check	check	-
2016	Natalia Jiménez	"Por Qué No Le Calas"	Homenaje a La Gran Señora	-	check	check	-
2016	Natalia Jiménez	"La Misma Gran Señora"	Homenaje a La Gran Señora	-	check	check	-
2016	Natalia Jiménez	"Chuper Amigos" (featuring Lupillo Rivera)	Homenaje a La Gran Señora	-	check	check	-
2016	Natalia Jiménez	"Mirame"	Homenaje a La Gran Señora	-	check	check	-
2016	Natalia Jiménez	"No Llega el Olvido"	Homenaje a La Gran Señora	-	check	check	-
2016	Natalia Jiménez	"Tu Camisa Puesta"	Homenaje a La Gran Señora	-	check	check	-
2016	Natalia Jiménez	"Inolvidable"	Homenaje a La Gran Señora	-	check	check	-
2016	Natalia Jiménez	"Querida Socia"	Homenaje a La Gran Señora	-	check	check	-
2016	Natalia Jiménez	"Ovarios" (featuring Chiquis Rivera)	Homenaje a La Gran Señora	check	check	check	-
2017	Banda MS	"El Bien Amado"	Theme Song for Televisa Novela	check	-	-	-
2017	Silvestre Dangond	"Ya No Me Duele Más"	Gente Valiente	check	-	check	-
2017	Silvestre Dangond	"Lo Que a Mí Me Gusta"	Gente Valiente	check	-	check	-
2017	Silvestre Dangond	"Somos Culpables"	Gente Valiente	check	-	check	-
2017	Chiquis Rivera	"Vas a Volver"	Entre Botellas	check	check	check	-
2017	Los Huracanes Del Norte	"Diez Minutos Mas"	Alma Bohemia	check	-	-	-
2017	Los Huracanes Del Norte	"Un Valiente De Villa"	Alma Bohemia	check	-	-	-
2017	CNCO	"Hey DJ (Pop Version)"	Non-album single	check	check	check	-
2017	CNCO and Yandel	"Hey DJ"	CNCO	check	check	check	-
2017	Banda Los Recoditos	"Fuego Cruzado"	Los Gustos Que Me Doy	check	-	-	-
2017	Various Artists	"Ángel Con Colmillos"	Guerra de Ídolos (Banda Sonora Original)	check	-	-	-
2017	Various Artists	"Fuego Cruzado"	Guerra de Ídolos (Banda Sonora Original)	check	-	-	-
2017	Various Artists	"La Protagonista"	Guerra de Ídolos (Banda Sonora Original)	check	-	-	-
2017	Various Artists	"Amor y Desamor"	Guerra de Ídolos (Banda Sonora Original)	check	-	-	-
2017	Various Artists	"Despertar"	Guerra de Ídolos (Banda Sonora Original)	check	-	-	-
2017	Various Artists	"Hasta el Mariachi Va a Llorar"	Guerra de Ídolos (Banda Sonora Original)	check	-	-	-
2017	Various Artists	"Que Pase la Siguiente"	Guerra de Ídolos (Banda Sonora Original)	check	-	-	-
2017	Various Artists	"Va a Dolerte Más Que a Mí"	Guerra de Ídolos (Banda Sonora Original)	check	-	-	-
2017	Various Artists	"Me Gustas"	Guerra de Ídolos (Banda Sonora Original)	check	-	-	-
2017	Various Artists	"No Es Normal"	Guerra de Ídolos (Banda Sonora Original)	check	-	-	-
2017	Various Artists	"El Diplomático"	Guerra de Ídolos (Banda Sonora Original)	check	-	-	-
2017	Various Artists	"En Plena Oscuridad"	Guerra de Ídolos (Banda Sonora Original)	check	-	-	-
2017	Various Artists	"Pasa la Página"	Guerra de Ídolos (Banda Sonora Original)	check	-	-	-
2017	Various Artists	"No Perdamos Tiempo"	Guerra de Ídolos (Banda Sonora Original)	check	-	-	-
2017	Various Artists	Sin Ti Yo Estoy Mejor	Guerra de Ídolos (Banda Sonora Original)	check	-	-	-
2017	Chiquis Rivera	"Horas Extras"	Entre Botellas	-	check	check	-
2017	Samo	"Cara O Cruz"	Eterno	check	-	-	-
2017	Samo	"Te Juro" (with Alejandra Guzmán)	Eterno	-	-	check	-
2017	Samo	"Por Ti"	Eterno	check	-	-	-
2017	Samo	"Creer En Mí"	Eterno	check	check	check	-
2017	ChocQuibTown	"Hasta que Amanezca"	Non-album single	-	check	check	-
2017	Banda El Recodo	"Me Prometí Olvidarte"	Ayer Y Hoy	check	-	-	-
2017	Banda El Recodo	"Vale La Pena"	Ayer Y Hoy	check	-	-	-
2017	Banda El Recodo	"Íntimamente"	Ayer Y Hoy	check	-	-	-
2017	Jonatan Sanchez	"No Hay Problema"	Necesito una Compañera	check	-	-	-
2017	Yuri	"El Espejo"	Primera Fila (En Vivo)	-	check	check	-
2017	Yuri	"Déjala"	Primera Fila (En Vivo)	-	check	check	-
2017	Yuri	"Esperanzas" (featuring Mijares)	Primera Fila (En Vivo)	-	check	check	-
2017	Yuri	"Es Ella Más Que Yo"	Primera Fila (En Vivo)	-	check	check	-
2017	Yuri	"Ya No Vives En Mí" (featuring Carlos Rivera)	Primera Fila (En Vivo)	-	check	check	-
2017	Yuri	"Yo Te Pido Amor" (featuring Pandora)	Primera Fila (En Vivo)	-	check	check	-
2017	Yuri	"Amiga Mía"	Primera Fila (En Vivo)	-	check	check	-
2017	Yuri	"Perdón"	Primera Fila (En Vivo)	-	check	check	-
2017	Yuri	"Cuando Baja la Marea"	Primera Fila (En Vivo)	-	check	check	-
2017	Yuri	"¿Cómo Le Hacemos?" (featuring Matisse)	Primera Fila (En Vivo)	-	check	check	-
2017	Yuri	"Maldita Primavera"	Primera Fila (En Vivo)	-	check	check	-
2017	Yuri	"¿Y Tú Cómo Estás?"	Primera Fila (En Vivo)	-	check	check	-
2017	Yuri	"Detrás de Mi Ventana"	Primera Fila (En Vivo)	-	check	check	-
2017	Yuri	"La Vida Es una Sola"	Primera Fila (En Vivo)	-	check	check	-
2017	Yuri	"No Tengo Dinero (featuring Carlos Vives)"	Primera Fila (En Vivo)	-	check	check	-
2017	Yuri	"Tan Cerquita"	Primera Fila (En Vivo)	-	check	check	-
2017	Yuri	"Medley"	Primera Fila (En Vivo)	-	check	check	-
2017	Abraham Mateo, Farruko and Christian Daniel	"Loco Enamorado"	A Cámara Lenta	check	-	-	-
2017	Abraham Mateo, 50 Cent and Austin Mahone	"Háblame Bajito"	A Cámara Lenta	check	-	-	-
2017	Gloria Trevi and Alejandra Guzmán	"Más Buena"	Versus	check	-	-	-
2017	Gloria Trevi and Alejandra Guzmán	"Más Buena (Remix)"	Versus	check	-	-	-
2017	Gloria Trevi and Alejandra Guzmán	"Esta Si Va Para Ti"	Versus	check	-	-	-
2017	Bomba Estéreo	"Internacionales"	Ayo	check	check	-	-
2017	Joey Montana and Sebastián Yatra	"Suena El Dembow"	La Movida	check	-	-	-
2017	Los De La Noria	"¿Por Qué Tuviste Que Marcharte?"	Desde Que La Vi	check	-	-	-
2017	Cheyo Carrillo	"Me Vuelvo Un Cobarde"	No Es Normal	check	-	-	-
2017	Luis Coronel	"La Canción Perfecta"	Ahora Soy Yo	check	check	check	-
2017	Luis Coronel	"Eres (Mi Bella Fan)"	Ahora Soy Yo	check	check	check	-
2017	Luis Coronel	"Para No Accordarme de Ella"	Ahora Soy Yo	check	check	check	-
2017	Mario Bautista and De la Ghetto	"#Maldeamores"	Brindo con Tequila	check	-	-	-
2017	Carlos Vives	"Hoy Tengo Tiempo"	Vives	-	-	check	-
2017	Carlos Vives	"El Sofá"	Vives	-	-	check	-
2017	Carlos Vives	"La Preferida"	Vives	-	-	check	-
2017	Carlos Vives	"Pescaíto"	Vives	-	-	check	-
2017	Carlos Vives	"La Tierra Prometida"	Vives	-	-	check	-
2017	Carlos Vives	"El Sombrero de Alejo"	Vives	-	-	check	-
2017	Carlos Vives	"Vivir Contigo"	Vives	-	-	check	-
2017	Carlos Vives	"Mañana"	Vives	-	-	check	-
2017	Carlos Vives	"El Orgullo de Mi Patria"	Vives	-	-	check	-
2017	Carlos Vives	"Nuestro Secreto"	Vives	-	-	check	-
2017	Carlos Vives	"Los Niños Olvidados" (featuring Cynthia Montaño)	Vives	-	-	check	-
2017	Carlos Vives	"La Mujer en la Ventana"	Vives	-	-	check	-
2017	Carlos Vives	"Monsieur Bigoté" (featuring Elena Vives and Río Grande Music School Chorus)	Vives	-	-	check	-
2017	Ha*Ash	"Eso No Va a Suceder"	30 de Febrero	check	check	check	-
2017	Ha*Ash	"Llueve Sobre Mojado"	30 de Febrero	check	check	check	-
2017	Ha*Ash	"Extraños"	30 de Febrero	-	check	check	-
2017	Ha*Ash	"No Me Importa"	30 de Febrero	check	-	-	-
2017	Mister Chivo	"Me Voy a Celebrar"	Así Somos	check	check	check	-
2018	Reykon	"Mala"	Non-album single	check	-	-	-
2018	Reykon	"Mala (Salsa Remix)" (featuring Víctor Manuelle)	Non-album single	check	-	-	-
2018	Reykon	"Mala (Remix)" (featuring Nio Garcia and Casper Mágico)	Non-album single	check	-	-	-
2018	Jason Derulo	"Colors"	Non-album single	check	-	-	-
2018	Jason Derulo and Maluma	"Colors"	Non-album single	check	-	check	-
2018	Chiquis Rivera	"Vas a Volver"	Entre Botellas	check	check	check	-
2018	Chiquis Rivera	"Horas Extras"	Entre Botellas	-	check	check	-
2018	Chiquis Rivera	"Los Chismes" (featuring Lorenzo Mendez)	Entre Botellas	-	check	check	-
2018	Chiquis Rivera	"Estamos A Mano"	Entre Botellas	-	check	check	-
2018	Chiquis Rivera	"Cuanto Te Debo?"	Entre Botellas	-	check	check	-
2018	Chiquis Rivera	"Que Sacrificio"	Entre Botellas	-	check	check	-
2018	Chiquis Rivera	"Lo Que La Vida Me Enseño"	Entre Botellas	-	check	check	-
2018	Chiquis Rivera	"Entre Botellas"	Entre Botellas	-	check	check	-
2018	Chiquis Rivera	"Gracias A Dios" (featuring Juan Rivera)	Entre Botellas	-	check	check	-
2018	Chiquis Rivera and Jenni Rivera	"Quisieran Tener Mi Lugar"	Entre Botellas	-	check	check	-
2018	Joey Montana and Sebastián Yatra	"Suena El Dembow (Remix)" (featuring Alexis y Fido)	Non-album single	check	-	-	-
2018	Prince Royce	"El Clavo"	Alter Ego	check	check	check	-
2018	Prince Royce	"El Clavo (Remix)" (featuring Maluma	Alter Ego	check	check	check	-
2018	Play-N-Skillz	"Cuidao" (featuring Yandel and Messiah)	Non-album single	check	-	-	-
2018	CD9	"Prohibido"	1.0	check	-	-	-
2018	CD9	"Prohibido (Remix)" (featuring Lali and Ana Mena	Non-album single	check	-	-	-
2018	Jennifer Lopez	"El Anillo"	Non-album single	check	check	check	-
2018	Jacob Forever	"Yo Quiero (Finale Version)"	Overboard (Original Motion Picture Soundtrack)	-	check	check	-
2018	Prince Royce	"90 Minutos (Futbol Mode)" (featuring ChocQuibTown)	Non-album single	check	check	check	-
2018	Maluma	"Intro - F.A.M.E."	F.A.M.E.	check	check	check	check
2018	Maluma	"El Préstamo"	F.A.M.E.	check	check	check	check
2018	Maluma	"Cuenta a Saldo"	F.A.M.E.	check	check	check	check
2018	Maluma	"Hangover" (featuring Prince Royce)	F.A.M.E.	check	check	check	check
2018	Maluma	"Mi Declaración" (featuring Timbaland & Sid)	F.A.M.E.	check	check	check	check
2018	Maluma	"How I Like It"	F.A.M.E.	check	-	check	check
2018	Maluma	"Marinero"	F.A.M.E.	check	check	check	check
2018	Maluma	"Delincuente"	F.A.M.E.	check	-	check	check
2018	Maluma	"Condena"	F.A.M.E.	check	-	check	check
2018	Maluma	"Ojos Que No Ven"	F.A.M.E.	check	check	check	check
2018	Maluma	"Unfollow"	F.A.M.E.	check	-	check	check
2018	Shakira and Maluma	"Clandestino"	Non-album single	check	check	check	-
2018	Gemeliers	"Ella Es de las Mías"	Stereo	check	-	-	-
2018	Pipe Bueno	"Confesión"	Non-album single	check	check	check	-
2018	Sebastián Yatra and Mau y Ricky	"Ya No Tiene Novio"	Para Aventuras y Curiosidades	check	-	-	-
2018	Maluma	"Mala Mía"	Non-album single	check	-	check	check
2018	Maluma, Becky G and Anitta	"Mala Mía (Remix)"	Non-album single	check	-	check	check
2018	Hermanos Vega Jr.	"Y Si Algún Día" (featuring Beto Zapata)	Non-album single	check	-	-	-
2018	Gianluca Vacchi and Luis Fonsi	"Sigamos Bailando" (featuring Yandel)	Non-album single	check	-	-	-
2018	Christian Nodal	"No Te Contaron Mal"	Ahora	check	-	check	-
2018	Felipe Peláez and Nacho & Noriel	"No Te Creo"	Ponle Actitud	check	-	-	-
2018	Gloria Trevi	"Me Lloras" (featuring Charly Black)	Non-album single	check	-	-	-
2018	XXXTentacion and Lil Pump	"Arms Around You" (featuring Maluma and Swae Lee	Non-album single	check	-	check	-
2018	Fonseca	"Como Enamoraban Antes"	Agustín	check	check	check	-
2018	Fonseca	"Que Se Vaya Contigo" (featuring Kinky)	Agustín	check	check	check	-
2018	Thalía	"Lento" (featuring Gente de Zona)	Valiente	check	-	-	-
2018	Thalía and Lali	"Lindo Pero Bruto"	Valiente	check	-	-	-
2018	CNCO, Meghan Trainor and Sean Paul	"Hey DJ (Remix)"	Non-album single	check	check	check	-
2018	Wisin & Yandel and Maluma	"La Luz"	Los Campeones del Pueblo	check	-	check	-
2019	Silvestre Dangond and Maluma	"Vivir Bailando"	Non-album single	check	-	check	-
2019	Fanny Lu	"Cosas Bonitas"	Non-album single	check	-	check	-
2019	Leslie Shaw and Mau y Ricky	"Faldita"	Non-album single	check	-	-	-
2019	Gloria Trevi and Karol G	"Hijoepu*#"	Diosa de la Noche	check	-	-	-
2019	Camilo	"No Te Vayas"	Por Primera Vez	check	-	-	-
2019	Sebastián Yatra	"En Guerra" (featuring Camilo)	Fantasía	check	-	-	-
2019	Sebastián Yatra	"Yo Te Extraño"	Fantasía	check	-	-	-
2019	Becky G and Maluma	"La Respuesta"	Non-album single	check	check	check	-
2019	Marc Anthony	"Parecen Viernes"	Opus	check	-	-	-
2019	Alta Consigna	"Pude Olvidarte"	Non-album single	check	-	-	-
2019	Christian Nodal	"Que Te Olvide"	Ahora	check	-	check	-
2019	Christian Nodal	"No Te Contaron Mal"	Ahora	check	-	check	-
2019	Christian Nodal	"Para Olvidarme"	Ahora	check	-	check	-
2019	Christian Nodal	"Si Te Falta Alguien"	Ahora	check	-	check	-
2019	Christian Nodal	"Nada Nuevo"	Ahora	check	-	check	-
2019	Christian Nodal	"Esta Noche" (featuring Sebastián Yatra)	Ahora	check	-	check	-
2019	Christian Nodal	"Perdóname"	Ahora	check	-	check	-
2019	Christian Nodal	"De Los Besos Que Te Di"	Ahora	check	-	check	-
2019	Maluma	"11 PM"	11:11	check	check	check	check
2019	Maluma	"HP"	11:11	check	check	check	check
2019	Maluma	"No Se Me Quita" (featuring Ricky Martin)	11:11	check	check	check	check
2019	Maluma	"Dispuesto" (featuring Ozuna)	11:11	check	check	check	check
2019	Maluma	"No Puedo Olvidarte" (featuring Nicky Jam)	11:11	check	check	check	check
2019	Maluma	"Me Enamoré de Ti"	11:11	check	check	check	check
2019	Maluma	"Extrañándote" (featuring Zion & Lennox)	11:11	check	check	check	check
2019	Maluma	"Shhh (Calla')"	11:11	check	check	check	check
2019	Maluma	"Dinero Tiene Cualquiera"	11:11	check	check	check	check
2019	Maluma	"Soltera" (featuring Madonna)	11:11	check	check	check	check
2019	Maluma	"Te Quiero"	11:11	check	check	check	check
2019	Maluma	"Instinto Natural" (featuring Sech)	11:11	check	check	check	check
2019	Maluma	"Tu Vecina" (featuring Ty Dolla Sign)	11:11	check		check	check
2019	Maluma	"La Flaca" (featuring Chencho)	11:11	check	check	check	check
2019	Maluma	"Puesto Pa' Ti" (featuring Farina)	11:11	check	check	check	check
2019	Maluma	"Déjale Saber"	11:11	check	check	check	check
2019	Gente de Zona	"Tan Buena" (featuring Mau y Ricky	Otra Cosa	check	check	check	-
2019	Madonna and Maluma	"Medellín"	Madame X	check	-	check	-
2019	Madonna	"Bitch I'm Loca" (featuring Maluma)	Madame X	check	-	check	-
2019	Banda Los Recoditos	"Elegiste un Error"	Perfecta	check	-	-	-
2019	Ariana Grande and Social House	"Boyfriend"	Everything Changed...	check	check	-	-
2019	Piso 21 and Christian Nodal	"Pa' Olvidarme De Ella"	Non-album single	check	check	check	-
2019	Maluma and J Balvin	"Qué Pena"	Non-album single	check	check	check	check
2019	CNCO	"Ya Tú Sabes" (featuring Orishas)	Que Quiénes Somoms	check	check	-	-
2019	Becky G	"Mejor Así" (featuring Darell	Mala Santa	check	-	-	-
2019	Becky G	"Me Acostumbré" (featuring Mau y Ricky)	Mala Santa	check	-	-	-
2019	India Martínez	"Palmeras" (featuring Orishas)	Palmeras	check	-	-	-
2019	Pablo Alborán and Ava Max	"Tabú"	Tabú	-	check	check	-
2019	Juanes and Christian Nodal	"Tequila"	Más futuro que pasado	check	-	check	-
2019	Paulina Rubio	"De Qué Sirve"	Non-album single	check	check	check	-
2019	Myke Towers, Farruko and Maluma	"La Playa (Remix)"	Non-album single	check	-	check	-

=== 2020s ===
Year	Artist	Song	Album	Songwriter	Producer	Recording Engineer	Executive Producer
2020	Shakira and Anuel AA	"Me Gusta"	Non-album single	check	check	check	-
2020	Thalía and Mau y Ricky	"Ya Tú Me Conoces"	Desamorfosis	check	check	check	-
2020	Alejandro Fernández and Christian Nodal	"Más No Puedo"	Hecho en México	check	-	check	-
2020	Banda Los Recoditos and Banda Los Sebastianes	"Mujer Moderna"	Vivir La Vida and ¡Ay Dolor!	check	-	-	-
2020	Mau y Ricky	"Me Enamora"	Non-album single	check	check	-	-
2020	PK, Becky G and Gabily	"Funk Total: Vai Danada"	Non-album single	check	-	-	-
2020	Camilo	"Favorito"	Por Primera Vez	check	check	check	-
2020	Camilo	"El Mismo Aire"	Por Primera Vez	check	-	check	-
2020	Camilo	"La Mitad" (featuring Christian Nodal)	Por Primera Vez	check	check	check	-
2020	Camilo	"No Te Vayas"	Por Primera Vez	check	-	-	-
2020	Camilo	"La Difícil"	Por Primera Vez	check	-	-	-
2020	Camilo and Pablo Alborán	"El Mismo Aire"	Non-album single	check	-	check	-
2020	Luis Coronel	"Me Faltaba Tiempo"	Una Historia Más	check	check	check	-
2020	Luis Coronel	"Solo un Poquito"	Una Historia Más	check	check	check	-
2020	Christian Nodal	"AYAYAY!"	Ayayay!	-	check	check	-
2020	Christian Nodal	"Mi Chula"	Ayayay!	check	check	check	-
2020	Christian Nodal	"Se Me Olvidó"	Ayayay!	check	check	check	-
2020	Christian Nodal	"Ojalá Fuera Cierto"	Ayayay!	check	check	check	-
2020	Christian Nodal	"No Es Justo X Él"	Ayayay!	check	check	check	-
2020	Christian Nodal	"Aquí Abajo"	Ayayay!	check	check	check	-
2020	Christian Nodal	"Amor Tóxico"	Ayayay!	check	check	check	-
2020	Christian Nodal	"Mamacita"	Ayayay!	check	check	check	-
2020	Christian Nodal	"Aquí Sigo Tras De Ti"	Ayayay!	check	check	check	-
2020	Christian Nodal	"Solo Un Sueño"	Ayayay!	-	check	check	-
2020	Christian Nodal	"Nace Un Borracho"	Ayayay!	check	check	check	-
2020	Christian Nodal	"Mi Ex"	Ayayay!	check	check	check	-
2020	Christian Nodal	"Venganza Cumplida"	Ayayay!	check	check	check	-
2020	Christian Nodal	"Anoche Me Enamoré"	Ayayay!	-	check	check	-
2020	Christian Nodal and Ángela Aguilar	"Dime Cómo Quieres"	Ayayay!	check	check	check	-
2020	Banda Los Sebastianes	"Tu Mero Mero"	La Vida es un Trago	check	-	-	-
2020	Banda Los Sebastianes	"Olvidarte No Es Lo Mío"	La Vida es un Trago	check	-	-	-
2020	Aya Nakamura	"Djadja (Remix)" (featuring Maluma)	Non-album single	check	-	check	-
2020	Sofía Reyes and Piso 21	"Cuando Estás Tú"	Mal De Amores	check	-	-	-
2020	Abraham Mateo	"No Te Imaginas"	Sigo a Lo Mío	check	-	-	-
2020	Becky G	"My Man"	Non-album single	check	-	-	-
2020	Reykon	"Kiss (El Último Beso) (featuring Kapla y Miky)"	Non-album single	check	-	-	-
2020	Maluma	"Hawái"	Papi Juancho	check	-	check	check
2020	Maluma	"Madrid" (featuring Myke Towers)	Papi Juancho	check	-	-	-
2020	Maluma	"Me Acuerdo de Ti" (featuring Darell)	Papi Juancho	check	-	check	-
2020	Maluma	"Quality"	Papi Juancho	check	check	check	-
2020	Maluma	ADMV	Papi Juancho	check	check	check	check
2020	Jennifer Lopez & Maluma	"Pa' Ti"	Marry Me	check	check	check	-
2020	Paloma Mami	"For Ya"	Sueños de Dalí	check	-	-	-
2020	Carlos Rivera & Maluma	"100 Años"	Non-album single	check	check	check	check
2020	La Addictiva Banda San Jose de Mesillas	"Llamada Perdida"	30 Aniversario	check	-	-	-
2020	Banda Los Sebastianes	"Debí"	¡Ay Dolor!	check	-	-	-
2020	Mau y Ricky	"La Moto"	Rifresh	check	-	-	-
2020	Reik & Christian Nodal	"Poco"	Non-album single	check	check	check	-
2020	Matisse & ChocQuibTown	"Nada"	Tres	check	-	-	-
2020	Piso 21 & Maluma	"Más de la Una"	Non-album single	check	-	check	-
2020	Daddy Yankee & Marc Anthony	"De Vuelta Pa' la Vuelta"	Non-album single	check	-	check	-
2020	Jay Wheeler, Myke Towers & Becky G	"La Curiosidad (Blue Grand Prix Remix" (featuring DJ Nelson, Arcangel, Zion & Lennox, De La Ghetto and Brray)	Non-album single	check	-	-	-
2021	Carlos Rivera, Maluma & Calibre 50	"100 Años"	Non-album single	check	-	check	-
2021	Maluma	"Tónika" (featuring Ziggy Marley)	#7DJ (7 Días En Jamaica)	check	check	check	check
2021	Maluma	"Love" (featuring Charly Black)	#7DJ (7 Días En Jamaica)	check	check	check	check
2021	Maluma	"Chocolate"	#7DJ (7 Días En Jamaica)	check	check	check	check
2021	Maluma	"Agua de Jamaica"	#7DJ (7 Días En Jamaica)	check	check	check	check
2021	Maluma	"Desayun-Arte"	#7DJ (7 Días En Jamaica)	check	check	check	check
2021	Maluma	"La Burbuja"	#7DJ (7 Días En Jamaica)	check	check	check	check
2021	Maluma	"Peligrosa"	#7DJ (7 Días En Jamaica)	check	check	check	check
2021	Banda Los Recoditos	"Llorando En Un Carro Del Año"	Me Siento A Todo Dar	check	-	-	-
2021	Banda Los Recoditos	"Celoso Enamorado"	Me Siento A Todo Dar	check	-	-	-
2021	Selena Gomez & Rauw Alejandro	"Baila Conmigo"	Revelación	check	-	-	-
2021	Camilo	"Millones"	Mis Manos	check	check	check	-
2021	Camilo	"Kesi"	Mis Manos	check	check	check	-
2021	Camilo	"Manos de Tijera"	Mis Manos	check	check	check	-
2021	Camilo	"Mareado"	Mis Manos	check	check	check	-
2021	Camilo	"Ropa Cara"	Mis Manos	check	check	check	-
2021	Camilo	"Vida de Rico"	Mis Manos	check	check	check	-
2021	Camilo & Los Dos Carnales	"Tuyo y Mío"	Mis Manos	check	check	check	-
2021	Camilo & Evaluna	"Machu Picchu"	Mis Manos	check	check	check	-
2021	Camilo & El Alfa	"BEBÉ"	Mis Manos	check	check	check	-
2021	Dalex	"Feeling"	Unisex	check	-	-	-
2021	Manuel Turizo & Maluma	"Amor En Coma"	Dopamina	check	check	check	-
2021	Maluma	"Rumba (Puro Oro Anthem)"	Non-album single	check	check	check	-
2021	Gera MX & Christian Nodal	"Botella Tras Botella"	Non-album single	check	check	check	-
2021	Los Dos Carnales	"La Pregunta del Millón"	Boleros de Hoy	check	-	-	-
2021	Lele Pons	"Al Lau"	Non-album single	check	-	-	-
2021	Thalía	"Eres Mío"	Desamorfosis	check	check	check	-
2021	Thalía & Banda MS de Sergio Lizárraga	"Tu Boca"	Desamorfosis	check	check	check	-
2021	Los Plebes del Rancho de Ariel Camacho & Christian Nodal	"2 Veces"	Recordando A Una Leyenda	check	-	check	-
2021	Reik & Maluma	"Perfecta"	Non-album single	check	check	check	-
2021	Christian Nodal & Banda MS de Sergio Lizárraga	"La Sinvergüenza"	Forajido	check	-	check	-
2021	Maluma	"Sobrio"	Don Juan	check	check	check	-
2021	Camilo & Shawn Mendes	"Kesi (Remix)"	Non-album single	check	check	check	-
2021	Alejandro Fernández & Christian Nodal	"Duele"	Hecho en México	check	-	check	-
2021	Sebastián Yatra & Jhayco	"Delincuente"	Non-album single	check	-	-	-
2021	Grupo Firme	"Ya Supérame"	Non-album single	check	-	-	-
2021	Selena Gomez & Camilo	"999"	Non-album single	check	check	-	-
2021	Matisse & Carin Leon	"Como Lo Hice Yo"	Así de Enamorados	check	-	-	-
2021	Natti Natasha & Maluma	"Imposible Amor"	Nattividad	check	check	check	-
2021	Natti Natasha	"Noches en Miami"	Nattividad	check	check	check	-
2021	Natti Natasha	"Hablando de Mí"	Nattividad	check	check	check	-
2021	Megan Thee Stallion, Maluma & Rock Mafia	"Crazy Family"	The Addams Family 2 (Original Motion Picture Soundtrack)	check	-	check	-
2021	Camila Cabello, Myke Towers & Tainy	"Oh Na Na"	Non-album single	check	-	-	-
2021	Los Ángeles Azules & Nicki Nicole	"Otra Noche"	Non-album single	check	-	-	-
2021	Grupo Firme & Maluma	"Cada Quien"	Non-album single	check	check	check	-
2021	Camilo	"Pesadilla"	De Adentro Pa Afuera	check	check	check	-
2021	Camilo & Evaluna Montaner	"Índigo"	De Adentro Pa Afuera	check	check	-	-
2022	Banda MS de Sergio Lizárraga & Carin Leon	"Ojos Cerrados"	Non-album single	check	-	-	-
2022	Jennifer Lopez & Maluma	"Marry Me"	Marry Me	check	-	-	-
2022	Jennifer Lopez & Maluma	"Marry Me (Ballad)"	Marry Me	check	-	-	-
2022	Maluma	"1 en 1 Millón"	Marry Me	check	check	check	-
2022	Maluma	"Segundo"	Marry Me	check	check	check	-
2022	Alex Luna, DAAZ & Christian Nodal	"Te Marqué Pedo (Remix)"	Non-album single	check	check	check	check
2022	Ovi & Kim Loaiza	"Después De Las 12"	Non-album single	check	-	-	-
2022	Ovi, Kim Loaiza, Grupo Firme & Pailita	"Después De Las 12 (Remix)"	Non-album single	check	-	-	-
2022	Ricardo Montaner	"Te Echo de Menos"	Non-album single	check	-	-	-
2022	J Balvin	"Niño Soñador"	Non-album single	check	check	-	-
2022	Marc Anthony	"Yo Le Mentí"	Pa'lla Voy	check	-	-	-
2022	Nathan Galante	"Como Antes"	Non-album single	-	check	-	check
2022	ChocQuibTown	"Bitcoin"	Non-album single	check	-	-	-
2022	Camila Cabello	"Celia"	Familia	check	-	-	-
2022	Camila Cabello	"Bam Bam" (featuring Ed Sheeran)	Familia	check	check	-	-
2022	Camila Cabello	"La Buena Vida"	Familia	check	-	-	-
2022	Camila Cabello & María Becerra	"Hasta los Dientes"	Familia	check	-	-	-
2022	Marca MP & Becky G	"Ya Acabó"	DEV, Vol. 2	check	check	-	-
2022	Becky G & Guaynaa	"Tajin"	Esquemas	check	check	check	-
2022	Manuel Turizo	"La Bachata"	2000	check	check	-	-
2022	Christian Nodal	"Ya No Somos Ni Seremos"	Forajido	check	-	check	-
2022	Christian Nodal	"Vivo en el 6"	Forajido	check	-	check	-
2022	Christian Nodal	"Limón con Sal"	Forajido	check	-	check	-
2022	Christian Nodal	"Aguardiente"	Forajido	check	-	check	-
2022	Christian Nodal	"El Karma"	Forajido	check	-	check	-
2022	Kany García	"Pájaro Herido"	El Amor Que Merecemos	check	-	-	-
2022	Christina Aguilera	"Te Deseo lo Mejor"	Aguilera	check	check	-	-
2022	Christina Aguilera	"No Es Que Te Extrañe"	Aguilera	check	-	-	-
2022	Dímelo Flow, Reik & Jhay Wheeler	"Winnie Pooh" (featuring Boza)	Always Dream	check	check	-	-
2022	Dímelo Flow, Piso 21 & Boza	"Chimba"	Always Dream	check	check	-	-
2022	Dímelo Flow, Messiah & BCA	"Minuto 90" (featuring Goyo)	Always Dream	check	check	-	-
2022	Maluma	"Cosita de la USA"	The Love & Sex Tape	check	-	-	-
2022	Maluma	"Tsunami" (featuring Arcángel & De La Ghetto)	The Love & Sex Tape	check	-	-	-
2022	Maluma	"La Vida es Bella"	The Love & Sex Tape	check	-	-	-
2022	Maluma	"Happy Birthday"	The Love & Sex Tape	check	-	-	-
2022	Prince Royce, Nicky Jam & Jay Wheeler	"Si Te Preguntan…"	Non-album single	check	-	-	-
2022	Chayanne	"Te Amo y Punto"	Bailemos Otra Vez	check	-	-	-
2022	Neeus	"Tu Negro y Mi Algo"	Non-album single	check	check	check	check
2022	Hans Zimmer and Camila Cabello	"Take Me Back Home"	Frozen Planet II	check	-	-	-
2022	Reik & Sech	"5 Estrellas"	Non-album single	check	check	check	check
2022	CNCO	"La Equivocada"	XOXO	check	check	check	-
2022	CNCO & Adriel Favela	"La Equivocada (Versión Tumbado)"	XOXO	check	-	check	-
2022	Ha*Ash & Kenia Os	"Ojos Cerrados"	Haashtag	check	-	-	-
2022	Romeo Santos & Christian Nodal	"Me Extraño"	Fórmula, Vol. 3	check	check	check	-
2022	Fuerza Regida & Grupo Frontera	"911"	Non-album single	check	check	-	check
2022	Camilo	"Aeropuerto"	De Adentro Pa Afuera	check	check	-	-
2022	Camilo	"5:24"	De Adentro Pa Afuera	check	check	-	-
2022	Camilo	"De Adentro Pa Afuera"	De Adentro Pa Afuera	check	check	-	-
2022	Camilo	"Pegao"	De Adentro Pa Afuera	check	check	-	-
2022	Camilo & Camila Cabello	"Ambulancia"	De Adentro Pa Afuera	check	check	-	-
2022	Camilo & Myke Towers	"Bebiendo Sola"	De Adentro Pa Afuera	check	check	-	-
2022	Camilo & Grupo Firme	"Alaska"	De Adentro Pa Afuera	check	check	-	-
2022	Camilo & Alejandro Sanz	"NASA"	De Adentro Pa Afuera	check	check	-	-
2022	Ozuna	"La Copa"	OzuTochi	check	check	-	-
2022	Kany García & Christian Nodal	"La Siguiente"	Non-album single	check	-	-	-
2022	Maluma	"Junio"	Don Juan	check	check	check	check
2022	Justin Quiles & Carin Leon	"La Esquina del Mall"	Non-album single	check	check	check	-
2022	Silvestre Dangond, Reik & Boza	"Sé Que Estás Con Él"	Intruso	check	-	-	-
2022	Eden Muñoz	"Ni Volviendo a Nacer"	Consejos Gratis	check	-	-	-
2022	Rels B	"pa quererte"	Non-album single	check	check	-	-
2022	Banda MS de Sergio Lizárraga	"Labios Resecos"	Punto y Aparte	check	-	-	-
2022	Carin Leon & Grupo Frontera	"Que Vuelvas"	El Comienzo	check	check	-	check
2022	Grupo Frontera	"Falsa Alarma"	Puras Pa' Pistear	check	-	-	-
2022	Fuerza Regida & Grupo Frontera	"Bebe Dame"	Sigan Hablando	check	check	-	check
2023	Rels B	"yo pr1mero"	Non-album single	check	-	-	-
2023	Grupo Frontera & Marca Registrada	"Di Que Sí"	Non-album single	check	check	-	check
2023	Fuerza Regida & Becky G	"Te Quiero Besar"	Non-album single	check	check	-	-
2023	Karol G	"Gucci los Paños"	Mañana Será Bonito	check	check	check	-
2023	Marshmello & Manuel Turizo	"El Merengue"	Sugar Papi	check	check	-	-
2023	Marshmello & Tiago PZK	"Como Yo :("	Sugar Papi	check	check	-	-
2023	Luis R. Conriquez & Grupo Frontera	"Dame Un Chance"	Non-album single	check	check	-	check
2023	Ozuna, Juanka & Brray	"La Single"	Non-album single	check	-	-	-
2023	Ricardo Montaner & Carlos Rivera	"Yo No Fumo"	Non-album single	check	-	-	-
2023	Eslabon Armado & Grupo Frontera	"Quédate Conmigo"	Desvelado	check	check	-	-
2023	Chesca	"Que Te Vaya Bien"	Non-album single	check	check	-	-
2023	Nicky Jam & Feid	"69"	Non-album single	check	check	-	-
2023	Christian Nodal & Tini	"Por el Resto de Tu Vida"	Forajido 2	check	check	check	-
2023	Christian Nodal	"Un Cumbión Dolido"	Forajido 2	check	-	-	-
2023	Christian Nodal	"La Despedida"	Forajido 2	check	-	-	-
2023	Don Omar	"Cuestion de Tiempo"	Forever King	check	-	-	-
2023	Boza & Kenia Os	"Ocean"	Sin Sol	check	check	-	-
2023	Peso Pluma & Grupo Frontera	"Tulum"	Génesis	check	check	check	check
2023	Karol G	"Mi Ex Tenía Razón"	Mañana Será Bonito (Bichota Season)	check	check	check	-
2023	Maluma	"Don Juan"	Don Juan	check	-	-	-
2023	Maluma	"Coco loco"	Don Juan	check	-	-	-
2023	Maluma	"Procura"	Don Juan	check	-	-	-
2023	Maluma	"Hace Un Mes"	Don Juan	check	check	check	check
2023	Maluma	"Bikini"	Don Juan	check	-	check	check
2023	Maluma	"La Reina"	Don Juan	check	check	check	-
2023	Maluma & Carín León	"Según Quién"	Don Juan	check	check	check	-
2023	Maluma & Yandel	"Trofeo"	Don Juan	check	-	-	-
2023	Maluma & Marc Anthony	"La Fórmula"	Don Juan	check	check	check	-
2023	Cuco & Alemán	"Coastin'"	Non-album single	-	check	check	-
2023	Alejandro Fernández	"Difícil Tu Caso"	Non-album single	check	check	-	-
2023	Yahritza y su Esencia	"Dos Extraños"	Obsessed Pt. 2	check	check	check	-
2023	Yahritza y su Esencia	"Dubai"	Obsessed Pt. 2	check	check	check	-
2023	Yahritza y su Esencia	"Rositas"	Obsessed Pt. 2	check	check	check	-
2023	Yahritza y su Esencia	"No Se Puede Decir Adiós"	Obsessed Pt. 2	check	check	check	-
2023	Yahritza y su Esencia & Grupo Frontera	"Frágil"	Obsessed Pt. 2	check	check	check	check
2023	Shakira & Fuerza Regida	"El Jefe"	Las Mujeres Ya No Lloran	check	check	check	-
2023	Becky G	"Bien Canijo"	Esquinas	check	check	check	-
2023	Becky G	"Un Puño de Tierra"	Esquinas	-	check	check	-
2023	Becky G	"Los Astros"	Esquinas	check	check	check	-
2023	Becky G	"Por Un Amor"	Esquinas	-	check	check	-
2023	Becky G	"Cruz de Olvido"	Esquinas	-	check	check	-
2023	Becky G	"Querido Abuelo"	Esquinas	check	check	check	-
2023	Becky G & Iván Cornejo	"2ndo Chance"	Esquinas	check	check	check	-
2023	Becky G & Danny Lux	"Cries In Spanish"	Esquinas	check	check	check	-
2023	Becky G & Gabito Ballesteros	"La Nena"	Esquinas	check	check	check	-
2023	Becky G & Peso Pluma	"Chanel"	Esquinas	check	check	check	-
2023	Becky G & Yahritza y su Esencia	"Patras"	Esquinas	check	check	check	-
2023	Becky G & Chiquis Rivera	"Cuidadito"	Esquinas	check	check	check	-
2023	Becky G, Leonardo Aguilar & Ángela Aguilar	"Por el Contrario"	Esquinas	check	check	check	-
2023	Grupo Frontera	"Cansado de Sufrir"	El Comienzo	check	check	check	check
2023	Grupo Frontera	"Me Gustas"	El Comienzo	-	check	check	check
2023	Grupo Frontera	"Cuídala"	El Comienzo	check	check	check	check
2023	Grupo Frontera	"Le Va Doler"	El Comienzo	check	check	check	check
2023	Grupo Frontera	"Amor Propio"	El Comienzo	check	check	check	check
2023	Grupo Frontera & Bad Bunny	"un x100to"	El Comienzo	check	check	check	check
2023	Grupo Frontera & Junior H	"En Altavoz"	El Comienzo	check	check	check	check
2023	Grupo Frontera & Yahritza y su Esencia	"Las Flores"	El Comienzo	check	check	check	check
2023	Grupo Frontera & Manuel Turizo	"De Lunes a Lunes"	El Comienzo	check	check	check	check
2023	Grupo Frontera & Grupo Firme	"El Amor de Su Vida"	El Comienzo	check	check	check	check
2023	Grupo Frontera & Ke personajes	"Ojitos Rojos"	El Comienzo	check	check	check	check
2023	Chayanne	"Necesito Un Segundo"	Bailemos Otra Vez	check	-	-	-
2023	Arcángel	"Me Gusta Tu Flow"	Sentimiento, Elegancia y Más Maldad	check	check	check	-
2023	Arcángel & Grupo Frontera	"ALV"	Sentimiento, Elegancia y Más Maldad	check	check	check	-
2023	Rels B & Kenia Os	"Por Dentro"	Non-album singles	check	check	-	-
2023	Carin Leon & Grupo Frontera	"Alch Si"	Non-album singles	check	check	check	-
2023	Grupo Firme & Luis Mexia	"XL"	Non-album singles	check	-	-	-
2023	La Arrolladora Banda El Limon	"Manos De Tijera"	Non-album singles	check	-	-	-
2023	Aitana	"A La Calle"	Non-album singles	check	-	-	-
2023	Karol G	"Que Chimba De Vida"	Non-album singles	check	check	check	-
2024	Prince Royce & Gabito Ballesteros	"Cosas de la Peda"	Llamada Perdida	check	check	check	-
2024	Maluma & J Blavin	"Gafas Negras"	Don Juan	check	-	-	-
2024	Maluma & Octavio Cuadras & Marca Registrada	"Bling Bling"	Non-album single	-	check	check	-
2024	Jay Wheeler & Elio Leiros	"Mi Otra Mitad (remix)"	Non-album single	check	-	-	-
2024	Shakira & Grupo Frontera	"(Entre Paréntesis)"	Las Mujeres Ya No Lloran	check	check	check	-
2024	Ryan Castro & Ludmilla	"Piña Colada"	Non-album single	check	-	-	-
2024	Jerry Rivera	"No Le Cuentes"	Non-album single	check	-	-	-
2024	La Arrolladora Banda El Limon	"Aqui Hay Para Llevar"	Non-album single	check	-	-	-
2024	Banda Los Recoditos	"Olvidalo Conmigo"	Non-album single	check	-	-	-
2024	Nicki Nicole	"Ojos Verdes"	Non-album single	check	-	-	-
2024	Camilo	"No Se Vale"	Un	check	-	-	-
2024	Camilo	"En Tus Sueños O En Los Mios"	Dos	check	-	-	-
2024	Camilo	"Misión Imposible"	Tres	check	-	-	-
2024	Grupo Frontera & Christian Nodal	"Ya Pedo Quién Sabe"	Jugando A Que No Pasa Nada	check	check	check	check
2024	Grupo Frontera & Maluma	"Por Que Sera"	Jugando A Que No Pasa Nada	check	check	check	check
2024	Grupo Frontera & Morat	"Los Dos"	Jugando A Que No Pasa Nada	check	check	check	check
2024	Grupo Frontera & Nicki Nicole	"Desquite"	Jugando A Que No Pasa Nada	check	check	check	check
2024	Grupo Frontera	"F*cking Amor"	Jugando A Que No Pasa Nada	check	check	check	check
2024	Grupo Frontera	"Me Hizo Un Favor"	Jugando A Que No Pasa Nada	check	check	check	check
2024	Grupo Frontera	"No Hay Vato Perfecto"	Jugando A Que No Pasa Nada	check	check	check	check
2024	Grupo Frontera	"Echandote De Menos"	Jugando A Que No Pasa Nada	check	check	check	check
2024	Grupo Frontera	"Nunca La Olvide"	Jugando A Que No Pasa Nada	check	check	check	check
2024	Grupo Frontera	"No Se Que Paso"	Jugando A Que No Pasa Nada	check	check	check	check
2024	Grupo Frontera	"Ibiza"	Jugando A Que No Pasa Nada	check	check	check	check
2024	Grupo Frontera	"Quedate Bebe"	Jugando A Que No Pasa Nada	check	check	check	check
2024	Ryan Castro	"Gata G"	El Cantante Del Ghetto	check	-	-	-
2024	Ryan Castro & Yandel	"Maleante"	El Cantante Del Ghetto	check	-	-	-
2024	Pepe Aguilar	"Mira Quien Lo Dice"	Non-album single	check	-	-	-
2024	Anitta	"um por cento (un x100to)"	Non-album single	check	-	-	-
2024	Kinky	"un x100to"	5 disparos	check	-	-	-
2024	Carin Leon & Leon Bridges	"It Was Always You"	Boca Chueca	check	check	-	-
2024	Carin Leon & Kane Brown	"The One (Pero No Como Yo)"	Boca Chueca	check	-	-	-
2024	Carin Leon	"Cuando La Vida Sea Trago"	Boca Chueca	check	check	check	-
2024	Carin Leon	"Casi Oficial"	Boca Chueca	check	-	-	-
2024	Carin Leon	"Bebe No Cambies Tu"	Boca Chueca	check	-	-	-
2024	Carin Leon	"Que Feo Se Siente El Amor"	Boca Chueca	check	-	-	-
2024	Carin Leon	"Despidase Bien"	Boca Chueca	check	check	-	-
2024	Maluma	"Contrato"	Non-album single	check	check	check	-
2024	Peso Pluma, Natanael Cano & Gabito Ballesteros	"Vino Tinto"	Exodo	check	check	-	-
2024	Peso Pluma & Oscar Maydon	"Santal 33"	Exodo	check	check	-	-
2024	Peso Pluma	"14-14"	Exodo	check	check	-	-
2024	Peso Pluma & Kenia Os	"Tommy & Pamela"	Exodo	check	-	-	-
2024	Karol G	"Si Antes Te Hubiera Conocido"	Non-album single	check	check	-	-
2024	Ivan Cornejo	"Herida Abierta"	Mirada	check	-	-	-
2024	Ivan Cornejo	"Vuelve"	Mirada	check	-	-	-
2024	Ivan Cornejo	"Atencion"	Mirada	check	-	-	-
2024	Romeo Santos & Grupo Frontera	"Angel"	Non-album single	check	check	check	check
2024	Jasiel Nuñez	"Bien High"	Non-album single	check	-	-	-
2024	Khalid	"Sincere"	Sincere	check	check	-	-
2024	Banda MS	"Pasa Tips"	Non-album single	check	-	-	-
2024	Eden Muñoz	"Me Rento"	Non-album single	check	-	-	-
2024	Tito Double P & Grupo Frontera	"Ay Mama"	Incomodo	check	-	-	-
2024	Christian Nodal	"La Corazonada"	Pal Cora	check	-	-	-
2024	Wisin & Manuel Turizo	"Indirectas"	Mr. W	check	-	-	-
2024	Shakira	"Soltera"	Non-album single	check	-	-	-
2024	Grupo Frontera	"Hecha Pa Mi"	Non-album single	check	check	check	check
2024	Becky G	"Otro Capítulo"	Encuentros	check	check	check	-
2024	Carin Leon & Gabito Ballesteros	"Ese Vato No Te Queda"	Non-album single	check	-	-	-
2024	Jasiel Nuñez	"Codigo Postal"	La Odisea	check	check	-	-
2024	Jasiel Nuñez	"Balenciaga Adidas"	La Odisea	check	check	-	-
2024	Mike Bahia	"La Indocumentada"	Calidosa	check	-	-	-
2024	Maluma	"Cosas Pendientes"	Non-album single	check	check	check	-
2024	Manuel Turizo	"Sigueme Besando Asi"	201	check	check	-	-
2024	Manuel Turizo	"A Nombre Tuyo"	201	check	check	-	-
2024	Manuel Turizo	"Plata Pa Gastar"	201	check	check	-	-
2024	Manuel Turizo	"La Ex De Mi Amigo"	201	check	check	-	-
2024	Grupo Frontera & Oscar Maydon	"Que Te Parece"	Non-album single	check	check	check	check
2024	Grupo Frontera & Gabito Ballesteros	"Pienso En Ella"	Non-album single	check	check	check	check
2024	Sech & Elena Rose	"1-0"	Tranki, Todo Pasa	check	check	-	-
2024	Carin Leon	"El Curioso"	Palabra de To's	check	-	-	check
2024	Tiago PZK & Grupo Frontera	"Mi Corazon"	Non-album single	check	check	-	-
2024	Fuerza Regida & Grupo Frontera	"Me Jalo"	Mala Mia	check	check	check	check
2024	Fuerza Regida & Grupo Frontera	"0 Sentimientos"	Mala Mia	check	check	check	check
2024	Fuerza Regida & Grupo Frontera	"S.O.S."	Mala Mia	check	check	check	check
2024	Fuerza Regida & Grupo Frontera	"Coqueta"	Mala Mia	check	check	check	check
2024	Fuerza Regida & Grupo Frontera	"Aurora"	Mala Mia	-	check	check	check
2025	Alejandro Sanz & Grupo Frontera	"Hoy No Me Siento Bien"	Non-album single	check	check	check	-
2025	Christian Nodal	"Contigo Al Cielo"	Pal Cora EP 2	check	-	-	-
2025	Yuridia	"Pena Ajena"	Sin Llorar	check	-	-	-
2025	Los Plebes Del Rancho De Ariel Camacho	"Ya Soltaron Al Diablo"	Non-album single	check	-	-	-
2025	Grupo Frontera	"Ya No"	Non-album single	check	check	check	check
2025	Bomba Estereo & Rawayana	"Siento (Virgo)"	Astropical	check	check	check	-
2025	Christian Nodal	"El Amigo"	Non-album single	check	check	check	check
2025	Juanes	"Una Noche Contigo"	Non-album single	check	-	-	-
2025	Neton Vega & Grupo Frontera	"La Buena Eras Tu"	Non-album single	check	check	check	check
2025	Grupo Firme	"Segun Mi Reloj"	Evolucion	check	-	-	-
2025	Grupo Firme	"Quien La Viera"	Evolucion	check	-	-	-
2025	Jessie Reyez	"**NIGHTS WE'LL NEVER HAVE**"	Paid In Memories	check	check	-	-
2025	Karol G	"Milagros"	Non-album single	check	check	check	-
2025	Yahritza Y Su Esencia	"Que Puedo Perder"	Non-album single	check	check	-	-
2025	Carin Leon & Maluma	"Si Tu Me Vieras"	Non-album single	check	check	check	-
2025	Christian Nodal	"No Me Importa"	Quien + Como Yo?	check	-	-	-
2025	Christian Nodal & Neton Vega	"EBVSY"	Quien + Como Yo?	check	-	-	-
2025	Gabito Ballesteros & J.Balvin	"La Troca"	Non-album single	check	check	check	-
2025	Angela Aguilar	"Libre Corazon"	Nadie Se Va Como Llego	check	-	-	-
2025	Santana & Grupo Frontera	"Me Retiro"	Non-album single	check	check	check	-
2025	Grupo Frontera & Carin Leon	"Mutuo"	YLQV	check	check	check	check
2025	Grupo Frontera & Mister Chivo	"Que Haces Por Aca?"	YLQV	check	check	check	check
2025	Grupo Frontera & Manuel Turizo	"La Del Proceso"	YLQV	check	check	check	check
2025	Grupo Frontera & Neton Vega	"La Buena Eras Tu"	YLQV	check	check	check	check
2025	Grupo Frontera	"No Se Parece A Ti"	YLQV	check	check	check	check
2025	Wisin	"Bloqueau"	WWW	check	-	-	-
2025	Karol G	"Ivonny Bonita"	Tropicoqueta	check	check	check	-
2025	Karol G & Eddy Lover	"Dile Luna"	Tropicoqueta	check	check	check	-
2025	Karol G	"Cuando Me Muera Te Olvido"	Tropicoqueta	check	-	check	-
2025	Karol G & Marco Antonio Solis	"Coleccionando Heridas"	Tropicoqueta	check	check	check	-
2025	Karol G & Grecy	"Amiga Mia"	Tropicoqueta	check	check	check	-
2025	Karol G	"Ese Hombre Es Malo"	Tropicoqueta	check	check	check	-
2025	Karol G	"No Puedo Vivir Sin El"	Tropicoqueta	check	check	check	-
2025	Karol G & Mariah	"FKN Movie"	Tropicoqueta	check	-	check	-
2025	Karol G & Manu Chao	"Viajando Por El Mundo"	Tropicoqueta	check	check	check	-
2025	Karol G	"Si Antes Te Hubiera Conocido"	Tropicoqueta	check	check	check	-
2025	Karol G	"Tropicoqueta"	Tropicoqueta	check	check	check	-
2025	Natanael Cano	"Porque La Demora"	Porque La Demora	-	check	-	-
2025	Natanael Cano	"Como Es"	Porque La Demora	-	check	-	-
2025	Natanael Cano	"Polos Opuestos"	Porque La Demora	-	check	-	-
2025	Natanael Cano & Gabito Ballesteros	"Perlas Negras"	Porque La Demora	-	check	-	-
2025	Natanael Cano & Badguy Chapo & Capo	"Hoy Nos Amanecio"	Porque La Demora	-	check	-	-
2025	Natanael Cano	"Blancanieves"	Porque La Demora	-	check	-	-
2025	Natanael Cano	"Dejala Brillar"	Porque La Demora	-	check	-	-
2025	Natanael Cano & Victor Mendivil	"Bellakita"	Porque La Demora	-	check	-	-
2025	Natanael Cano & Badguy Chapo	"Cholo"	Porque La Demora	-	check	-	-
2025	Natanael Cano & Make Towers & Ganggy	"El Juez"	Porque La Demora	-	check	-	-
2025	Natanael Cano & Eladio Carrion	"Como Tony"	Porque La Demora	-	check	-	-
2025	Natanael Cano & Floyymenor"	"Mary Poppins"	Porque La Demora	check	check	-	-
2025	Natanael Cano	"No Vuelve"	Porque La Demora	-	check	-	-
2025	Natanael Cano	"Primero Muerto"	Porque La Demora	check	check	-	-
2025	Natanael Cano & Victor	"Comida Del Espacio"	Porque La Demora	-	check	-	-
2025	Natanael Cano	"VLV"	Porque La Demora	-	check	-	-
2025	Kapo & Yandel	"Baul De Los Recuerdos pt. 1"	Por Si Alguien Nos Escucha	check	-	-	-
2025	Mana & Carin Leon	"Vivir Sin Aire" (version Regional Mexicana)	Non-album single	-	check	check	-
2025	Natanael Cano & Anuel AA	"Como Es (Remix)"	Non-album single	-	check	-	-
2025	Ryan Castro & Grupo Frontera	"Apodo"	Non-album single	check	check	check	check
2025	Bia & Young Miko	"Birthday Behavior"	Non-album single	check	check	-	-
2025	Xavi & Grupo Frontera	"No Capea"	Non-album single	check	check	check	check
2025	Alan Arrieta	"Lokota"	Non-album single	-	check	-	check
2025	Grupo Firme & Grupo Frontera	"Modo Dificil"	Non-album single	check	check	check	check
2025	Sech & Boza	"Paris"	Non-album single	check	-	-	-
2025	Grupo Frontera	"se me sale"	Lo Que Me Falto Por Llorar	check	check	check	check
2025	Grupo Frontera	"si me quieres"	Lo Que Me Falto Por Llorar	check	check	check	check
2025	Grupo Frontera & Ozuna	"no lo ves"	Lo Que Me Falto Por Llorar	check	check	check	check
2025	Grupo Frontera	"quien la manda"	Lo Que Me Falto Por Llorar	check	check	check	check
2025	Grupo Frontera	"monterrey"	Lo Que Me Falto Por Llorar	check	check	check	check
2025	Grupo Frontera	"que bueno que te fuiste"	Lo Que Me Falto Por Llorar	check	check	check	check
2025	Grupo Frontera & Myke Towers	"triste pero bien c*bron"	Lo Que Me Falto Por Llorar	check	check	check	check
2025	Grupo Frontera	"ay bebe"	Lo Que Me Falto Por Llorar	check	check	check	check
2025	Grupo Frontera & Tito Doble P	"echame la mano"	Lo Que Me Falto Por Llorar	check	check	check	check
2025	Grupo Frontera	"tranqui"	Lo Que Me Falto Por Llorar	check	check	check	check
2025	Grupo Frontera & Los Dareyes de la Sierra	"mi droga"	Lo Que Me Falto Por Llorar	check	check	check	check
2025	Grupo Frontera, Fuerza Regida & Cris MJ	"tu favorito"	Lo Que Me Falto Por Llorar	check	check	check	check
2025	Grupo Frontera	"lalala"	Lo Que Me Falto Por Llorar	check	check	check	check
2025	Ryan Castro	"Si Me Preguntaran"	HOPI SENDE	check	-	-	-
2025	Carlos Santana & Carin Leon	"Velas"	Non-album single	check	check	check	check
2025	Neton Vega	"Pvta Luna"	Non-album single	check	check	-	-
2025	Neton Vega	/Weekenes	DELIRIUM	check	check	check	check
2025	Neton Vega & Ryan Castro	/AQNLGP	DELIRIUM	check	check	check	check
2025	Neton Vega & Myke Towers	/90 60 90	DELIRIUM	check	check	check	check
2025	Neton Vega	/Turistico	DELIRIUM	check	check	check	check
2025	Neton Vega	/Melday	DELIRIUM		check	check	check
2025	Neton Vega	/Tramadol	DELIRIUM	check	check	check	check
2025	Neton Vega	/3 Dias +	DELIRIUM	check	check	check	check
2025	Neton Vega, Jowell & Randy	/Baby De Los 2 Miles	DELIRIUM	check	check	check	check
2025	Neton Vega	/Lentes	DELIRIUM	check	check	check	check
2025	Neton Vega	/Desvelaos	DELIRIUM	check	check	check	check
2025	Arcangel & Grupo Firme	"Cuanto Cuesta"	Non-album single	check	check	check	check
2025	La Arrolladora Banda El Limon & Juanes	"Una Noche Contigo"	Non-album single	check	-	-	-
2025	Armenta & Jorsshh	"De Nuevo"	Non-album single	check	-	-	-
2025	Beele & Ozuna	"Se Ve"	STENDHAL	check	check	-	-
2025	Grupo Frontera & Calle 24	"Beses Asi"	Non-album single	check	check	check	check
2025	Peso Pluma & Tito Double P	"ni pedo"	DINASTIA	check	-	-	-
2025	Peso Pluma & Tito Double P	"7-3"	DINASTIA	check	-	-	-
2025	Peso Pluma & Tito Double P	"malibu"	DINASTIA	check	-	-	-
2025	Peso Pluma & Tito Double P	"tu con el"	DINASTIA	check	-	-	-
2025	Bizarrap & JBalvin	"BZRP Music Session #62"	Non-album single	check	-	-	-
2026	Rawayana, Carin Leon & Grupo Frontera	"Como De Sol A Sol"	Donde Es El After?	check	-	-	-
2026	Carin Leon & Xavi	"La Morrita"	Non-album single	check	check	check	-
2026	Arcangel	"La 8va Maravilla"	La 8va Maravilla	check	check	check	-
2026	Fuerza Regida	"Triston"	Non-album single	check	-	-	-
2026	Jorsshh	"Sad Valentine"	Non-album single	check	-	-	-
2026	Xavi, Esau Ortiz, Alan Arrieta	"San Charly"	Non-album single	check	-	-	-
2026	Grupo Frontera & Silvestre Dangond	"Imposible"	Non-album single	check	check	check	check
2026	Grupo Frontera	"Un Solo Corazon"	Cancion Oficial de la Seleccion Mexicana	check	check	check	check
2026	Jelly Roll & Carin Leon	"Lighter"	FIFA SOUNDTRACK	check	-	-	-
2026	Ricardo Montaner	"Para Que Seas Feliz"	Non-album single	check	-	-	-
2026	Ricardo Montaner & Eden Muñoz	"Para Que Seas Feliz" (version Regional Mexicana)	Non-album single	check	-	-	-
2026	Rauw Alejandro	"Dando Vueltas"	Non-album single	check	-	-	-
2026	Luis R Conriquez & Grupo Frontera	"Salma Hayek"	Non-album single	check	-	-	-
2026	Carin Leon	"En La Misma Cama"	MUDA	check	check	check	-
2026	Carin Leon	"Ruca"	MUDA	check	check	check	-
2026	Carin Leon & Juanes	"Carranga"	MUDA	check	check	check	-
2026	Carin Leon	"Huyo"	MUDA	check	check	check	-
2026	Carin Leon	"Doliendo Bastante"	MUDA	check	check	check	-
2026	Carin Leon & Rawayanna	"Bingo"	MUDA	check	check	check	-
2026	Carin Leon	"Tokio"	MUDA	check	check	check	-
2026	Carin Leon	"Vuelve o Vete"	MUDA	check	check	check	-
2026	Carin Leon	"Sustancias y Bebidas"	MUDA	check	check	check	-
2026	Carin Leon	"Olvidate"	MUDA	-	check	check	-
2026	Carin Leon	"Ay Lupita"	MUDA	check	check	check	-
2026	Elena Rose & Manuel Turizo	"La Semana"	Non-album single	check	-	-	check
2026	Grupo Frontera	"Ojitos Bellos"	Con Dolor	check	check	check	check
2026	Grupo Frontera	"Bye"	Con Dolor	check	check	check	check
2026	Grupo Frontera	"Cuentame"	Con Dolor	check	check	check	check
2026	Grupo Frontera	"Te Voy A Conquistar"	Con Dolor	check	check	check	check
2026	Grupo Frontera	"Pary"	Con Dolor	check	check	check	check
2026	Grupo Frontera & Alejandro Fernandez	"Cada Vez Me Gusta Mas"	Con Dolor	check	check	check	check
2026	Tito Double P	"COCO"	ACOMODO	check	-	-	-
2026	Tito Double P	"LA FAMA"	ACOMODO	check	-	-	-
2026	Tito Double P	"SOL MENOR"	ACOMODO	check	-	-	-
2026	Tito Double P	"YAMAME"	ACOMODO	check	-	-	-
2026	Santana & Becky G	"Mi Gran Amor"	Non-album single	check	check	check	check
2026	Maluma, Grupo Frontera, El Bogueto	"Una Vida Juntos"	LOCO X VOLVER	check	check	check	check
2026	La Joaquin & Angela Torres	"Fingia"	Non-album single	check	-	-	-
2026	Ricardo Murillo	"Enamorate De Alguien"	Non-album single	check	-	-	-
2026	Alejandro Fernandez	"Mi Mexico Lindo"	FIFA OFFICIAL SOUNDTRACK	check	check	check	-
2026	RØZ & Rauw Alejandro	"dando vueltas remix"	Non-album single	check	-	-	-
2026	Jasiel Nuñez	"Japon"	NOMADA	check	-	-	-
2026	La Arrolladora Banda El Limon	"Mira Bebe"	Non-album single	check	-	-	-
2026	Luis R Conriquez	"Al Chile Pega"	Muchacho Alegre	check	-	-	-
2026	Jorsshh & Calle 24	"Antes"	Ay Weyy	check	-	-	-
2026	Gracie Abrams	"Broke My Heart"	Daughter from Hell	check	-	-	-
2026	Karol G	"Alguien Que Te Amaba"	No Me Arrepiento de Sentir Tanto	check	check	check	-
2026	Karol G	"For u My Lova"	No Me Arrepiento de Sentir Tanto	check	check	check	-
2026	Karol G	"Despues De Ti"	No Me Arrepiento de Sentir Tanto	check	-	-	-
2026	Beyonce & Maluma	"Cuerpo (Tumbao)"	B'Day	check	check	check	-
2026	Camilo	"El Traje"	Para Cuando Sean Mayores	check	-	-	-
2026	Ricky Martin & Grupo Frontera	"Tu Recuerdo"	ReVivo	-	check	check	-
2026	Teddy Swims	"Perfect Man"	Non-album single	check	-	-	-
2026	Kapo	"Playa Fria"	Non-album single	check	-	-	-
2026	Carin Leon & Ryan Castro	"Atte El Insuperable"	MudaH	check	check	check	-
2026	Carin Leon	"Ya No Llora"	MudaH	check	check	check	-
2026	Carin Leon	"El Bolero"	MudaH	check	check	check	-
2026	Farruko	"Que Talento"	Non-album single	check	-	-	-
2026	Rawayana	"Despues de un KO"	Campeon Gabacho Soundtrack	check	check	check	check
2026	Xavi	"Nadie Te Extraña"	Non-album single	check	check	check	-
2026	Los 2 De Tamaulipas & Grupo Frontera	"Piquito"	Non-album single	check	check	check	check
2026	Santana & Natalia Lafourcade	"Hermano"	Non-album single	check	check	check	-
