= List of awards and nominations received by Christian Nodal =

Christian Nodal awards and nominations
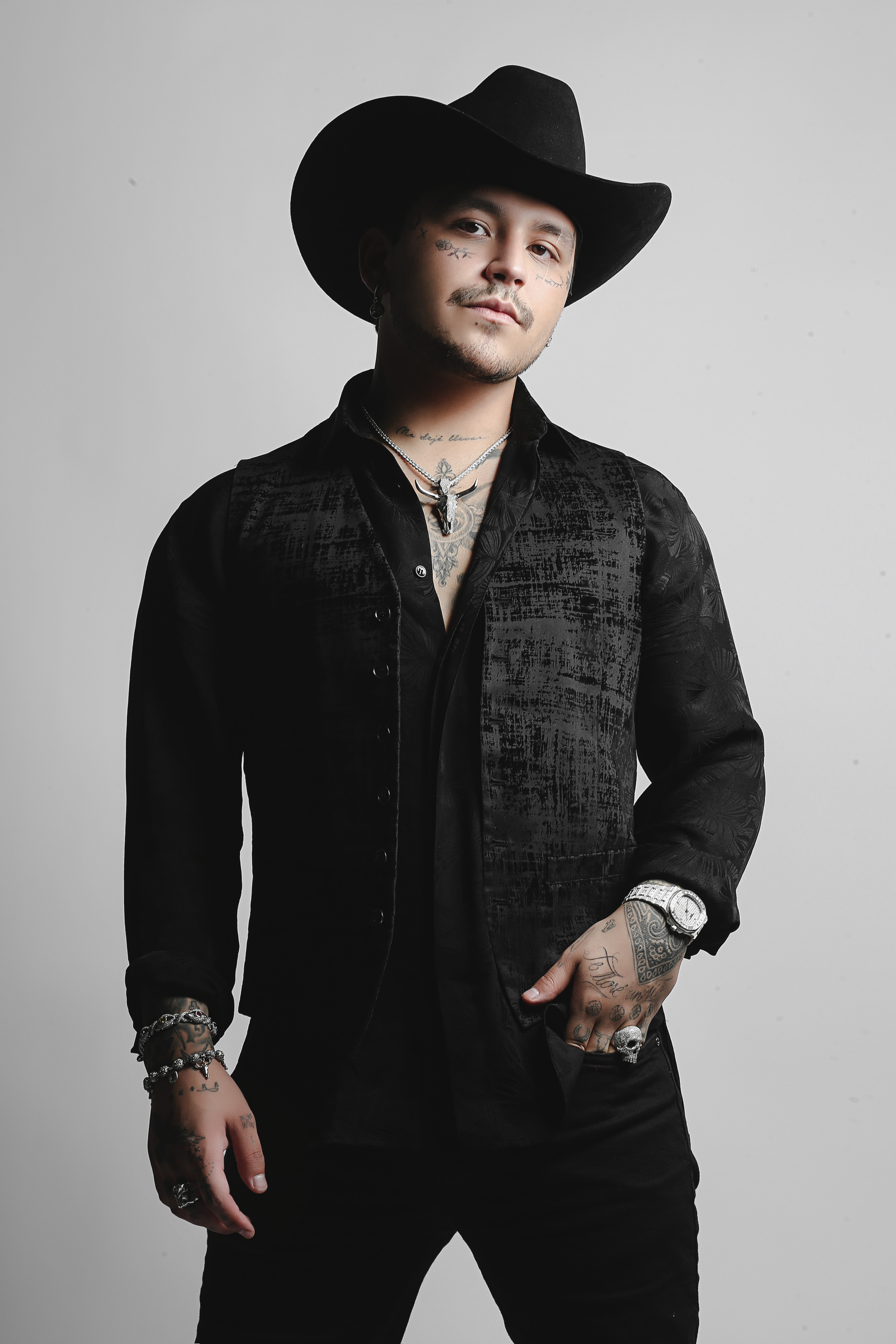
- Nodal in 2022
Awards and nominations
Award	Wins	Nominations
Billboard Latin Music Awards	7	12
Billboard Music Awards	0	1
Grammy Awards	0	3
Heat Latin Music Awards	1	7
iHeartRadio Music Awards	5	12
Latin American Music Awards	10	20
Latin Grammy Awards	7	13
MTV Millennial Awards	0	2
Premios Juventud	3	18
Premios Lo Nuestro	10	30
Premios Tu Música Urbano	2	2

Totals (Note: Certain award groups do not simply award one winner. They acknowledge several different recipients, have runners-up, and have third place. Since this is a specific recognition and is different from losing an award, runner-up mentions are considered wins in this award tally. For simplification and to avoid errors, each award in this list has been presumed to have had a prior nomination.)
- Wins: 44
- Nominations: 108

Christian Nodal is a Mexican musician, singer and songwriter. He has received various awards and nominations including seven Billboard Latin Music Awards, seven Latin Grammy Awards, ten Premios Lo Nuestro and three Grammy Awards nominations.

Nodal rose to prominence in 2017 after releasing his debut single "Adiós Amor", a Mariachi version of a 2008 song by Los Dareyes de la Sierra. The single was commercially successful in both Mexico and the United States. The same year, he released Me Dejé Llevar, his debut studio album. The success of the album and single led Nodal to win both Artist of the Year – New and Regional Mexican Artist of the Year – Solo at the 2018 Billboard Latin Music Awards. At the 19th Annual Latin Grammy Awards, he was nominated for Best New Artist and Best Ranchero/Mariachi Album, and won Best Regional Mexican Song for "Probablemente", being his first Latin Grammy win.

In 2019, he released his second studio album Ahora. At the 2019 Billboard Latin Music Awards he won Regional Mexican Artist of the Year again, the second of five consecutive wins in the category. The album won the Latin Grammy Award for Best Ranchero/Mariachi Album while "No Te Contaron Mal" won Best Regional Mexican Song, Nodal's second win in the category. In 2020, he received his first of three consecutive wins for Regional Mexican Artist of the Year at the Premios Lo Nuestro.

His third album Ayayay! was released in 2020, with a deluxe versions being released later in the year. The album was nominated for the Grammy Award for Best Regional Mexican Music Album (including Tejano) in 2021, being his first Grammy Award nomination, the deluxe version was nominated for the same award the following year. In 2021, he released the single "Botella Tras Botella" alongside Mexican rapper Gera MX, the song was commercially successful, peaking at number 60 at the Billboard Hot 100, being Nodal's first and only appearance to date on the chart. The song won awards are the Latin American Music Awards of 2022, the Premios Lo Nuestro and the Premios Tu Música Urbano.

His EP Forajido, was released in 2022. It gave Nodal his third Grammy Award nomination for Best Regional Mexican Music Album (including Tejano) and won the Latin Grammy Award for Best Ranchero/Mariachi Album.

== Awards and nominations ==
Award	Year	Category	Nominated work	Result	Ref.
Billboard Music Awards	2018	Top Latin Album	Me Dejé Llevar	Nominated	
Billboard Latin Music Awards	2018	Artist of the Year – New	Himself	Won	
Billboard Latin Music Awards	2018	Regional Mexican Artist of the Year – Solo	Himself	Won	
Billboard Latin Music Awards	2018	Regional Mexican Song of the Year	"Adiós Amor"	Won	
Billboard Latin Music Awards	2018	Regional Mexican Song of the Year	"Probablemente" (featuring David Bisbal)	Nominated	
Billboard Latin Music Awards	2018	Regional Mexican Album of the Year	Me Dejé Llevar	Nominated	
Billboard Latin Music Awards	2019	Regional Mexican Artist of the Year	Himself	Won	
Billboard Latin Music Awards	2020	Regional Mexican Artist of the Year	Himself	Won	
Billboard Latin Music Awards	2020	Regional Mexican Song of the Year	"De Los Besos Que Te Di"	Nominated	
Billboard Latin Music Awards	2020	Regional Mexican Album of the Year	Ahora	Nominated	
Billboard Latin Music Awards	2021	Regional Mexican Album of the Year	Ayayay!	Nominated	
Billboard Latin Music Awards	2021	Regional Mexican Artist of the Year, Solo	Himself	Won	
Billboard Latin Music Awards	2022	Regional Mexican Artist of the Year, Solo	Himself	Won	
Grammy Awards	2021	Best Regional Mexican Music Album (including Tejano)	Ayayay!	Nominated	
Grammy Awards	2022	Best Regional Mexican Music Album (including Tejano)	Ayayay! (Súper Deluxe)	Nominated	
Grammy Awards	2023	Best Regional Mexican Music Album (including Tejano)	EP #1 Forajido	Nominated	
Heat Latin Music Awards	2021	Best Regional Popular Artist	Himself	Nominated	
Heat Latin Music Awards	2022	Best Male Artist	Himself	Nominated	
Heat Latin Music Awards	2022	Best Popular Regional Artist	Himself	Won	
Heat Latin Music Awards	2022	Best Collaboration	"Botella Tras Botella" (with Gera MX)	Nominated	
Heat Latin Music Awards	2023	Best Male Artist	Herself	Nominated	
Heat Latin Music Awards	2023	Best Popular Regional Artist	Herself	Won	
Heat Latin Music Awards	2023	Best Collaboration	"La Siguiente" (with Kany Garcia)	Nominated	
Heat Latin Music Awards	2024	Best Popular Regional Artist	Himself	Nominated	
iHeartRadio Music Awards	2018	Best New Artist	Himself	Nominated	
iHeartRadio Music Awards	2018	Best New Regional Mexican Artist	Himself	Won	
iHeartRadio Music Awards	2018	Regional Mexican Song of the Year	"Adiós Amor"	Won	
iHeartRadio Music Awards	2019	Regional Mexican Song of the Year	"Me Dejé Llevar"	Nominated	
iHeartRadio Music Awards	2019	Regional Mexican Artist of the Year	Himself	Nominated	
iHeartRadio Music Awards	2020	Regional Mexican Artist of the Year	Himself	Nominated	
iHeartRadio Music Awards	2020	Regional Mexican Song of the Year	"Nada Nuevo"	Nominated	
iHeartRadio Music Awards	2021	Regional Mexican Song of the Year	"Se Me Olvidó"	Won	
iHeartRadio Music Awards	2021	Regional Mexican Artist of the Year	Himself	Won	
iHeartRadio Music Awards	2021	Regional Music Album of the Year	Ayayay!	Won	
iHeartRadio Music Awards	2022	Regional Mexican Artist of the Year	Himself	Nominated	
iHeartRadio Music Awards	2022	Regional Mexican Song of the Year	"Dime Cómo Quieres" (with Angela Aguilar)	Nominated	
Latin American Music Awards	2018	Artist of the Year	Himself	Nominated	
Latin American Music Awards	2018	Favorite Regional Mexican Artist	Himself	Won	
Latin American Music Awards	2018	Album of the Year	Me Dejé Llevar	Nominated	
Latin American Music Awards	2018	Favorite Regional Mexican Album	Me Dejé Llevar	Won	
Latin American Music Awards	2018	Favorite Regional Mexican Song	"Me Dejé Llevar"	Nominated	
Latin American Music Awards	2019	Favorite Regional Mexican Song	"No Te Contaron Mal"	Won	
Latin American Music Awards	2019	Artist of the Year	Himself	Nominated	
Latin American Music Awards	2019	Favorite Regional Mexican Artist	Himself	Won	
Latin American Music Awards	2021	Artist of the Year	Himself	Nominated	
Latin American Music Awards	2021	Favorite Male Artist	Himself	Nominated	
Latin American Music Awards	2021	Favorite Regional Mexican Artist	Himself	Won	
Latin American Music Awards	2021	Favorite Regional Mexican Album	Ayayay!	Won	
Latin American Music Awards	2021	Favorite Video	"Dime Cómo Quieres" (with Angela Aguilar)	Nominated	
Latin American Music Awards	2022	Extraordinary Evolution Award	Himself	Won	
Latin American Music Awards	2022	Favorite Regional Mexican Artist	Himself	Won	
Latin American Music Awards	2022	Favorite Regional Mexican Song	"Botella Tras Botella" (with Gera MX)	Won	
Latin American Music Awards	2022	Collaboration of the Year	"Botella Tras Botella" (with Gera MX)	Nominated	
Latin American Music Awards	2022	Viral Song of the Year	"Botella Tras Botella" (with Gera MX)	Nominated	
Latin American Music Awards	2022	Favorite Regional Mexican Album	Ahora	Won	
Latin American Music Awards	2023	Favorite Regional Mexican Artist	Himself	Nominated	
Latin Grammy Awards (Note: Additionally, two other songs performed by Nodal but not written by him have been nominated for the Latin Grammy Award for Best Regional Mexican Song, the nomination went to the songwriters of each song, "De Los Besos Que Te Di" in 2019, written by José Esparza & Gussy Lau; and "Cuando Me Dé la Gana" in 2022, written by Christina Aguilera, Rafael Arcaute, Jorge Luis Chacín, Kat Dahlia, Yoel Henríquez, Yasmil Marrufo & Federico Vindver.)	2018	Best New Artist	Himself	Nominated	
Latin Grammy Awards	2018	Best Ranchero/Mariachi Album	Me Dejé Llevar	Nominated	
Latin Grammy Awards	2018	Best Regional Mexican Song	"Probablemente"	Won	
Latin Grammy Awards	2019	Best Regional Mexican Song	"No Te Contaron Mal"	Won	
Latin Grammy Awards	2019	Best Ranchero/Mariachi Album	Ahora	Won	
Latin Grammy Awards	2020	Best Ranchero/Mariachi Album	Ayayay!	Nominated	
Latin Grammy Awards	2020	Best Regional Mexican Song	"Ayayay!"	Nominated	
Latin Grammy Awards	2021	Best Regional Mexican Song	"Aquí Abajo"	Won	
Latin Grammy Awards	2021	Best Ranchero/Mariachi Album	Ayayay! (Súper Deluxe)	Nominated	
Latin Grammy Awards	2021	Best Norteño Album	Recordando a una Leyenda (with Los Plebes del Rancho de Ariel Camacho)	Nominated	
Latin Grammy Awards	2022	Best Ranchero/Mariachi Album	EP 1# Forajido	Won	
Latin Grammy Awards	2022	Best Regional Mexican Song	"Vivo en el 6"	Nominated	
Latin Grammy Awards	2023	Best Ranchero/Mariachi Album	Forajido EP2	Won	
Latin Grammy Awards	2025	Best Ranchero/Mariachi Album	¿Quién + Como Yo?	Won	
Latin Grammy Awards	2026	Best Ranchero/Mariachi Album	Bandera Blanca	Pending	
MTV Millennial Awards	2021	Mexican Artist	Himself	Nominated	
MTV Millennial Awards	2021	Hit of the Year	"Botella Tras Botella" (with Gera MX)	Nominated	
MTV Millennial Awards	2023	Mexican Artist	Himself	Nominated	
MTV Millennial Awards	2023	Couple Goals	Christian Nodal and Cazzu	Nominated	
Premios Juventud	2017	Breakthrough Artist	Himself	Nominated	
Premios Juventud	2017	Best Love Song	"Adiós Amor"	Nominated	
Premios Juventud	2017	Best Song for "La Troca"	"Adiós Amor"	Nominated	
Premios Juventud	2019	Best Scroll Stopper	Himself	Nominated	
Premios Juventud	2019	Regional Roots 2.0 (Best Regional Mexican Artist)	Himself	Won	
Premios Juventud	2019	Best Song: The Traffic Jam	"No Te Contaron Mal"	Nominated	
Premios Juventud	2020	Can't Get Enough Of This Song	"Se Me Olvidó"	Nominated	
Premios Juventud	2020	#Stay Home Concert	"Juntos por la Música"	Nominated	
Premios Juventud	2021	Male Youth Artist of the Year	Himself	Nominated	
Premios Juventud	2021	Best Mariachi Song - Ranchera	"Dime Cómo Quieres" (with Angela Aguilar)	Won	
Premios Juventud	2021	Viral Track of the Year (Song with the fastest rise in social media)	"Dime Cómo Quieres" (with Angela Aguilar)	Nominated	
Premios Juventud	2021	Best Regional Mexican Fusion	"Botella Tras Botella" (with Gera MX)	Nominated	
Premios Juventud	2022	Artist of the Youth – Male	Himself	Won	
Premios Juventud	2022	My Favorite Streaming Artist	Himself	Nominated	
Premios Juventud	2022	Best Regional Mexican Song	"Ya No Somos Ni Seremos"	Nominated	
Premios Juventud	2022	Best Regional Mexican Collaboration	"2 Veces" (with Los Plebes Del Rancho de Ariel Camacho)	Nominated	
Premios Juventud	2022	Best Regional Mexican Collaboration	"La Sinvergüenza" (with Banda MS de Sergio Lizárraga)	Nominated	
Premios Juventud	2022	Best Regional Mexican Fusion	"Te Lloré un Río" (with Maná)	Nominated	
Premios Juventud	2023	Best Regional Mexican Song	"Vivo en el 6"	Nominated	
Premios Juventud	2023	Best Regional Mexican Fusion	"La Siguiente" (with Kany García)	Nominated	
Premios Juventud	2023	Best Regional Mexican Fusion	"Por el Resto de Tu Vida" (with Tini)	Nominated	
Premios Juventud	2023	Best Regional Mexican Album	Forajido	Nominated	
Premios Juventud	2023	Couples That Blow Up My Social	Christian Nodal & Cazzu	Nominated	
Premios Juventud	2024	Best Regional Mexican Song	"Un Cumbión Dolido"	Nominated	
Premios Juventud	2024	Best Regional Mexican Album	Forajido EP2	Nominated	
Premio Lo Nuestro	2019	Artist of the Year	Himself	Nominated	
Premio Lo Nuestro	2019	Regional Mexican Male Artist of the Year	Himself	Won	
Premio Lo Nuestro	2020	Artist of the Year	Himself	Nominated	
Premio Lo Nuestro	2020	Regional Mexican Artist of the Year	Himself	Won	
Premio Lo Nuestro	2020	Regional Mexican Song of the Year	"Nada Nuevo"	Won	
Premio Lo Nuestro	2020	Regional Mexican Mariachi Song of the Year	"Nada Nuevo"	Won	
Premio Lo Nuestro	2020	Regional Mexican Mariachi Song of the Year	"Solos" (with Ana Bárbara)	Nominated	
Premio Lo Nuestro	2020	Album of the Year	Ahora	Nominated	
Premio Lo Nuestro	2021	Album of the Year	Ayayay!	Nominated	
Premio Lo Nuestro	2021	Artist of the Year	Himself	Nominated	
Premio Lo Nuestro	2021	Regional Mexican Artist of the Year	Himself	Won	
Premio Lo Nuestro	2021	Regional Mexican Song of the Year	"Se Me Olvidó"	Nominated	
Premio Lo Nuestro	2021	Regional Mexican "Mariachi/Ranchera" Song of the Year	"Se Me Olvidó"	Won	
Premio Lo Nuestro	2022	Artist of the Year	Herself	Nominated	
Premio Lo Nuestro	2022	Regional Mexican Artist of the Year	Herself	Won	
Premio Lo Nuestro	2022	Song of the Year	"Dime Cómo Quieres" (with Angela Aguilar)	Nominated	
Premio Lo Nuestro	2022	Regional Mexican Song of the Year	"Dime Cómo Quieres" (with Angela Aguilar)	Nominated	
Premio Lo Nuestro	2022	Regional Mexican Song of the Year	"Duele" (with Alejandro Fernández)	Nominated	
Premio Lo Nuestro	2022	Regional Mexican Collaboration of the Year	"Duele" (with Alejandro Fernández)	Nominated	
Premio Lo Nuestro	2022	Regional Mexican Collaboration of the Year	"Botella Tras Botella" (with Gera MX)	Won	
Premio Lo Nuestro	2022	Perfect Mix of the Year	"Botella Tras Botella" (with Gera MX)	Nominated	
Premio Lo Nuestro	2022	Regional Mexican "Mariachi/Ranchera" Song of the Year	"Duele" (with Alejandro Fernández)	Nominated	
Premio Lo Nuestro	2022	Regional Mexican "Mariachi/Ranchera" Song of the Year	"Aquí Abajo"	Nominated	
Premio Lo Nuestro	2023	Artist of the Year	Himself	Nominated	
Premio Lo Nuestro	2023	Male Regional Mexican Artist of the Year	Himself	Won	
Premio Lo Nuestro	2023	Album of the Year	EP 1# Forajido	Nominated	
Premio Lo Nuestro	2023	Regional Mexican Album of the Year	EP 1# Forajido	Nominated	
Premio Lo Nuestro	2023	Regional Mexican Song of the Year	"Ya No Somos Ni Seremos"	Nominated	
Premio Lo Nuestro	2023	Mariachi/Ranchera Song of the Year	"Ya No Somos Ni Seremos"	Won	
Premio Lo Nuestro	2023	Regional Mexican Collaboration of the Year	"La Sinvergüenza" (with Banda MS de Sergio Lizárraga)	Nominated	
Premio Lo Nuestro	2024	Male Regional Mexican Artist of the Year	Christian Nodal	Nominated	
Premio Lo Nuestro	2024	The Perfect Mix of the Year	"La Siguiente" (with Kany García)	Nominated	
Premio Lo Nuestro	2024	Regional Mexican Song of the Year	"Un Cumbión Dolido"	Nominated	
Premio Lo Nuestro	2024	Mariachi/Ranchera Song of the Year	"Un Cumbión Dolido"	Nominated	
Premio Lo Nuestro	2024	Regional Mexican Album of the Year	Foragido EP2	Nominated	
Premios Tu Música Urbano	2022	Top Artist — Regional Mexican Urban	Himself	Won	
Premios Tu Música Urbano	2022	Top Song — Regional Mexican	"Botella Tras Botella" (with Gera Mx)	Won	
Rolling Stone en Español Awards	2023	Artist of the Year	Himself	Nominated	
