= Ahora (Christian Nodal album) =

2019 studio album by Christian Nodal

Studio album by Christian Nodal
- Released: May 10, 2019
- Recorded: 2018–2019
- Studios: Estudio Alamos; Estudio Jordan de los Mochis
- Genre: Mariachi
- Length: 41:56
- Language: Spanish
- Labels: Fonovisa; Universal México
- Producer: Jaime González

Christian Nodal chronology
Me Dejé Llevar (2017)	Ahora (2019)	Ayayay! (2020)

Singles from Ahora
- 1. "No Te Contaron Mal" Released: September 7, 2018; 2. "Nada Nuevo" Released: February 15, 2019; 3. "De Los Besos Que Te Di" Released: April 15, 2019

Ahora (transl. Now) is the second studio album released by Mexican singer-songwriter Christian Nodal. It was released on May 10, 2019 via Fonovisa Records and Universal Music Latin. Produced by Jaime González, it follows Nodal's success with regional Mexican music in his debut studio album, Me Dejé Llevar (2017). Nodal served as the primary co-writer for the album, having co-written eight of the 14 songs. The album spawned three singles, "No Te Contaron Mal", "Nada Nuevo" and "De Los Besos Que Te Di", all of which charted in the top ten on Mexican charts.

The album received mainly positive reception from critics. Ahora peaked at number 19 on the Top 100 Mexico chart, and debuted at number seven on the Billboard Top Latin Albums chart in the United States. The album won Favorite Regional Mexican Album at the 2022 Latin American Music Awards and Best Ranchero/Mariachi Album at the 20th Annual Latin Grammy Awards. The album was certified platinum by the RIAA.

== Background ==
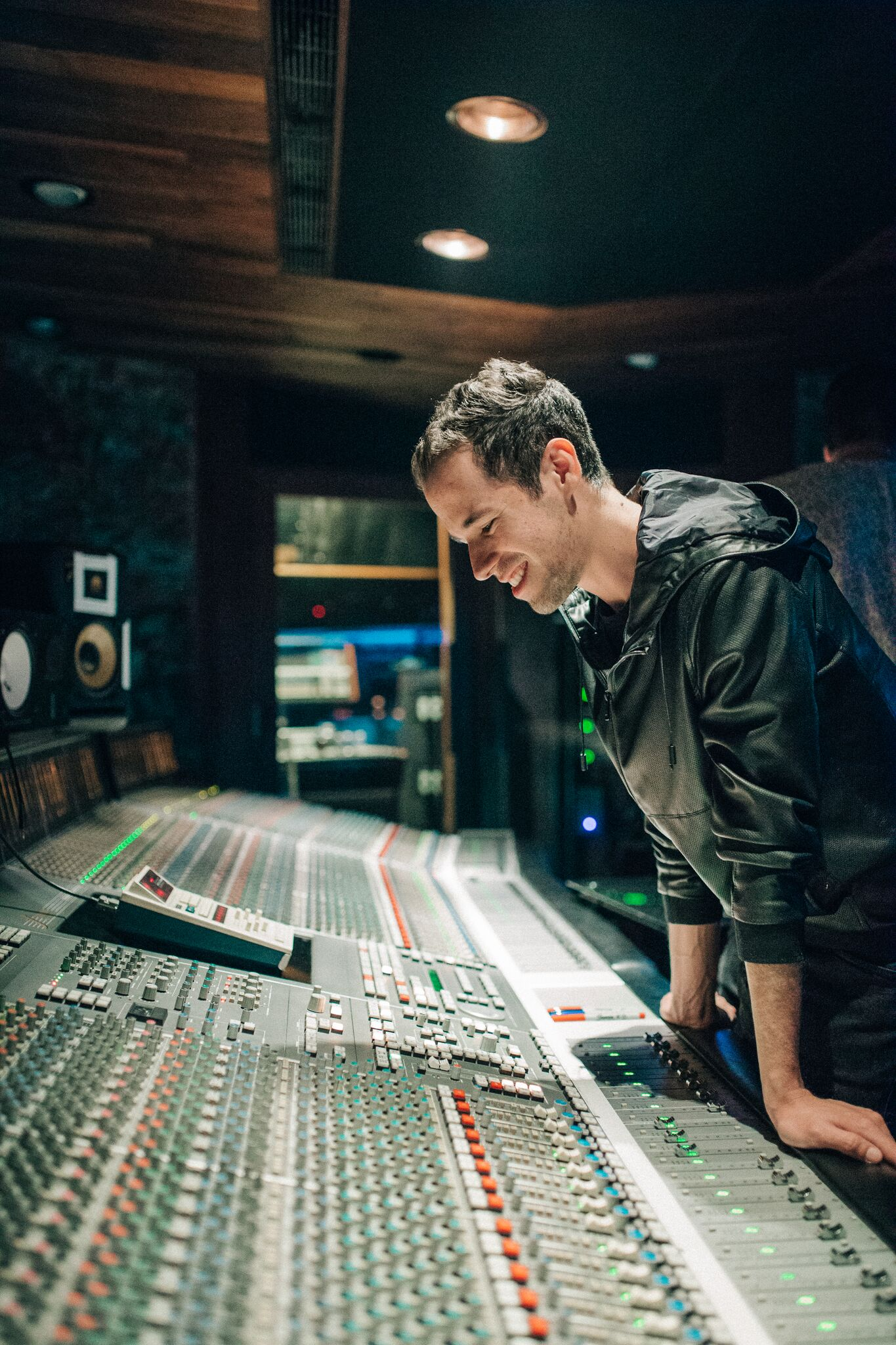
Mexican-American songwriter and record producer Edgar Barrera co-wrote seven songs on Ahora, being Nodal and Barrera's first collaboration.

Christian Nodal had signed with Universal Music Latin in 2016 in pursuit of a music career, and released his debut single "Adiós Amor" in April of that year. During this period of Nodal's career, songwriter and producer Edgar Barrera contacted Nodal on social media and, in the summer of 2018, the two met in person in Guadalajara, Jalisco; that same day, Barrera and Nodal wrote the song "No Te Contaron Mal" without any internet connection in thirty minutes. Nodal would co-write eight of the fourteen tracks on Ahora, seven of which being with Barrera. Recording for the album took place at the Estudio Alamos and the Estudio Jordan de los Mochis, with Jaime Gonzalez, who had previously worked with Ariel Camacho, producing the album.

== Promotion and singles ==
Three singles were released from Ahora. The first single, "No Te Contaron Mal", was released on September 7, 2018. It peaked at number two on the Monitor Latino Top 20 General Mexican Songs chart and at number 10 on the Hot Latin Songs in the United States. The song was certified eight times platinum by the Recording Industry Association of America (RIAA) in May 2019.

The second single, "Nada Nuevo", was released on February 14, 2019. Peaking at number eight in Mexico and at number 19 on the Hot Latin Songs, it was certified platinum by the RIAA. The third and final single, "De Los Besos Que Te Di", peaked at number three in Mexico and at number 12 on the Hot Latin Songs. The song was nominated for Best Regional Song at the 20th Annual Latin Grammy Awards and for Regional Song of the Year at the 27th Billboard Music Awards, and was certified gold by the RIAA. To promote the album, Nodal embarked on the Ahora Tour from 2019 to 2020.

== Reception ==
The album received mainly positive reviews from critics. Diario Occidente of El Mañana described the album as a "journey with stories of love and heartbreak, profound lyrics and lots of emotion". Sami Drasin of Billboard praised the album, stating "the Regional Mexican artist pours his heart out once again in 14 new tracks... despite having similar ranchera melodies and mariachi tunes throughout the production, each track tells its own heartfelt story and demonstrates Nodal’s mature sound".

The album was ranked number 25 by Remezcla staff on their Best Spanish-Language & Latin Music Albums of the Decade list, stating, "with the timeless timbre in his big voice, he’s able to connect with different generations of fans while conveying a wide range of emotions". Gisela Orozco of the Chicago Tribune gave positive thoughts on the album, stating, "composed of 14 songs, Ahora has a duet with the Colombian Sebastián Yatra in "Esta Noche", and has songs of love, heartbreak, [ones] with a mariachi rhythm, norteño and danceable".

Ahora was nominated for four total awards. It won the award for Favorite Regional Mexican Album at the 2022 Latin American Music Awards and Best Ranchero/Mariachi Album at the 2019 Latin Grammy Awards. It was also nominated the Regional Mexican Album of the Year award at the 2020 Billboard Latin Music Awards and for Album of the Year at the 2020 Lo Nuestro Awards.

== Commercial performance ==
The album peaked at number 19 on the AMPROFON Top 100 Mexico record chart, and was ranked at number 92 on the chart's year-end listing. It also debuted at number seven on the Billboard Top Latin Albums chart in the united states, becoming Nodal's second top-ten entry after Me Dejé Llevar (2017). On May 23, 2019, Ahora was certified platinum by the RIAA, with about 60,000 certified units.

== Accolades ==
Accolades for Ahora
Award	Year	Category	Result	Ref.
Billboard Latin Music Awards	2020	Regional Mexican Album of the Year	Nominated	
Latin American Music Awards	2022	Favorite Regional Mexican Album	Won	
Latin Grammy Awards	2019	Best Ranchero/Mariachi Album	Won	
Premio Lo Nuestro	2020	Album of the Year	Nominated	

== Track listing ==
No.	Title	Writer(s)	Length
1.	"Que Te Olvide"	Edgar Barrera · Nir Serousse	3:22
2.	"No Te Contaron Mal"	Christian Nodal · Edgar Barrera · Gussy Lau	2:36
3.	"Para Olvidarme"	Christian Nodal · Edgar Barrera · Gussy Lau	2:48
4.	"El Dolor Con El Licor"	Jessi Uribe	3:10
5.	"Juro Por Esta"	Jessi Uribe	3:33
6.	"Por Orgullo"	Los Compadres de Sinaloa	3:54
7.	"¿Quién Es Usted?"	Erika Vidrio · Toby Sandoval	3:06
8.	"Si Te Faltaba Alguien"	Christian Nodal · Edgar Barrera	3:07
9.	"Si Usted Fuera Yo"	Christian Nodal · Marco Menchaca	3:07
10.	"Nada Nuevo"	Christian Nodal · Edgar Barrera	3:14
11.	"Esta Noche" (featuring Sebastián Yatra)	Christian Nodal · Edgar Barrera	3:37
12.	"Ahora"	Christian Nodal	2:17
13.	"Perdóname"	Chrisitan Nodal · Edgar Barrera	2:23
14.	"De Los Besos Que Te Di"	Gussy Lau · José Esparza · Chrisitan Nodal · Edgar Barrera	2:47

== Personnel ==
Credits adapted from AllMusic.

=== Performance credits ===
- Watnaniel Basa – violin
- Sava Catsanich – violin
- Manuel Cerda – arranger
- Carlos Culunga – guitar
- Rene Diaz – cello
- Sviatoslav Girshenko – violin
- Jaime González – arranger
- Ariel Guerrero – violin
- Roberto Hernández – vihuela
- Ceasr Huizar – violin
- Christopher Ibarra – cello
- Hugo Uribe Jauregui – violin
- Tony Jiménez – guitar
- Christian Nodal – vocals
- José Nodal – arranger, trumpet
- Gremier Parra – violin
- Mario Romero – accordion, arranger
- Dezso Salasovics – violin
- Julio Serna – violin
- David Toth – viola
- Ronald Virguez – viola

=== Technical credits ===
- Giovani Ferri – audio engineering, mastering, mixing
- Jaime González – general director, producer
- Oscar Guerrero – design
- Cristiana Nodal – vocal director
- Alejandro Ramírez – audio engineering, mastering, mixing
- Domingo Rivera – photography

== Charts ==
=== Weekly charts ===
Chart (2019)	Peak position
Top 100 Mexico (AMPROFON)	19
US Top Latin Albums (Billboard)	7
US Regional Mexican Albums (Billboard)	1

=== Year-end charts ===
Chart (2019)	Position
Top 100 Mexico (AMPROFON)	92
US Top Latin Albums (Billboard)	40
Chart (2020)	Position
US Top Latin Albums (Billboard)	37
Chart (2021)	Position
US Top Latin Albums (Billboard)	64

== Certifications ==
Region	Certification	Certified units/sales
United States (RIAA)	Platinum (Latin)	60,000^{‡}
^{‡} Sales+streaming figures based on certification alone.

== See also ==
- 2019 in Latin music
