= Nada Nuevo =

Single by Christian Nodal

from the album Ahora
- Language: Spanish
- Released: February 14, 2019
- Genre: Mariachi ballad
- Length: 3:15
- Label: Universal Latin; Fonovisa
- Songwriters: Christian Nodal; Édgar Barrera

Christian Nodal singles chronology
"Solos" (2018)	"Nada Nuevo" (2019)	"De Los Besos Que Te Di" (2019)

"Nada Nuevo" (English: "Nothing New") is a song by Mexican singer-songwriter Christian Nodal released on February 14, 2019 as a single. "Nada Nuevo" was written by Nodal and American songwriter and producer Édgar Barrera.

"Nada Nuevo" reached number one on the Monitor Latino Top 20 General Mexican Songs chart and number twenty six on the Billboard Top Latin Songs chart in the United States.

== Charts ==
Chart (2019)	Peak position
Mexico Top 20 General (Monitor Latino)	1
US Hot Latin Songs (Billboard)	19
US Latin Airplay (Billboard)	6
US Regional Mexican Airplay (Billboard)	1

=== Year-end charts ===
Chart (2019)	Position
Mexico Top 20 General (Monitor Latino)	15
US Hot Latin Songs (Billboard)	75

== Certifications ==
Region	Certification	Certified units/sales
United States (RIAA)	Platinum (Latin)	60,000^{‡}
^{‡} Sales+streaming figures based on certification alone.

== See also ==
- List of number-one songs of 2019 (Mexico)
