= Ayayay! =

2020 extended play by Christian Nodal

- Deluxe and super deluxe cover

Studio album by Christian Nodal
- Released: May 29, 2020 (EP); September 11, 2020 (deluxe); November 13, 2020 (super deluxe)
- Recorded: 2019–2020
- Genre: Mariachi
- Length: 33:02
- Labels: Fonovisa; Universal México
- Producer: Jaime González

Christian Nodal chronology
Ahora (2019)	Ayayay! (2020)	Recordando A Una Leyenda (2021)

Singles from Ayayay!
- 1. "Se Me Olvidó" Released: March 6, 2020; 2. "Ayayay!" Released: April 17, 2020; 3. "Aquí Abajo" Released: July 10, 2020; 4. "Dime Cómo Quieres" Released: November 13, 2020

Ayayay! (stylized in all caps) is the third studio album by Mexican singer Christian Nodal released through Fonovisa Records and Universal Music Latin Entertainment. It was first released as an EP on May 29, 2020, and then as a full album titled Ayayay! (Deluxe) on September 11, 2020. A super deluxe version was also released. The album was produced by Jaime González and features a collaboration with Angela Aguilar in its super deluxe version.

At the 21st Annual Latin Grammy Awards, the EP was nominated for Best Ranchero/Mariachi Album while the title track was nominated for Best Regional Mexican Song. The following year, the super deluxe version was nominated for Best Ranchero/Mariachi Album while "Aquí Abajo" won Best Regional Mexican Song at the 22nd Annual Latin Grammy Awards. Additionally, both the EP and the super deluxe version were nominated for the Grammy Award for Best Regional Mexican Music Album (including Tejano) in 2021 and 2022, respectively, being Nodal's first Grammy Award nominations. The EP was also nominated for Regional Mexican Album of the Year at the 2021 Billboard Latin Music Awards.

The album was certified gold in both United States and Mexico. It peaked at numbers eight and one at the Top Latin Albums and Regional Mexican Albums charts, respectively, being Nodal's third number one in the latter chart.

== Background ==
The album began as an EP composed of seven tracks, released on May 29, 2020, it was followed by the full version of the album, released on September 11, 2020, titled Ayayay! (Deluxe) and composed of thirteen tracks, including all tracks from the EP. A super deluxe version of the album was later released, containing the collaboration "Dime Cómo Quieres" with Angela Aguilar. The projects were recorded during the COVID-19 pandemic.

The album features the use of Mexican slang as well as Mexican references, namely on the title of the album, which comes from the Mexican grito, some tracks also have slangs in their titles like "Mi Chula" and "Mamacita", both being ways to refer to women, Nodal has said that "more than anything, AYAYAY! reflects the essence of my character with Mexican words, the vocabulary [on the album] is very Mexican".

== Singles ==
The EP was supported by two singles, "Se Me Olvidó", released on March 6, 2020, and "Ayayay!", released on April 17, 2020. The third single was "Aquí Abajo", released on July 10, 2020, to promote the deluxe version of the album. The fourth single was "Dime Cómo Quieres", a collaboration with Mexican singer Angela Aguilar, released on November 13, 2020, included in the super deluxe version of the album. "Se Me Olvidó" and "Dime Cómo Quieres" topped the chart in México, additionally, all of the singles except "Ayayay!" peaked at number one at the Regional Mexican Songs chart.

== Track listing ==
All tracks were produced by Jaime González.

Ayayay! track listing
No.	Title	Writer(s)	Length
1.	"Ayayay!"	Christian Nodal	2:11
2.	"Se Me Olvidó"	Nodal; Johan Arjona; Edgar Barrera; Geovani Cabrera Inzunza	2:39
3.	"Amor Tóxico"	Nodal; Barrera	2:10
4.	"Mi Chula"	Nodal; Barrera	2:43
5.	"No es Justo x Él"	Nodal; Barrera	2:35
6.	"Ojalá Fuera Cierto"	Nodal; Barrera; Diana Marcela de La Garza Perez; Luis Barrera Jr.	3:18
7.	"Anoche Me Enamoré"	Henry Medress; Mitchell Margo; Philip Margo	2:19
Total length:			17:58

Ayayay! (Deluxe) track listing
No.	Title	Writer(s)	Length
1.	"Ayayay!"	Nodal	2:11
2.	"Mi Chula"	Nodal; Barrera	2:42
3.	"Se Me Olvidó"	Nodal; Johan Arjona; Barrera; Cabrera Inzunza	2:38
4.	"Ojalá Fuera Cierto"	Nodal; Barrera; De La Garza Perez; Barrera Jr.	3:18
5.	"No es Justo x Él"	Nodal; Barrera	2:35
6.	"Aquí Abajo"	Nodal; Barrera; Rene Humberto Lau Ibarra	2:23
7.	"Amor Tóxico"	Nodal; Johan Arjona; Barrera	2:10
8.	"Mamacita"	Nodal; Barrera	2:14
9.	"Aquí Sigo Tras de Ti"	Nodal; Barrera	2:18
10.	"Nace un Borracho"	Nodal; Barrera; Rene Humberto Lau Ibarra	2:56
11.	"Mi Ex"	Nodal; Barrera	2:28
12.	"Venganza Cumplida"	Nodal; Barrera; Cabrera Inzunza	2:46
13.	"Anoche Me Enamoré"	Medress; Margo; Margo	2:19
Total length:			33:02

== Charts ==
Weekly chart performance for Ayayay!
Chart (2020)	Peak position
US Top Latin Albums (Billboard)	8
US Regional Mexican Albums (Billboard)	1

== Certifications ==
Certifications for Ayayay!
Region	Certification	Certified units/sales
Mexico (AMPROFON)	Gold	30,000^{‡}
United States (RIAA)	Gold (Latin)	30,000^{‡}
^{‡} Sales+streaming figures based on certification alone.
