= De Los Besos Que Te Di =

2019 single by Christian Nodal

Single by Christian Nodal

from the album Ahora
- Language: Spanish
- Released: April 15, 2019
- Genre: Mariachi; norteño
- Length: 2:47
- Label: Fonovisa; Universal Music Mexico
- Songwriters: Christian Nodal; Édgar Barrera; José Esparza; René Humberto Lau Ibarra
- Producer: José Argueta Hernández (Chacho)

"De Los Besos Que Te Di" (English: "Of the Kisses I Gave to You") is a song by Mexican singer-songwriter Christian Nodal, released on April 15, 2019 as the third and final single from Nodal's second studio album, Ahora. It was written by Nodal, Édgar Barrera, José Esparza and René Humberto Lau Ibarra (Gussy Lau), and produced by José Argueta Hernández (Chacho).

== Commercial performance ==
The song was a commercial success, peaking at number one on the Monitor Latino Top 20 General Mexican Songs chart, becoming Nodal's third entry to top the chart. It also peaked at number 12 on the Billboard Hot Latin Songs chart in the United States. The track was certified Gold for Latin music by the RIAA in May 2019.

The song was nominated for Regional Song of the Year at the 2020 Billboard Latin Music Awards, but ultimately lost to "Nunca Es Suficiente" by Natalia Lafourcade. The song was also nominated for the Latin Grammy Awards, but the award nomination went to the songwriters José Esparza and Gussy Lau. Despite this, the nomination is credited to going to Nodal on the Grammy's official website.

== Accolades ==
Award	Year	Category	Result	Ref.
Billboard Latin Music Awards	2020	Regional Song of the Year	Nominated	
Latin Grammy Awards	2019	Best Regional Song	Nominated	

== Charts ==
Chart performance for "De Los Besos Que Te Di"
Chart (2019)	Peak position
Mexico Top 20 General (Monitor Latino)	1
US Hot Latin Songs (Billboard)	12

== Certifications ==
Region	Certification	Certified units/sales
United States (RIAA)	Gold (Latin)	30,000^{‡}
^{‡} Sales+streaming figures based on certification alone.
