= No Te Contaron Mal =

Single by Christian Nodal

from the album Ahora
- Language: Spanish
- Released: September 7, 2018
- Genre: Mariachi ranchera
- Length: 2:36
- Label: Universal Latin; Fonovisa
- Songwriters: Christian Nodal; Édgar Barrera; Gussy Lau

Christian Nodal singles chronology
"Te Fallé" (2017)	"No Te Contaron Mal" (2018)	"Solos" (2018)

"No Te Contaron Mal" (English: "They Did Not Tell You Wrong") is a song by Mexican singer-songwriter Christian Nodal released on September 7, 2018 as a single. "No Te Contaron Mal" was written by Nodal, Gussy Lau, and American songwriter and producer Édgar Barrera. The song tells the story of an infidelity.

== Charts ==
Chart (2018–19)	Peak position
Mexico Top 20 General (Monitor Latino)	1
US Bubbling Under Hot 100 (Billboard)	18
US Hot Latin Songs (Billboard)	10
US Latin Airplay (Billboard)	3
US Regional Mexican Airplay (Billboard)	1

=== Year-end charts ===
Chart (2018)	Position
Mexico (Monitor Latino)	53
Chart (2019)	Position
Columbia (Monitor Latino)	69
El Salvador (Monitor Latino)	35
Guatemala (Monitor Latino)	46
US Hot Latin Songs (Billboard)	34

== Certifications ==
Region	Certification	Certified units/sales
United States (RIAA)	8× Platinum (Latin)	480,000^{‡}
^{‡} Sales+streaming figures based on certification alone.

== See also ==
- List of number-one songs of 2018 (Mexico)
