= F.A.M.E. Tour (Maluma) =

2018 concert tour by Maluma

- Tour by Maluma
- Location: North America • South America • Europe • Asia
- Associated album: F.A.M.E.
- Start date: March 23, 2018
- End date: December 29, 2018
- Legs: 5
- No. of shows: 24 in North America; 22 in Europe; 16 in Latin America; 1 in Asia; 63 in Total

Maluma concert chronology
- Maluma World Tour (2016–2017); F.A.M.E Tour (2018); 11:11 World Tour (2019)

The F.A.M.E. Tour was the second concert tour by Colombian singer Maluma, in support of his third studio album, F.A.M.E. (2018). The tour began on March 23, 2018, in Fairfax, Virginia and concluded on December 29, 2018, in Cartagena, Colombia.

== Setlist ==
This set list is representative of the show on March 25, 2018, in New York City. It is not representative of all concerts for the duration of the tour.

1. "23"
2. "El Préstamo"
3. "Corazón"
4. "Vitamina"
5. "Chantaje"
6. "La Bicicleta (Remix)"
7. "Vente Pa' Ca"
8. "Party Animal"
9. "Sin Contrato"
10. "Borró Cassette"
11. "Carnaval"
12. "Me Llamas (Remix)"
13. "Felices los 4"
14. "El Perdedor"
15. "Pretextos"
16. "Vuelo Hacia el Olvido"
17. "GPS"
18. "Trap"
19. "Cuatro Babys"
Special guests

Maluma performed duets with musical guests on some dates of the tour.

- April 7, 2018 – Inglewood: "Vente Pa' Ca" with Ricky Martin; "Kilómetros" and "Vuelo Hacia el Olvido" with Noel Schajris; "El Clavo (Remix)" and "La Bicicleta (Remix)" with Prince Royce.
- April 11, 2018 – Inglewood: "Mayores" with Becky G.
- May 19, 2018 – Miami : "Felices los 4 (Salsa Version)" with Marc Anthony; "Colors" with Jason Derulo; "El Clavo (Remix)" with Prince Royce; "Cuatro Babys" with Noriel; P Diddy.

== Shows ==
List of concerts, showing date, city, country, venue, opening acts, tickets sold, number of available tickets and amount of gross revenue
Date	City	Country	Venue	Attendance	Revenue
Leg 1 – North America
March 23, 2018	Fairfax	United States	EagleBank Arena	4,995 / 4,995	$477,379
March 24, 2018	Boston	United States	Agganis Arena	5,093 / 5,093	$434,436
March 25, 2018	New York City	United States	Madison Square Garden	12,656 / 12,656	$1,243,577
April 6, 2018	San Jose	United States	SAP Center	12,156 / 12,156	$1,192,923
April 7, 2018	Inglewood	United States	The Forum	25,079 / 25,079	$2,309,254
April 8, 2018	San Diego	United States	Valley View Casino Center	8,941 / 8,941	$688,884
April 11, 2018	Inglewood	United States	The Forum	(Note: The boxscore data for April 11, 2018 is combined with the April 7, 2018 data.)	
April 13, 2018	Guatemala City	Guatemala	Explanada Cardales de Cayalá	—	—
April 19, 2018	Sugar Land	United States	Smart Financial Centre	6,062 / 6,062	$597,022
April 20, 2018	El Paso	United States	El Paso County Coliseum	5,943 / 5,943	$615,525
April 21, 2018	Laredo	United States	Laredo Energy Arena	8,567 / 8,567	$801,625
April 22, 2018	San Antonio	United States	Freeman Coliseum	6,895 / 6,895	$749,083
April 27, 2018	Odessa City	United States	The Hacienda Event Center	—	—
April 28, 2018	Hidalgo	United States	State Farm Arena	5,352 / 5,352	$695,207
April 29, 2018	Grand Prairie	United States	Verizon Theatre	5,505 / 5,505	$574,477
May 1, 2018 (Note: The May 1, 2018 concert in Morelia was part of Expo Feria Michoacán 2018.)	Morelia	Mexico	Teatro del Pueblo	—	—
May 4, 2018	Denver	United States	Bellco Theatre	4,697 / 4,697	$424,272
May 5, 2018	Las Vegas	United States	Mandalay Bay Events Center	8,035 / 8,035	$769,858
May 6, 2018	Phoenix	United States	Comerica Theatre	4,782 / 4,782	$490,478
May 10, 2018	Charlotte	United States	Bojangles Coliseum	4,486 / 6,706	$361,497
May 11, 2018	Uncasville	United States	Mohegan Sun Arena	4,700 / 6,771	$267,779
May 12, 2018	Rosemont	United States	Allstate Arena	12,196 / 12,196	$1,095,400
May 19, 2018	Miami	United States	American Airlines Arena	13,692 / 13,692	$1,060,002
May 20, 2018	Orlando	United States	Amway Center	5,372 / 5,372	$523,908
May 26, 2018	Veracruz	Mexico	Estadio Luis Pirata Fuente	—	—
Leg 2 – Asia and Europe
June 28, 2018	Tel Aviv	Israel	Yarkon Park	—	—
June 30, 2018 (Note: The June 30, 2018 concert in Bucharest is part of El Carrusel Festival.)	Bucharest	Romania	Romexpo	—	—
Leg 3 – North and South America
August 2, 2018 (Note: The August 2, 2018 concert in Lima is part of Junto2 Festival.)	Lima	Peru	Estadio Monumental "U"	—	—
August 3, 2018 (Note: The August 3, 2018 concert in Arequipa is part of Arequipa's anniversary festivities.)	Arequipa	Peru	Jardín de La Cerveza	—	—
August 5, 2018	Santa Cruz	Bolivia	Estadio Juan Carlos Durán	—	—
August 11, 2018 (Note: The August 11, 2018 concert in Chicago is part of the Lit Off Music Festival.)	Chicago	United States	Union Park	—	—
August 15, 2018	Santo Domingo	Dominican Republic	Palacio de los Deportes	—	—
August 17, 2018 (Note: The August 17, 2018 concert in Dallas is part of the Latino Mix Live Festival.)	Dallas	United States	Dos Equis Pavilion	—	—
Leg 4 – Europe
September 4, 2018 (Note: The June 4, 2018 concert in Palencia is part of the Fiestas de San Antolín de Palencia.)	Palencia	Spain	Estadio Nueva Balastera	—	—
September 6, 2018	Madrid	Spain	WiZink Center	—	—
September 7, 2018	Málaga	Spain	Auditorio del Cortijo de Torres	—	—
September 8, 2018	Seville	Spain	Estadio de La Cartuja	—	—
September 11, 2018	Acireale	Italy	Pal'Art Hotel	—	—
September 14, 2018	Valencia	Spain	Plaza de Toros de Valencia	—	—
September 15, 2018	Barcelona	Spain	Palau Sant Jordi	—	—
September 20, 2018	Toulouse	France	Zénith de Toulouse	—	—
September 22, 2018	Amsterdam	Netherlands	Ziggo Dome	—	—
September 25, 2018	Paris	France	AccorHotels Arena	—	—
September 27, 2018	London	England	Wembley Arena	—	—
September 29, 2018	Brussels	Belgium	Palais 12	—	—
October 2, 2018	Hamburg	Germany	Alsterdorfer Sporthalle	—	—
October 3, 2018	Berlin	Germany	Mercedes-Benz Arena	—	—
October 5, 2018	Zürich	Switzerland	Hallenstadion	—	—
October 6, 2018	Munich	Germany	Olympiahalle	—	—
October 7, 2018	Oberhausen	Germany	König Pilsener Arena	—	—
October 9, 2018	Frankfurt	Germany	Festhalle Frankfurt	—	—
October 11, 2018	Naples	Italy	Palapartenope	—	—
October 12, 2018	Rome	Italy	Fiera di Roma	—	—
October 13, 2018	Milan	Italy	PalaYamamay	—	—
Leg 5 – Latin America
October 18, 2018	Puebla City	Mexico	Acrópolis Puebla	—	—
October 31, 2018	Panama City	Panama	Roberto Durán Arena	—	—
November 3, 2018	Medellín	Colombia	Plaza de Toros La Macarena	—	—
November 10, 2018	Bogotá	Colombia	Movistar Arena Bogotá	—	—
November 17, 2018	Buenos Aires	Argentina	Hipódromo Argentino de Palermo	—	—
November 19, 2018	Montevideo	Uruguay	Antel Arena	—	—
November 22, 2018	Antofagasta	Chile	Estadio Calvo y Bascuñan	—	—
November 24, 2018	Santiago	Chile	Estadio Nacional	—	—
November 25, 2018	Concepción	Chile	Estadio Ester Roa	—	—
December 29, 2018	Cartagena	Colombia	Estadio Jaime Morón León	—	—
