= La Curiosidad =

Single by Maluma

from the album PB.DB The Mixtape
- Released: 27 January 2014
- Genre: Latin pop; reggaeton
- Length: 3:39
- Label: Sony Music Colombia
- Songwriters: Juan Luis Londoño Arias; Jonathan Carlo Rivera Tapia; Eliezer Palacios Rivera; Giencarlo Rivera Tapia

Maluma singles chronology
"La Temperatura" (2013)	"La Curiosidad" (2014)	"Carnaval" (2014)

Music video
- "La Curiosidad" on YouTube

"La Curiosidad" (transl. "The Curiosity") is a song by Colombian singer Maluma. The song is taken from the mixtape PB.DB The Mixtape. It was released as the mixtape's second single on 27 January 2014, by Sony Music Colombia. The song peaked at number 48 on the Billboard Hot Latin Songs chart and at number 37 on the Billboard Latin Pop Songs chart.

== Music video ==
The music video for "La Curiosidad" premiered on 5 May 2014 on Maluma's Vevo account on YouTube. It was filmed in Miami, Florida and was directed by Luieville & Company. The music video has so far surpassed over 230 million views on YouTube.

== Charts ==
Chart (2015)	Peak position
US Hot Latin Songs (Billboard)	48
US Latin Airplay (Billboard)	50
US Latin Pop Airplay (Billboard)	37
US Latin Rhythm Airplay (Billboard)	12
