= Magia (Maluma album) =

2012 studio album by Maluma

Studio album by Maluma
- Released: 7 August 2012
- Genre: Latin
- Length: 56:17
- Label: Sony Music Colombia

Maluma chronology
Magia (2012)	PB.DB The Mixtape (2015)

Singles from Magia
- 1. "Farandulera" Released: July 6, 2011; 2. "Loco" Released: August 19, 2011; 3. "Obsesión" Released: January 26, 2012; 4. "Magia" Released: March 5, 2012; 5. "Pasarla Bien" Released: June 29, 2012; 6. "Miss Independent" Released: December 13, 2012

Magia (English: Magic) is the debut studio album by Colombian rapper and singer Maluma. It was released on 7 August 2012, by Sony Music Colombia. The album was supported by six singles: "Farandulera", "Loco", "Obsesión", "Magia", "Pasarla Bien" and "Miss Independent".

== Track listing ==
No.	Title	Length
1.	"Intro, Magia"	02:14
2.	"Pasarla Bien"	03:35
3.	"Obsesión"	03:01
4.	"Primer Amor"	03:22
5.	"Vámonos de Fuga"	03:01
6.	"Mala"	02:52
7.	"Presiento"	02:58
8.	"Loco"	03:11
9.	"Miss Independent"	02:55
10.	"La Intención"	02:53
11.	"Correr el Riesgo" (featuring Piso 21)	02:42
12.	"Malo"	03:26
13.	"Dos Amores"	02:56
14.	"Farandulera"	02:48
15.	"Hoy"	02:34
16.	"Me Gusta Todo de Ti"	02:30
17.	"Obsesión" (featuring Dyland & Lenny) (Official Remix)	03:17
18.	"Te Quiero Cerquita"	03:04
19.	"Tu Mirada"	03:18
Total length:		56:18

== Certifications ==
Region	Certification	Certified units/sales
Colombia (ACINPRO)	Gold	10,000
