= La Temperatura =

Single by Maluma featuring Eli Palacios

from the album PB.DB The Mixtape
- Released: 11 June 2013
- Genre: Latin pop; reggaeton
- Length: 3:45
- Label: Sony Music Colombia
- Songwriters: Juan Luis Londoño Arias; Juan Carlos Parra

Maluma singles chronology
"Miss Independent" (2013)	"La Temperatura" (2013)	"La Curiosidad" (2014)

Music video
- "La Temperatura" on YouTube

"La Temperatura" (English: "The Temperature") is a song by Colombian singer Maluma featuring Puerto Rican singer Eli Palacios. The song is taken from the mixtape PB.DB The Mixtape. It was released as the mixtape's first single on 11 June 2013, by Sony Music Colombia. The song was commercially successful across countries in Latin America, reaching the top ten on the charts in Colombia and peaking at number 24 on the Billboard Hot Latin Songs chart.

== Music video ==
The music video for "La Temperatura" premiered on 3 July 2013 on Maluma's Vevo account on YouTube. The music video was directed by 36 Grados and has surpassed over 350 million views on YouTube.

== Charts ==
=== Weekly charts ===
Chart (2013–2014)	Peak position
Colombia (National-Report)	7
Mexico Espanol Airplay (Billboard)	36
Spain (PROMUSICAE)	30
US Hot Latin Songs (Billboard)	24
US Latin Airplay (Billboard)	11
US Latin Pop Airplay (Billboard)	8
US Tropical Airplay (Billboard)	25

=== Year-end charts ===
Chart (2014)	Position
US Hot Latin Songs (Billboard)	63

== Certifications ==
Region	Certification	Certified units/sales
Spain (Promusicae)	2× Platinum	120,000^{‡}
^{‡} Sales+streaming figures based on certification alone.
