= List of number-one hits of 2017 (Argentina) =

This is a list of the number-one hits of 2017 on the Argentine Physical Albums and Digital Songs Monthly Sales chart, ranked by CAPIF.

Key
†	Indicates best-selling album of 2017
†	Indicates best-selling single of 2017

Month	Album	Artist(s)	Ref.	Song	Artist(s)	Ref.
January	The Best of 80's Lentos, Vol. 1	Various Artists		"Reggaetón Lento (Bailemos)"	CNCO	
February	Random	Charly García		"Despacito" †	Luis Fonsi featuring Daddy Yankee	
March	La Bella y La Bestia	Various Artists		"Despacito" †	Luis Fonsi featuring Daddy Yankee	
April	Circo Soledad	Ricardo Arjona		"Despacito" †	Luis Fonsi featuring Daddy Yankee	
May	Mis planes son amarte	Juanes		"Felices los 4"	Maluma	
June	Suenan las alarmas	No Te Va Gustar		"Felices los 4"	Maluma	
July	Golden	Romeo Santos		"Felices los 4"	Maluma	
August	—	—	—	"Mi Gente"	J Balvin and Willy William	
September	La vida al viento †	Luciano Pereyra		"Báilame (Remix)"	Nacho, Yandel and Bad Bunny	
October	La vida al viento †	Luciano Pereyra		"Criminal"	Natti Natasha and Ozuna	
November	La vida al viento †	Luciano Pereyra		"Criminal"	Natti Natasha and Ozuna	
December	Creo	Ulises Bueno		"Corazón"	Maluma featuring Nego do Borel	

== See also ==
- 2017 in music
- Argentina Hot 100
- List of airplay number-one hits of the 2010s (Argentina)
