= PB.DB The Mixtape =

2015 mixtape by Maluma

Mixtape by Maluma
- Released: 13 January 2015
- Genre: Latin pop
- Length: 30:50
- Label: Sony Music Colombia

Maluma chronology
Magia (2012)	PB.DB The Mixtape (2015)	Pretty Boy, Dirty Boy (2015)

Singles from PB.DB The Mixtape
- 1. "La Temperatura" Released: 11 June 2013; 2. "La Curiosidad" Released: 27 January 2014; 3. "Carnaval" Released: 25 June 2014; 4. "Addicted" Released: 2 July 2014

PB.DB The Mixtape is a mixtape by Colombian singer Maluma. It was released on 13 January 2015, by Sony Music Colombia. The mixtape was supported by four singles: "La Temperatura", "La Curiosidad", "Carnaval" and "Addicted".

== Track listing ==
No.	Title	Length
1.	"La Temperatura (featuring Eli Palacios)"	03:45
2.	"La Curiosidad"	03:40
3.	"Addicted"	03:35
4.	"Carnaval"	03:33
5.	"Me Gustas Tanto"	03:50
6.	"Climax"	03:33
7.	"La Invitación (Pipe Bueno featuring Maluma)"	03:40
8.	"El Punto (featuring Luigi 21)"	03:38
9.	"Duele Tanto (Felipe Peláez featuring Maluma)"	03:45
Total length:		30:59

== Certifications ==
Region	Certification	Certified units/sales
Colombia (ASINCOL)	Diamond	100,000
