= Marinero (song) =

Promotional single by Maluma

from the album F.A.M.E.
- Released: 4 May 2018
- Genre: Latin pop
- Length: 3:09
- Label: Sony Latin
- Songwriters: Juan Luis Londoño; Bryan Lezcano; Kevin Jiménez; Edgar Barrera
- Producer: Edge

Music video
- "Marinero" on YouTube

"Marinero" is a song recorded by Colombian singer Maluma . It was released on 4 May 2018, as the sole promotional single from Maluma's third studio album F.A.M.E. (2018). It was written by Maluma, Bryan Lezcano, Kevin Jiménez and Edgar Barrera, and was produced by Edge. The promotional single has peaked at number 27 on the Billboard Hot Latin Songs chart and at number 51 on the Spanish PROMUSICAE songs chart.

== Music video ==
The music video for "Marinero" premiered on 4 May 2018 on Maluma's Vevo account on YouTube. It was directed by Miko Ho and Maluma himself. The music video starts with Maluma entering an establishment by himself that appears to be a bar. He then quickly sits down at a table and is immediately handed a bottle of liquor by a waiter. As Maluma prepares to take a sip of the bottle that was just handed to him, he decides to first remove the sunglasses that he has been wearing throughout the video up until this moment. Maluma's eyes are then revealed to be full of tears, implying that the singer is in a current state of melancholy. He then drifts around the bar until he decides to get up on stage to momentarily sing until the weight of his feelings get to him and he slumps down on the stage to light a cigar. The video then ends with Maluma crying and leaving the building.

== Track listing ==
Digital download
No.	Title	Writer(s)	Producer(s)	Length
1.	"Marinero"	Juan Luis Londoño; Bryan Lezcano; Kevin Jiménez; Edgar Barrera	Edge	3:09

== Charts ==
=== Weekly charts ===
Chart (2018)	Peak position
Argentina (Argentina Hot 100)	79
Bolivia (Monitor Latino)	13
Dominican Republic (SODINPRO)	11
Spain (PROMUSICAE)	51
US Hot Latin Songs (Billboard)	27

=== Year-end charts ===
Chart (2018)	Position
Argentina (Monitor Latino)	90

== Certifications ==
Region	Certification	Certified units/sales
Mexico (AMPROFON)	3× Platinum	180,000^{‡}
Spain (Promusicae)	Gold	30,000^{‡}
^{‡} Sales+streaming figures based on certification alone.

== Release history ==
Region	Date	Format	Label	Ref.
Worldwide	4 May 2018	Digital download	Sony Latin	
