= F.A.M.E. Tour =

F.A.M.E. Tour may refer to:

- F.A.M.E. Tour (Chris Brown)
- F.A.M.E. Tour (Maluma)
