= Diablo, Qué Chimba =

2023 single by Maluma and Anuel AA

Single by Maluma and Anuel AA

from the album Don Juan
- Language: Spanish
- Released: March 23, 2023
- Genre: Reggaeton
- Length: 3:51
- Label: Sony Music Latin
- Songwriters: Juan Luis Londoño Arias; Emmanuel Gazmey Santiago; Luian Malave; Edgar Semper; Xavier Semper; Wander Manuel Mendez; René David Cano Ríos; Pablo Fuentes
- Producers: DJ Luian; Mambo Kingz; Jowny

Maluma singles chronology
"La Reina" (2023)	"Diablo, Qué Chimba" (2023)	"Copas" (2023)

Anuel AA singles chronology
"Más Rica Que Ayer" (2023)	"Más Rica Que Ayer" (2023)	"Triste Verano" (2023)

Music video
- "Diablo, Qué Chimba" on YouTube

"Diablo, Qué Chimba" is a song by Colombian singer Maluma and Puerto Rican rapper Anuel AA. It was released through Sony Music Latin Entertainment on March 23, 2023, as the sixth single from the album Don Juan (2023). Maluma Anuel AA wrote the song alongside producers and songwriters DJ Luian, Mambo Kingz, Jowny, BF, Santo Niño and Bull Nene.

== Background and composition ==
In 2019, Anuel AA generated controversy by mentioning Maluma in the remix of "Gan-Ga": Nunca flow Maluma, siempre Real G. At the end of the video of "Más Rica Que Ayer", Maluma appeared alongside Anuel AA, Mambo Kingz and DJ Luian. After the release of the song, the artists were spotted in a music studio alongside J Balvin and Jhayco in March, 2023. Maluma even posted a photo with Anuel AA claiming both fixed their relations and their collaboration is on the way.

== Commercial performance ==
"Diablo, Qué Chimba" debuted and peaked at number 49 on the US Billboard Latin Airplay and at number 45 on the US Billboard Latin Digital Song Sales chart on November 12, 2022. In Spain's official weekly chart, it debuted at number 66. The song also reached the top of the charts in Dominican Republic and Panama and peaked at top 5 in Chile and Ecuador. In Central America, Colombia and Venezuela (Urbano), it peaked at top 10 of the charts.

== Music video ==
The music video for "Diablo, Qué Chimba" was released on March 23, 2023, at the same day the song came out, in Maluma's YouTube channel. It was filmed in Miami, Florida and produced by Maluma and Cesar "Tes" Pimenta.

== Charts ==
Chart performance for "Diablo, Qué Chimba"
Chart (2023)	Peak position
Central America (Monitor Latino)	10
Chile (Monitor Latino)	2
Colombia (Monitor Latino)	10
Dominican Republic (Monitor Latino)	1
Ecuador (Monitor Latino)	10
Panama (Monitor Latino)	1
Peru (Monitor Latino)	12
Spain (Promusicae)	66
US Latin Airplay (Billboard)	49
US Hot Latin Songs (Billboard)	46
Venezuela Urbano (Monitor Latino)	8
