= F.A.M.E. (Maluma album) =

2018 studio album by Maluma

Studio album by Maluma
- Released: 18 May 2018
- Length: 50:23
- Label: Sony Latin

Maluma chronology
Pretty Boy, Dirty Boy (2015)	F.A.M.E. (2018)	11:11 (2019)

Singles from F.A.M.E.
- 1. "Felices los 4" Released: 21 April 2017; 2. "Corazón" Released: 3 November 2017; 3. "El Préstamo" Released: 9 March 2018

F.A.M.E. (backronym of Fe, Alma, Música y Esencia) is the third studio album by Colombian singer and songwriter Maluma. Released through Sony Latin on 18 May 2018. The album was supported by two singles: "Corazón" and "El Préstamo". It also includes the song "Felices los 4". In order to promote the album, Maluma went on the F.A.M.E. Tour in 2018. The album is also Maluma's first trilingual album, containing songs that are written and sung in Spanish, English, and Portuguese.

The album debuted at number 37 on the US Billboard 200, number 1 on the Top Latin Albums and number 1 on the Latin Rhythm Albums chart with first week sales of 15,000 equivalent album units earned. The album won the Latin Grammy Award for Best Contemporary Pop Vocal Album at the Latin Grammy Awards of 2018.

== Promotion ==
=== Singles ===
On 21 April 2017, the album's lead single, "Felices los 4", was released digitally on music stores and streaming services. A notable salsa version of the song featuring American singer Marc Anthony was released on 7 July 2017. The song peaked at number 48 on the US Billboard Hot 100 and at number two on the US Billboard Hot Latin Songs chart.

"Corazón" was released digitally on music stores and streaming services on 3 November 2017, as the album's second single. The song peaked at number 87 on the US Billboard Hot 100 and at number five on the US Billboard Hot Latin Songs chart.

"El Préstamo" was released digitally on music stores and streaming services on 9 March 2018, as the album's third single. The song peaked at number eight on the US Billboard Bubbling Under Hot 100 songs chart and at number ten on the US Billboard Hot Latin Songs chart.

=== Promotional singles ===
On 24 November 2017, Maluma released three promotional singles: "GPS", "Vitamina" and "23". Two of the songs, "GPS" and "Vitamina" charted on the Hot Latin Songs chart where they peaked at number 35 and 49 respectively. Despite the success of the tracks, they were all excluded from the final release of the album. On 4 May 2018, Maluma released the song "Marinero" as the album's fourth promotional single along with a music video to support it. The song peaked at number 27 on the Hot Latin Songs chart.

=== Short film ===
On November 23, 2017, Maluma released a 26-minute-long short film in promotion of the album, directed by Jessy Terrero, who also directed the music videos for "Felices los 4", "Corazón" and "El Préstamo". Named X, it features songs such as "Cuatro Babys" featuring Noriel, Bryant Myers, and Juhn, "GPS" featuring French Montana, "Vitamina" featuring Arcángel, and "23". The latter three of which at the time were promotional singles for the album.

== Track listing ==
Song titles adapted from Amazon and songwriting credits taken from Tidal

No.	Title	Writer(s)	Producer(s)	Length
1.	"Intro – F.A.M.E."	Juan Luis Londoño; Edgar Barrera; Bryan Lezcano; Kevin Jiménez	The Rude Boyz; Edge	1:39
2.	"Corazón" (featuring Nego do Borel)	Juan Luis Londoño; Bryan Lezcano; Kevin Jiménez; Aurelio da Silva; Umberto Tavarez; Jefferson Junior	The Rude Boyz; Umberto Tavares; Mãozinha; Carlos Lago da Costa	3:04
3.	"El Préstamo"	Juan Luis Londoño; Edgar Barrera; Bryan Lezcano; Kevin Jiménez	The Rude Boyz	3:39
4.	"Cuenta a Saldo"	Juan Luis Londoño; Edgar Barrera; Bryan Lezcano; Kevin Jiménez	The Rude Boyz	3:17
5.	"Hangover" (featuring Prince Royce)	Juan Luis Londoño; Bryan Lezcano; Kevin Jiménez; Edgar Barrera; Andrés Uribe; Geoffrey Royce Rojas	The Rude Boyz; Ily Wonder	4:01
6.	"Mi Declaración" (featuring Timbaland and Sid)	Juan Luis Londoño; Timothy Mosley; Edgar Barrera; Jose A. Velazquez; Sidnie Tipton; Larrance Dopson	Timbaland; Rance; Edge; Angel Lopez	3:45
7.	"How I Like It"	Juan Luis Londoño; Scott Storch; Edgar Barrera; Jose A. Velazquez	Scott Storch; Diego Ave; Lopez	2:51
8.	"Marinero"	Juan Luis Londoño; Bryan Lezcano; Kevin Jiménez; Edgar Barrera	Edge	3:09
9.	"Delincuente"	Juan Luis Londoño; Bryan Lezcano; Kevin Jiménez; Edgar Barrera; Stiven Rojas	The Rude Boyz	3:26
10.	"Condena"	Juan Luis Londoño; Bryan Lezcano; Kevin Jiménez; Edgar Barrera; Stiven Rojas	The Rude Boyz	3:29
11.	"Ojos Que No Ven"	Juan Luis Londoño; Edgar Barrera; Bryan Lezcano; Kevin Jiménez; Stiven Rojas	The Rude Boyz	3:40
12.	"La Ex" (featuring Jason Derulo)	Juan Luis Londoño Arias; Jason Desrouleaux; Bryan Lezcano; Edwin "Lil Eddie" Serrano; Kevin Jiménez; Stiven Rojas	The Rude Boyz; Lil Eddie	3:11
13.	"Unfollow"	Juan Luis Londoño Arias; Édgar Barrera; Giencarlos Rivera Tapia; Jonathan Carlo Rivera Tapia	Madmusick	3:21
14.	"Felices los 4" (bonus track)	Juan Luis Londoño; Servando Primera; Mario Cáseres; Kevin Jiménez; Bryan Lezcano; Stiven Rojas; Andrés Uribe; Eli Palacios	The Rude Boyz	3:49
15.	"Felices los 4" (salsa version; featuring Marc Anthony) (bonus track)	Juan Luis Londoño; Servando Primera; Mario Cáseres; Kevin Jiménez; Bryan Lezcano; Stiven Rojas; Andrés Uribe; Eli Palacios; Marco Antonio Muñiz	The Rude Boyz; Sergio George	4:02
Total length:				50:23

== Personnel ==
Musicians

- Maluma – vocals
- Edgar Barrera – piano (track 1), guitar (3, 4, 6, 11, 13)
- Angel Lopez – guitar (track 6)
- Eddy López – trumpet (track 6)
- Dan Warner – guitar (track 8)
- Andrés Uribe – guitar (track 11)
- Diego Giraldo – background vocals (track 15)
- Lenny Fierro – background vocals (track 15)
- William DuVall – background vocals (track 15)
- Rubén Rodriguez – bass guitar (track 15)
- Richie Carrasco – bongos, cowbell (track 15)
- Jimmie Morales – congas (track 15)
- Sergio George – piano (track 15)
- Jorge Díaz – trombone (track 15)
- Jesús Alonso – trumpet (track 15)

Technical

- Chris Athens – mastering
- Mike Fuller – mastering (track 2)
- Dave Kutch – mastering (track 3)
- Chris Gehringer – mastering (track 14)
- Adam Ayan – mastering (track 15)
- Luis Barrera Jr. – mixing (tracks 1, 3), engineering (5)
- Alejandro "Mosty" Patiño – mixing (tracks 2, 14)
- Jaycen Joshua – mixing (tracks 4–13)
- Juan Mario Aracil – mixing, engineering (track 15)
- Edgar Barrera – engineering (tracks 1–11, 13)
- Chan El Genio – engineering (tracks 1–5, 8–12, 14)
- Kevin ADG – engineering (tracks 2–5, 8–12)
- Josh the Secret Code – engineering (track 6)
- Matt Anthony – engineering (track 6)
- Dan Warner – engineering (track 8)
- Rolando Alejandro – engineering (track 15)
- David Nakaji – engineering assistance (tracks 4, 5)
- Jacob Richards – engineering assistance (tracks 4–12)
- Rashawn Mclean – engineering assistance (tracks 4–12)

Visuals

- Cesar "Tes" Pimienta – artwork
- Dennis Leupold – photography

== Charts ==
=== Weekly charts ===
Chart (2018)	Peak position
Belgian Albums (Ultratop Flanders)	88
Belgian Albums (Ultratop Wallonia)	58
Dutch Albums (Album Top 100)	86
French Albums (SNEP)	111
German Albums (Offizielle Top 100)	74
Italian Albums (FIMI)	16
Mexico (AMPROFON)	10
Polish Albums (ZPAV)	42
Spanish Albums (PROMUSICAE)	6
Swiss Albums (Schweizer Hitparade)	12
US Billboard 200	37
US Top Latin Albums (Billboard)	1
US Latin Rhythm Albums (Billboard)	1

=== Year-end charts ===
Chart (2018)	Position
Spanish Albums (PROMUSICAE)	80
US Top Latin Albums (Billboard)	10
Chart (2019)	Position
US Top Latin Albums (Billboard)	17
Chart (2020)	Position
US Top Latin Albums (Billboard)	50

== Certifications ==
Region	Certification	Certified units/sales
Brazil (Pro-Música Brasil)	Platinum	40,000^{‡}
Colombia	3× Platinum	
Italy (FIMI)	Gold	25,000^{‡}
Mexico (AMPROFON)	4× Platinum	240,000^{‡}
Poland (ZPAV)	Gold	10,000^{‡}
Switzerland (IFPI Switzerland)	Gold	10,000^{‡}
United States (RIAA)	14× Platinum (Latin)	840,000^{‡}
^{‡} Sales+streaming figures based on certification alone.

== Release history ==
List of regions, release dates, formats, labels and references
Region	Date	Formats	Label	Ref.
United States	18 May 2018	CD; digital download; streaming	Sony Latin	
