= El Préstamo =

Single by Maluma

from the album F.A.M.E.
- Language: Spanish
- English title: "The Loan"
- Released: 9 March 2018
- Length: 3:39
- Label: Sony Latin
- Songwriters: Juan Luis Londoño; Kevin Jiménez; Bryan Lezcano; Edgar Barrera
- Producers: The Rude Boyz; Edge

Maluma singles chronology
"Sólo Mía" (2018)	"El Préstamo" (2018)	"El Clavo (Remix)" (2018)

Music video
- "El Préstamo" on YouTube

"El Préstamo" (transl. "The Loan") is a song recorded by Colombian singer Maluma. It was released on 9 March 2018, as the third single from Maluma's third studio album F.A.M.E. (2018). It was written by Maluma, Bryan Lezcano, Kevin Jimenez and Edgar Barrera, and produced by the Rude Boyz and Edge.

== Music video ==
The music video for "El Préstamo" premiered on 9 March 2018 on Maluma's Vevo account on YouTube. It was directed by Jessy Terrero and it features American model Jenny Watwood. The video begins with Maluma and his girlfriend (Watwood) in a motel room where he is having a call and then tells Watwood to be prepared for tomorrow. The video then shifts to Maluma and Watwood entering a bank disguised as a wealthy couple in order to gain access to the bank's safe. Putting their plan into motion, he and Watwood break into the bank that night using a red gas bomb and proceed to steal a large amount of money. As Maluma and Watwood escape, two police cars approach them with Watwood overpowering them with a gun. The video ends with Watwood who betrays Maluma by abandoning him to the police, keeping the money for herself and the video cuts to black with the words "To Be Continued" just as he kneels down with two guns and is ordered to come out with his hands up, thus leaving his fate unknown.

== Track listing ==
Digital download
No.	Title	Writer(s)	Producer(s)	Length
1.	"El Préstamo"	Juan Luis Londoño; Kevin Jiménez; Bryan Lezcano; Edgar Barrera	Rude Boyz	3:39

== Charts ==
=== Weekly charts ===
Chart (2018)	Peak position
Argentina (Monitor Latino)	6
Bolivia (Monitor Latino)	5
Chile (Monitor Latino)	10
Colombia (Monitor Latino)	9
Colombia (National-Report)	7
Costa Rica (Monitor Latino)	16
Dominican Republic (Monitor Latino)	16
Ecuador (National-Report)	1
El Salvador (Monitor Latino)	10
France (SNEP)	168
Guatemala (Monitor Latino)	9
Honduras (Monitor Latino)	9
Italy (FIMI)	74
Mexico Airplay (Billboard)	1
Paraguay (Monitor Latino)	1
Portugal (AFP)	83
Romania (Airplay 100)	2
Romania Airplay (Media Forest)	1
Slovakia Airplay (ČNS IFPI)	9
Spain (PROMUSICAE)	10
Switzerland (Schweizer Hitparade)	68
US Bubbling Under Hot 100 (Billboard)	8
US Hot Latin Songs (Billboard)	10
US Latin Airplay (Billboard)	1
US Latin Rhythm Airplay (Billboard)	1
Venezuela (Monitor Latino)	1

=== Year-end charts ===
Chart (2018)	Position
Argentina (Monitor Latino)	23
Portugal Full Track Downloads (AFP)	133
Romania (Airplay 100)	14
Spain (PROMUSICAE)	44
US Hot Latin Songs (Billboard)	21

== Certifications ==
Region	Certification	Certified units/sales
Brazil (Pro-Música Brasil)	Platinum	40,000^{‡}
Italy (FIMI)	Gold	25,000^{‡}
Mexico (AMPROFON)	Diamond	300,000^{‡}
Poland (ZPAV)	Gold	10,000^{‡}
Portugal (AFP)	Gold	5,000^{‡}
Spain (Promusicae)	2× Platinum	120,000^{‡}
United States (RIAA)	8× Platinum (Latin)	480,000^{‡}
^{‡} Sales+streaming figures based on certification alone.

== Release history ==
Region	Date	Format	Label	Ref.
Worldwide	9 March 2018	Digital download	Sony Latin	

== See also ==
- List of Billboard number-one Latin songs of 2018
