= Don Juan (album) =

Studio album by Maluma
- Released: August 25, 2023
- Recorded: 2021–2023
- Length: 74:55
- Language: Spanish
- Label: Sony Latin
- Producer: MadMusick; The Rudeboyz; Ily Wonder; Nyal; Erick Ant; Cauty; Keityn; L.E.X.V.Z; Casta; Romeo Santos; Feldalove; Gordo; Ovy on the Drums; Edgar Barrera; Noise Up; Filly; S2Kizzy; Maluma; Marc Anthony; Sergio George; Rude Boyz; Alejandro Robledo; Ciey; DJ Luian; Mambo Kingz; Jowny

Maluma chronology
The Love & Sex Tape (2022)	Don Juan (2023)	Loco X Volver (2026)

Singles from Don Juan
- 1. "Sobrio" Released: July 8, 2021; 2. "Mama Tetema" Released: November 11, 2021; 3. "Junio" Released: September 29, 2022; 4. "La Fórmula" Released: February 1, 2023; 5. "La Reina" Released: March 9, 2023; 6. "Diablo, Qué Chimba" Released: March 23, 2023; 7. "Coco Loco" Released: June 8, 2023; 8. "Parcera" Released: August 11, 2023; 9. "Según Quién" Released: August 17, 2023; 10. "Trofeo" Released: August 24, 2023; 11. "Gafas Negras" Released: January 25, 2024

Don Juan is the sixth studio album by Colombian singer Maluma. It was released on August 25, 2023, through Sony Music Latin. Released three years after his previous studio album Papi Juancho (2020), it features collaborations with Jowell & Randy, Carín León, Ryan Castro, Yandel, Gordo, Don Omar, J Balvin, Rayvanny, Marc Anthony and Anuel AA.

Don Juan debuted at number 195 on the US Billboard 200, including number 11 on the Top Latin Albums and number 5 on the Latin Rhythm Albums charts with 8,000 album-equivalent units.

Don Juan was nominated for Best Latin Pop Album at the 66th Annual Grammy Awards.

== Background and release ==
After having released his previous studio album, Maluma began preparing his new studio album between 2021 and 2022.

In 2023, Maluma announced the project titled "Don Juan". On August, revealed the track list, scheduled to be released on August 25, 2023.

== Singles ==
On July 8, 2021, "Sobrio" was released as the album's lead single. The song received great success.

The second single "Mama Tetema" was released on November 11, 2021. The song features the participation of Rayvanny.

"Junio" was released as the third single from Maluma's album, on September 29, 2022.

On February 1, 2023, "La Fórmula" with American singer Marc Anthony, was released as the fourth single and received success. A month later, Maluma released "La Reina" as the fifth single, on March 9, 2023, and weeks later, "Diablo, Qué Chimba" with Puerto Rican singer Anuel AA was released to radio stations as the sixth single, on March 23.

On June 8, 2023, "Coco Loco" was released as the seventh single, and was also a hit.

"Parcera" along with American DJ Gordo, was released as the eighth single on August 11, 2023. A week later, Maluma released "Según Quién" with Mexican singer Carín León as the ninth single, on August 17; another week later, a day before the album's release, "Trofeo" featuring Puerto Rican singer Yandel, was released as the tenth single on August 24.

On January 25, 2024, the eleventh single "Gafas Negras" was released in collaboration with his compatriot singer J Balvin, despite being a song that had not yet been released until five months after the album's release.

== Composition ==
The album consists of 25 songs. The nineteenth track, has been confirmed by the singer but has not yet been officially released. The album is mostly made up of reggaeton and latin trap sounds, but also includes sounds like house, R&B, latin pop, etc.

=== Songs ===
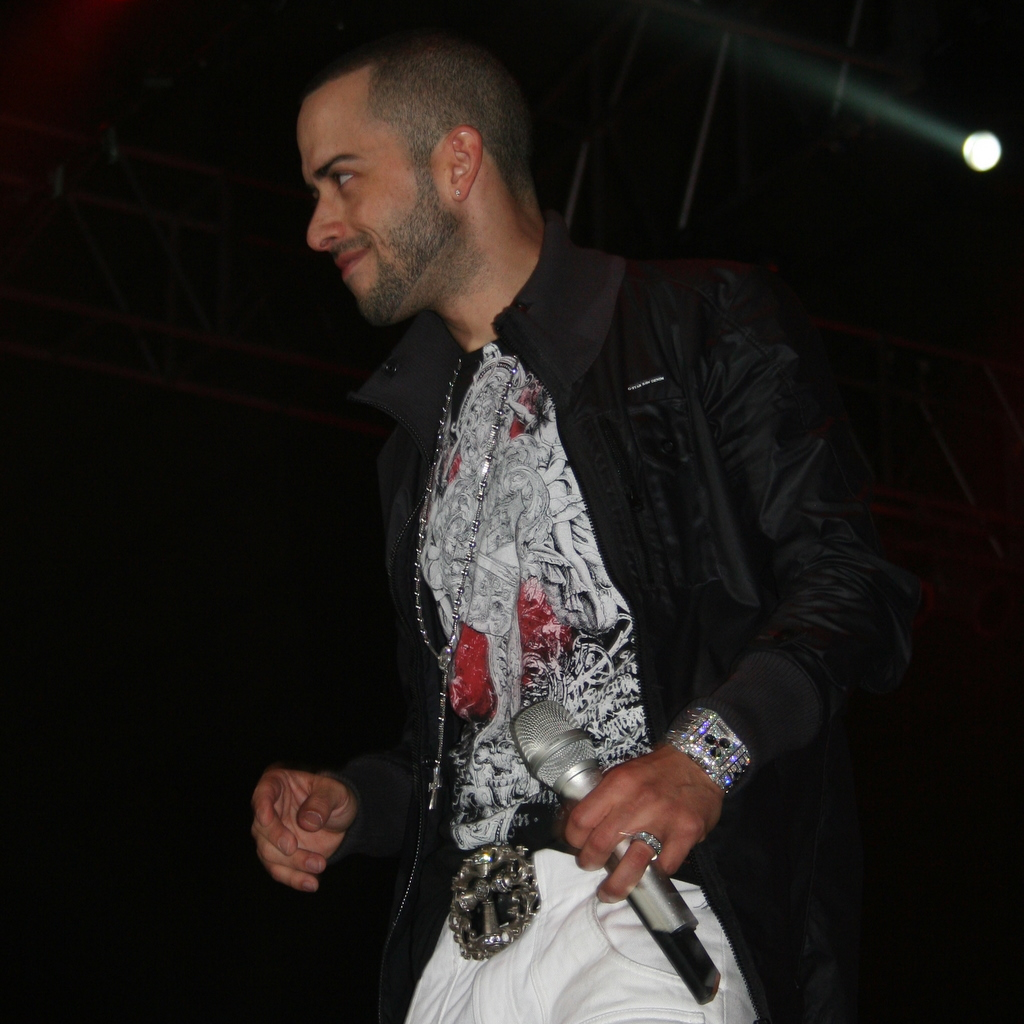
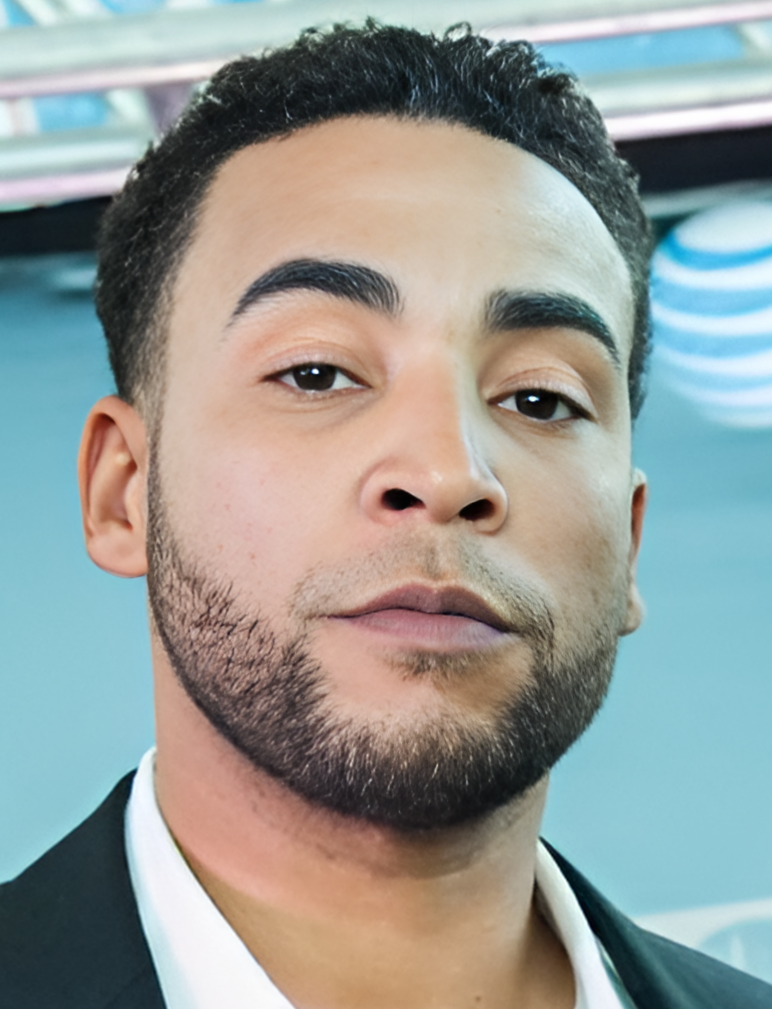
Jowell & Randy (left), Yandel (medium) and Don Omar (right) provide vocals on "Nómina", "Trofeo" and "Ojitos Chiquiticos" respectively.

The album begins with its first opening track, "Don Juan", a latin trap song that also serves as an interlude. The second track "Coco Loco" is an urban merengue song and tropical music containing a sample of a Daft Punk song. The third track, "Ave María" is an electronic dance song that suddenly changes to latin trap. The fourth track "Los Polvos" is a latin urban song with trap sounds. Maluma begins with reggaeton from the fifth track "Nómina" with the Puerto Rican duo Jowell & Randy. The reggaeton sounds continue on the sixth track, "Balance," which also has hints of latin pop. The seventh track, "Según Quién" with the Mexican singer Carín León, is a regional mexican and pop song. The eighth track "Procura" is a bachata and pop song. Maluma returns to his reggaeton sound on the ninth track "Luna Llena" with Colombian singer Ryan Castro. The sound of the same style continues in his tenth track "Trofeo", along with the Puerto Rican singer Yandel. The eleventh track, "Parcera" featuring Guatemalan DJ Gordo, is a house song and electronic with reggaeton elements. The twelfth track "Ojitos Chiquiticos" with the Puerto Rican singer Don Omar, is an urban song with soft touches of reggaeton. The thirteenth track, "La Piloto" where reggaeton returns, with danceable perreo. The fourteenth track "Porsche" is a reggaeton trap song. The fifteenth track "Hace Un Mes" is an electronica song. The sixteenth track, "Aparentemente" is a dembow song. The seventeenth track, "Humedad", where Maluma returns to the reggaeton sound. The eighteenth track, "Bikini", is a gothic, industrial song. The nineteenth track, "Gafas Negras", with Colombian singer J Balvin, is a reggaeton song. The twentieth track "Sobrio" is a pop and reggaeton song. This song received great success. The twenty-first track, "Mama Tetema" featuring Tanzanian-born singer Rayvanny, is a dembow/neoperreo song. The twenty-second track, "Junio" is a tropipop song. The twenty-third track "La Fórmula", with American singer Marc Anthony, is a salsa song. The twenty-fourth track, "La Reina" is a dembow and latin pop song. The twenty-fifth and final closing track, "Diablo, Qué Chimba" with Puerto Rican singer Anuel AA, is a reggaeton song.

== Track listing ==
Don Juan track listing
No.	Title	Writer(s)	Producer(s)	Length
1.	"Don Juan"	Juan Luis Londoño Arias; Edgar Barrera; Jonathan Rivera; Giencarlos Rivera; Raúl Esteban Marrero Quiles	MadMusick	3:06
2.	"Coco Loco"	Arias; Julio González Tavares; Jonathan Rivera; Giencarlos Rivera; Barrera; Vicente Barco; Guy-Manuel de Homem-Christo; Thomas Bangalter	MadMusick	2:47
3.	"Ave María"	Arias; Vicente Jiménez; Andrés Uribe Marín; Bryan Lezcano; Kevin Mauricio Jiménez; Jonathan Rivera; Giencarlos Rivera	The Rudeboyz; Ily Wonder; MadMusick	3:18
4.	"Los Polvos"	Arias; Stiven Rojas Escobar; Erick Andrés Celis Marín; Johany Alejandro Correa Moreno; Jonathan Rivera; Giencarlos Rivera; Teena Marie; Allen McGrier	MadMusick; Nyal; Erick Ant	2:56
5.	"Nómina" (with Jowell & Randy)	Arias; Joel Muñoz; Jonathan Rivera; Randy Ortiz; Giencarlos Rivera	MadMusick	2:21
6.	"Balance"	Arias; Christian Daniel Mojica; Jonathan Rivera; Giencarlos Rivera	MadMusick; Cauty	3:01
7.	"Según Quién" (with Carín León)	Arias; Barrera; Kevyn Mauricio Cruz; Lenin Yorney Palacios; Luis Miguel Gómez Castaño; Juan Camilo Vargas	Edgar Barrera; Keityn; L.E.X.V.Z; Casta	2:23
8.	"Procura"	Arias; Barrera; Jonathan Rivera; Giencarlos Rivera; Maikel Rafael Rico	MadMusick; Romeo Santos	3:06
9.	"Luna Llena" (with Ryan Castro)	Arias; Stiven Rojas Escobar; Kevin Mauricio Jiménez; Bryan Lezcano; Bryan David Castro Sosa; Maikel Rafael Rico	The Rudeboyz; Ily Wonder	3:02
10.	"Trofeo" (with Yandel)	Arias; Harold Alberto Cruz Petit; Jonathan Rivera; Giencarlos Rivera; Llandel Veguilla Malavé; Joan Manuel Ubiñas Jiménez; Roberto Vásquez; Barrera; Barco	MadMusick; Feldalove	3:43
11.	"Parcera" (with Gordo)	Diamante Anthony Blackmon; Arias; Guilherme Méndes Medeiros; Richard Zastenker	Gordo	2:33
12.	"Ojitos Chiquiticos" (with Don Omar)	Arias; William Omar Landron Rivera; Jonathan Rivera; Giencarlos Rivera	MadMusick	3:12
13.	"La Piloto"	Arias; Daniel Echavarria Oviedo; Daniel Esteban Guitiérrez Lopera; Cristian Andrés Salazar	Ovy on the Drums	3:12
14.	"Porsche"	Arias; Stiven Rojas Escobar; Bryan Lezcano; Andrés Uribe Marín; Kevin Mauricio Jiménez	The Rudeboyz; Ily Wonder	2:26
15.	"Hace Un Mes"	Arias; Luis Miguel Gómez Castaño; Barrera; Lenin Yorney Palacios; Kevyn Mauricio Cruz; Philip Kayode Moses; Daniel Benson; Ishola Owolabi Michael	Casta; Edge; L.E.X.V.Z; Keityn	2:54
16.	"Aparentemente"	Arias; Maikel Rafael Rico; Andrés Uribe Marín; Jonathan Rivera; Giencarlos Rivera	MadMusick; Ily Wonder	2:25
17.	"Humedad"	Arias; Barco; Jonathan Rivera; Giencarlos Rivera	MadMusick	2:36
18.	"Bikini"	Arias; Barrera; Vicente Jiménez; Manuel Lorente Freiré; Stephen McGregor; Castaño	MadMusick	2:45
19.	"Gafas Negras" (with J Balvin)	Arias; José Álvaro Osorio Balvin; Jesús Manuel Nieves Cortés; Jonathan Rivera; Barrera; Pablo Fuentes; Luian Malavé Nieves; Giencarlos Rivera	MadMusick; DJ Luian	3:07
20.	"Sobrio"	Arias; Barrera; Kevyn Mauricio Cruz; Alejandro Robledo; Lenin Yorney Palacios; Filly Andrés Lima; Juan Camilo Vargas; Sergio Robledo	Edge; Keityn; Noise Up; Filly; L.E.X.V.Z	3:22
21.	"Mama Tetema" (featuring Rayvanny)	Arias; Raymond Shaban Mwakyusa; Naseeb Abdul Juma	S2Kizzy	3:09
22.	"Junio"	Arias; Kevyn Cruz Moreno; Barrera; Lenin Yorney Palacios; Castaño	Edge; Casta; L.E.X.V.Z; Keityn	2:49
23.	"La Fórmula" (with Marc Anthony)	Arias; Marco Antonio Muñiz; Sergio George; Edgar Barrera; Kevin Mauricio Jiménez Londoño; Bryan Snaider Lezcano Chaverra; Justin Rafael Quiles; René David Cano Ríos	Maluma; Marc Anthony; Sergio George; Edgar Barrera; Rude Boyz	4:28
24.	"La Reina"	Arias; Kevyn Cruz Moreno; Alejandro Robledo; Barrera; Filly Andrés Lima Maya; Sergio Robledo; Cristian Camilo Álvarez Ospina; Juan Camilo Vargas	Edgar Barrera; Kevyn Cruz; Alejandro Robledo; Filly; Ciey; Sergio Robledo	2:22
25.	"Diablo, Qué Chimba" (with Anuel AA)	Arias; Enmanuel Gazmey Santiago; Wander Manuel Méndez; René David Cano Ríos; Pablo Fuentes	DJ Luian; Mambo Kingz; Jowny	3:52
Total length:				74:55

Notes

- "Coco Loco" samples "Veridis Quo", written by Thomas Bangalter and Guy-Manuel de Homem-Christo and performed by Daft Punk.

== Charts ==
Chart performance for Don Juan
Chart (2023–2024)	Peak position
Portuguese Albums (AFP)	100
Spanish Albums (Promusicae)	7
US Billboard 200	195
US Latin Rhythm Albums (Billboard)	5
US Top Latin Albums (Billboard)	11

== Certifications ==
Certifications for Don Juan
Region	Certification	Certified units/sales
Spain (Promusicae)	Gold	20,000^{‡}
United States (RIAA)	5× Platinum (Latin)	300,000^{‡}
^{‡} Sales+streaming figures based on certification alone.
