= Carnaval (song) =

Single by Maluma

from the album PB.DB The Mixtape
- Released: 25 June 2014
- Recorded: 2013
- Genre: Vallenato; reggaeton; soca
- Length: 3:32
- Label: Sony Music Colombia
- Songwriters: Juan Luis Londoño Arias; Giencarlos Rivera Tapia; Victor Roberto Daniel; Jonathan Rivera Tapia; Gabriel Rodriguez
- Producer: Mad Musick Mixer: Edgardo “Mattatracks” Matta at Songo Sounds Studios Miami Florida

Maluma singles chronology
"La Curiosidad" (2014)	"Carnaval" (2014)	"Addicted (Maluma song)" (2014)

Music video
- "Carnaval" on YouTube

"Carnaval" (English: "Carnival") is a song by Colombian singer Maluma. The song is taken from the mixtape PB.DB The Mixtape. It was released as the mixtape's third single on 25 June 2014, by Sony Music Colombia. The song was commercially successful across countries in Latin America, reaching the top ten on the charts in Colombia and peaking at number 6 on the Billboard Mexican Airplay songs chart. It was later included on the track list of Maluma's second studio album Pretty Boy, Dirty Boy, and played as part of the One World: Together at Home concert.

== Music video ==
The music video for "Carnaval" premiered on 30 January 2015 on Maluma's Vevo account on YouTube. It was filmed in Lancaster, California and features actress and model Alyssa Arce. The music video was directed by Carlos Perez and has surpassed over 230 million views on YouTube.

== Charts ==
Chart (2014)	Peak position
Colombia (National-Report)	8
Mexico (Billboard Mexican Airplay)	6
US Latin Rhythm Airplay	20

== Certifications ==
Region	Certification	Certified units/sales
Mexico (AMPROFON)	3× Platinum+Gold	210,000^{‡}
Spain (Promusicae)	Gold	30,000^{‡}
^{‡} Sales+streaming figures based on certification alone.
