= The Love & Sex Tape =

EP by Maluma
- Released: June 10, 2022
- Recorded: 2022
- Genre: Reggaeton
- Length: 27:58: 37:39 (deluxe edition)
- Language: Spanish
- Label: Sony Music Latin
- Producer: The Rude Boyz; Ily Wonder; Lexus; Golden Mindz; Mad Music

Maluma chronology
Marry Me (2022)	The Love & Sex Tape (2022)	Don Juan (2023)

Singles from The Love & Sex Tape
- 1. "Cositas de la USA" Released: January 20, 2022; 2. "Mojando Asientos" Released: March 24, 2022; 3. "Nos Comemos Vivos" Released: June 9, 2022; 4. "Tsunami" Released: August 3, 2022

Deluxe edition cover

Singles from The Love & Sex Tape (Deluxe Edition)
- 1. "28" Released: August 18, 2022

The Love & Sex Tape is the second EP by Colombian singer Maluma. It was released on June 10, 2022, through Sony Music Latin, while the deluxe edition was released on August 19, 2022, with three additional songs. It was produced by The Rude Boyz and has collaborations with Jay Wheeler, Lenny Tavárez, Chencho Corleone, Arcángel, De la Ghetto and Feid, while the deluxe edition also features additional collaborations with Dalex and Brray. The EP includes 8 songs in its standard edition and 11 in the deluxe edition, of which 5 are the singles: "Cositas de la USA", "Mojando Asientos", "Nos Comemos Vivos", "Tsunami" and "28".

== Cover ==
His pet dog Buda appears on the cover of the EP, who, according to Maluma, represents his shadow, considering that it "helps him be a better person" and "has changed his life".

== Promotion ==
=== Singles ===
"Cositas de la USA" is the first single published on January 20, 2022, simultaneously with its respective music video filmed in the artist's hometown, Medellín, by director Harold Jiménez and producer Verónica Vélez. The song was performed at the Medallo en el Mapa concert at the Estadio Atanasio Girardot, in the aforementioned city, on April 30, 2022.

"Mojando Asientos" is the second single published on March 24, 2022, in collaboration with his compatriot Feid, whose music video, which was released simultaneously, was directed by Maluma, who debuts as such, under his own production company Royalty Films and his co-directors were César "Tes" Pimienta and Rayner Alba "PHRAA". It is described as "astonishing" and "leaves relatively little to the imagination".

"Nos Comemos Vivos" is the "tumultuously torrid" third single published on June 9, 2022, one day before the release of the EP, in collaboration with Chencho Corleone, former member of Plan B, which was released along with a "futuristic" music video. According to Monitor Latino, this song has "a lot of flow and a sound that takes up Maluma's street roots". For Rolling Stone, this and the rest of the songs mentioned "offer the reliable and romantic charms enjoyed by Maluma fans".

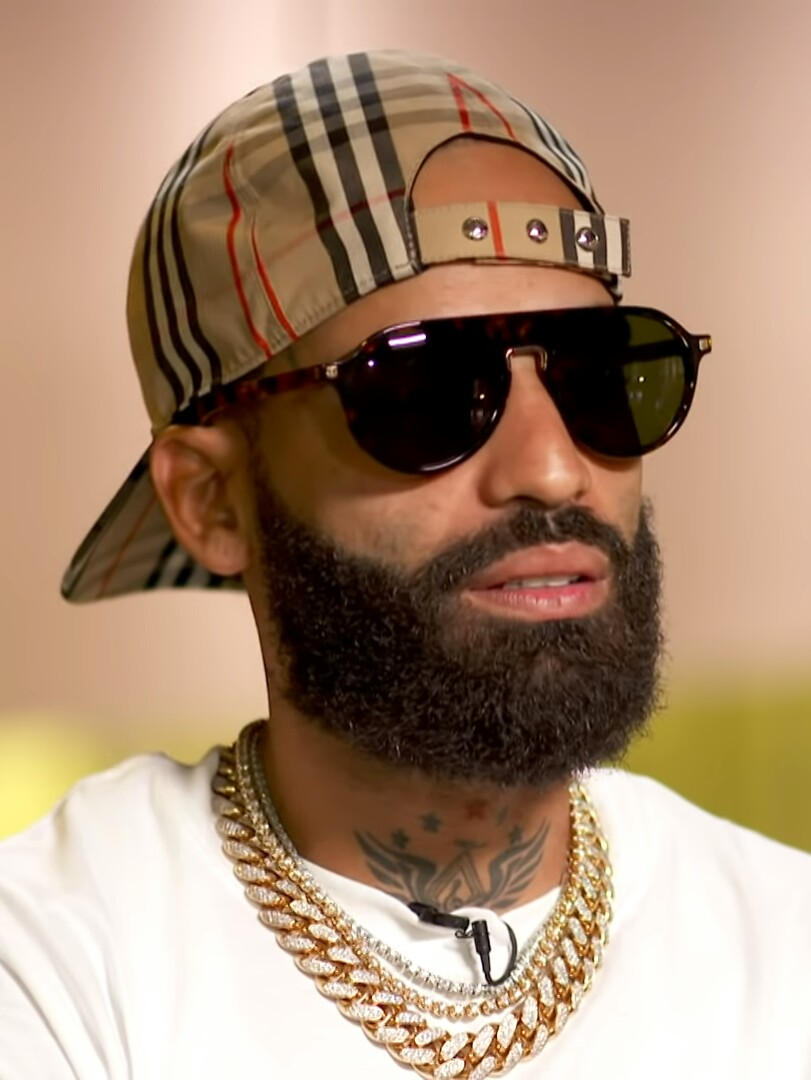
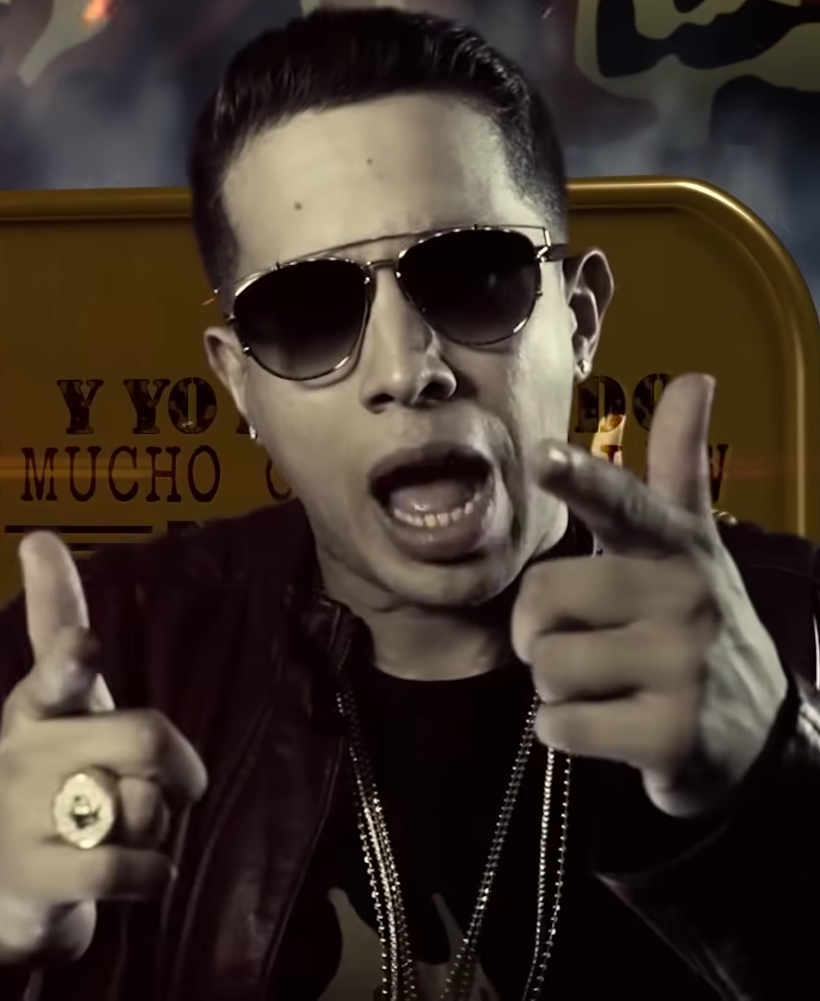
Arcángel (left) and De la Ghetto (right), who formed a duo years ago, collaborated on "Tsunami" which for Maluma is a "dream come true".

For Maluma himself, the fourth single "Tsunami" published on August 3, 2022, which was released simultaneously with its music video, a collaboration with Arcángel and De la Ghetto, It is a "dream come true" by having the participation of two exponents who must be treated with respect and who formed a duo years ago. However, for Rolling Stone "the novelty of bringing together that seminal reggaeton duo on the album [that] had already largely disappeared is relatively unfavorable [...]".

"28" was released as the first single from the deluxe edition of the EP on August 18, 2022 with its respective music video, one day before the release of the deluxe edition, "shows its more urban side".

=== Other songs ===
"Sexo Sin Título" in collaboration with Jay Wheeler and Lenny Tavárez (the latter who is also part of the duo Dyland & Lenny) is the second track on the EP, described as "explicit", which continues after the track "Cositas de la USA". On the closing track "Happy Birthday", the magazine notes: "informed and emotionally resonant of afrobeats, it leaves a stronger impression".

== Reception ==
According to Billboard, Maluma "stays true to his urban essence singing about love, lust and heartbreak, but he does so with slightly more daring lyrics", while for Gary Suárez of Rolling Stone it is a "provisional EP" and "proves to be something too safe for an artist who sports a decade-deep discography". Other media agree in describing it as "the most sexual and explicit of his career".

After the release, the artist noted: "I needed the essence of Maluma from my beginnings. I felt that I needed communication with the street, with the people who enjoy this urban rhythm that has characterized me since the beginning of my career, that's why I decided to make this album. The Love & Sex Tape represents my duality and the urban sound of my beginnings brought to this 2022". And, when questioned about the messages of this proposal, he said: "In life we talk about sex, marijuana, alcohol. I don't think you have to hide anything. What's more, what is inhibited is what one wants to do most. "I want it to become everyday talk about these things and for there to be as much information as possible, so young people can make their own informed decisions".

== Track listing ==
The Love & Sex Tape track listing
No.	Title	Writer(s)	Producer(s)	Length
1.	"Cositas de la USA"	Andrés Uribe Marín; Bryan Snaider Lezcano Chaverra; Juan Luis Londoño Arias; Justin Rafael Quiles Rivera; Kevin Mauricio Jiménez Londoño; René Cano	The Rude Boyz	3:09
2.	"Sexo Sin Título" (with Jay Wheeler and Lenny Tavárez)	Giencarlos Rivera; Jonathan Rivera; José Ángel López Martínez; Juan Luis Londoño Arias; Julio Manuel González Tavárez	The Rude Boyz; Ily Wonder	3:07
3.	"Nos Comemos Vivos" (with Chencho Corleone)	Andrés Uribe Marín; Juan Luis Londoño Arias; Kevin Mauricio Jiménez Londoño; Lenin Yorney Palacios; Orlando Javier Valle Vega; René Cano	The Rude Boyz; Ily Wonder; Lexus	3:45
4.	"Tsunami" (with Arcángel and De la Ghetto)	Bryan Snaider Lezcano Chaverra; René Cano; Edgar Barrera; Andrés Uribe Marín; Austin Agustín Santos; Juan Luis Londoño Arias; Justin Rafael Quiles Rivera; Kevin Mauricio Jiménez Londoño; Rafael Castillo Torres; Rafael E. Pabón Navedo	The Rude Boyz; Ily Wonder	4:02
5.	"Mojando Asientos" (with Feid)	Bryan Snaider Lezcano Chaverra; Andrés Uribe Marín; Juan Luis Londoño Arias; Kevin Mauricio Jiménez Londoño; Salomón Villada Hoyos	The Rude Boyz; Ily Wonder	4:12
6.	"La Vida es Bella"	Bryan Snaider Lezcano Chaverra; René Cano	The Rude Boyz	2:39
7.	"Mal de Amores"	René Cano; Rafael Castillo Torres; Bryan Snaider Lezcano Chaverra; Juan Luis Londoño Arias; Kevin Mauricio Jiménez Londoño	The Rude Boyz; Golden Mindz	3:46
8.	"Happy Birthday"	Bryan Snaider Lezcano Chaverra; Edgar Barrera; Kevin Mauricio Jiménez Londoño; Andrés Uribe Marín; Jason Paúl Douglas Boyd; Juan Luis Londoño Arias	The Rude Boyz; Ily Wonder	3:18
Total length:				27:58

Deluxe edition track listing
No.	Title	Writer(s)	Producer(s)	Length
9.	"Clito" (with Lenny Tavárez, Dalex and Brray)	Bryan García Quiñones; Giencarlos Rivera; Jonathan Rivera; Juan Luis Londoño Arias; Julio Manuel González Tavárez; Pedro David Daleccio Torres	Mad Music	3:25
10.	"28"	Bryan Snaider Lezcano Chaverra; Juan Luis Londoño Arias; Kevin Mauricio Jiménez Londoño	The Rude Boyz	3:20
11.	"Rulay"	Bryan Snaider Lezcano Chaverra; David Escobar Rivera; Juan Luis Londoño Arias; Kevin Mauricio Jiménez Londoño; Vicente Barco	The Rude Boyz; Ily Wonder	2:56
Total length:				37:39

== Charts ==
Weekly chart performance for The Love & Sex Tape
Chart (2022)	Peak position
Spain Top 100 Albums	36
US Latin Rhythm Albums (Billboard)	12
US Top Latin Albums (Billboard)	16

== Certifications ==
Certifications for The Love & Sex Tape
Region	Certification	Certified units/sales
United States (RIAA)	Platinum (Latin)	60,000^{‡}
^{‡} Sales+streaming figures based on certification alone.
