= Vitamina =

Promotional single by Maluma featuring Arcángel
- Released: 24 November 2017
- Genre: Latin trap; R&B
- Length: 4:30
- Label: Sony Latin
- Songwriters: Juan Luis Londoño Arias; Austin Santos; Stiven Rojas; Andrés Uribe; Kevin Mauricio Jiménez Londoño; Bryan Snaider Lezcano; Stiven Rojas; Joel Antonio López
- Producer: Rude Boyz

"Vitamina" is a song recorded by Colombian singer Maluma featuring American singer Arcángel. It was one of the three promotional singles featured in the short film X, and was released on 24 November 2017, alongside "GPS" and "23" as a promotional single from Maluma's third studio album F.A.M.E. (2018). The three promotional singles however, were not included in the final version of the album for unknown reasons. It was written by Maluma, Arcángel, Stiven Rojas, Andrés Uribe, Kevin Mauricio Jiménez Londoño, Bryan Snaider Lezcano, Stiven Rojas and Joel Antonio López, and was produced by Rude Boyz. The promotional single has peaked at number 49 on the Billboard Hot Latin Songs chart.

== Track listing ==
Digital download
No.	Title	Writer(s)	Producer(s)	Length
1.	"Vitamina" (featuring Arcángel)	Juan Luis Londoño Arias; Austin Santos; Stiven Rojas; Andrés Uribe; Kevin Mauricio Jiménez Londoño; Bryan Snaider Lezcano; Stiven Rojas; Joel Antonio López	Rude Boyz	4:30

== Charts ==
Chart (2017)	Peak position
US Hot Latin Songs (Billboard)	49

== Release history ==
Region	Date	Format	Label	Ref.
Worldwide	24 November 2017	Digital download	Sony Latin	
