= Felices los 4 =

2017 song by Maluma

Single by Maluma

from the album F.A.M.E.
- Language: Spanish
- English title: "Happy the 4 of Us"
- Released: 21 April 2017
- Genre: Latin pop; reggaeton
- Length: 3:50
- Label: Sony Latin
- Songwriters: Mario Cáseres; Kevin Jiménez; Bryan Lezcano; Juan Luis Londoño Arias; Eli Palacios; Servando Primera; Stiven Rojas; Andrés Uribe
- Producer: Rude Boyz

Maluma singles chronology
"Me Llamas (Remix)" (2016)	"Felices los 4" (2017)	"Vivo Pensando en Tí" (2017)

Music video
- "Felices los 4" on YouTube

Salsa version cover

Marc Anthony singles chronology
"Olvídame y Pega la Vuelta" (2016)	"Felices los 4" (Salsa version) (2017)	"Almost Like Praying" (2017)

Music video
- "Felices los 4" (Salsa Version) on YouTube

"Felices los 4" (transl. "Happy the 4 of Us") is a song by Colombian singer Maluma from his third studio album, F.A.M.E. (2018). It was released by Sony Music Latin on 21 April 2017. The track was written by Maluma, Servando Primera, Mario Cáceres and Miky La Sensa, and produced by Rude Boyz. A salsa version of the song featuring American singer Marc Anthony and produced by Sergio George was released on 7 July 2017. "Felices los 4" became Maluma's first single as lead artist to appear on the US Billboard Hot 100, where it charted for 20 weeks and peaked at number 48.

== Music video ==
Directed by Jessy Terrero, the accompanying music video follows a love triangle between Maluma, a married woman played by actress and model Natalia Barulich and her husband, portrayed by Wilmer Valderrama. On 5 May 2017, the singer received a Vevo certification because the video became the most watched Latin video worldwide within its first 24 hours.

As of September 2025, the video has been viewed more than 1.9 billion times on YouTube.

=== Salsa version ===
A music video for the salsa version of the song featuring American singer Marc Anthony was released on 11 August 2017 and filmed in Miami's El Tucán and Marion. It was also directed by Terrero and the video continues the plot from the music video of the original version featuring Wilmer Valderrama, Natalia Barulich and model and actress Priscilla Huggins.

== Track listings ==
- Digital download
1. "Felices los 4" – 3:49
- Digital download – EP edition
1. "Felices los 4" – 3:49
2. "Felices los 4" (Pop Version) – 3:34
3. "Felices los 4" (Urban Version) – 3:44
4. "Felices los 4" (Banda Version) – 3:50
- Digital download – Salsa Version
1. "Felices los 4" (featuring Marc Anthony) – 4:02

== Charts ==
=== Weekly charts ===
Chart (2017)	Peak position
Argentina (Monitor Latino)	1
Argentina Digital (CAPIF)	1
Belgium (Ultratip Bubbling Under Wallonia)	33
Bolivia (Monitor Latino)	1
Brazil Hot 100 (Billboard Brasil)	54
Canada Hot 100 (Billboard)	87
Chile (Monitor Latino)	1
Colombia (National-Report)	2
Costa Rica (Monitor Latino)	4
Dominican Republic (SODINPRO)	1
Dominican Republic (Monitor Latino)	1
Ecuador (Monitor Latino)	1
Ecuador (National-Report)	9
El Salvador (Monitor Latino)	3
France (SNEP)	35
Guatemala (Monitor Latino)	3
Hungary (Rádiós Top 40)	36
Italy (FIMI)	48
Latin America (Monitor Latino)	1
Mexico (Monitor Latino)	1
Mexico Airplay (Billboard)	1
Mexico Streaming (AMPROFON)	1
Netherlands Tip (Single Top 100)	1
Panama (Monitor Latino)	2
Paraguay (Monitor Latino)	1
Peru (Monitor Latino)	1
Portugal (AFP)	1
Romania (Airplay 100)	1
Romania TV Airplay (Media Forest)	1
Spain (PROMUSICAE)	2
Sweden Heatseeker (Sverigetopplistan)	8
Switzerland (Schweizer Hitparade)	39
Uruguay (Monitor Latino)	3
US Billboard Hot 100	48
US Hot Latin Songs (Billboard)	2
US Latin Airplay (Billboard)	1
US Latin Rhythm Airplay (Billboard)	1
Venezuela (Monitor Latino)	1
Venezuela (National-Report)	14
Venezuela (Record Report)	1

2024 weekly chart performance for "Felices los 4"
Chart (2024)	Peak position
Romania Airplay (TopHit)	98

2026 weekly chart performance for "Felices los 4"
Chart (2026)	Peak position
Israel International TV Airplay (Media Forest)	5

=== Year-end charts ===
Chart (2017)	Position
Argentina (Monitor Latino)	3
Brazil (Pro-Música Brasil)	72
Italy (FIMI)	90
Mexico (AMPROFON)	3
Panama (Monitor Latino)	2
Portugal (AFP)	7
Romania (Airplay 100)	27
Spain (PROMUSICAE)	4
Switzerland (Schweizer Hitparade)	94
US Hot Latin Songs (Billboard)	4
Chart (2018)	Position
Argentina (Monitor Latino)	69
Portugal (AFP)	106
US Hot Latin Songs (Billboard)	50

=== Decade-end charts ===
Chart (2010–2019)	Position
US Hot Latin Songs (Billboard)	42

== Certifications ==
=== Original version ===
Region	Certification	Certified units/sales
Argentina (CAPIF)	3× Platinum	
Brazil (Pro-Música Brasil)	2× Diamond	500,000^{‡}
Canada (Music Canada)	Platinum	80,000^{‡}
France (SNEP)	Platinum	200,000^{‡}
Italy (FIMI)	2× Platinum	100,000^{‡}
Mexico (AMPROFON)	2× Diamond+3× Platinum	780,000^{‡}
Poland (ZPAV)	Platinum	20,000^{‡}
Portugal (AFP)	2× Platinum	20,000^{‡}
Spain (Promusicae)	6× Platinum	240,000^{‡}
Sweden (GLF)	Gold	20,000^{‡}
Switzerland (IFPI Switzerland)	Platinum	20,000^{‡}
United States (RIAA)	44× Platinum (Latin)	2,640,000^{‡}
Streaming
Chile (Profovi)	2× Platinum	16,000,000
^{‡} Sales+streaming figures based on certification alone.

=== Salsa version ===
Region	Certification	Certified units/sales
Mexico (AMPROFON)	Platinum+Gold	90,000^{‡}
Spain (Promusicae)	5× Platinum	200,000^{‡}
^{‡} Sales+streaming figures based on certification alone.

== Release history ==
Region	Date	Format	Label	Ref.
Various	21 April 2017	Digital download	Sony Latin	
Various	26 May 2017	Digital download (EP edition)	Sony Latin	
Various	7 July 2017	Digital download (Salsa Version featuring Marc Anthony)	Sony Latin	

== See also ==
- List of number-one hits of 2017 (Argentina)
- List of airplay number-one hits of the 2010s (Argentina)
- List of Mexico Airplay number-one singles from the 2010s
- List of number-one songs of 2017 (Mexico)
- List of number-one singles of 2017 (Spain)
- List of Airplay 100 number ones of the 2010s
- List of Billboard number-one Latin songs of 2017
