= GPS (song) =

Promotional single by Maluma featuring French Montana
- Released: 24 November 2017
- Genre: Latin trap; hip hop
- Length: 3:36
- Label: Sony Latin
- Songwriters: Juan Luis Londoño Arias; Karim Kharbouch; Andrés Uribe; Kevin Mauricio Jiménez Londoño; Byran Snaider Lezcano; Stiven Rojas; Mario Cáceres; Servando Primera
- Producer: Rude Boyz

"GPS" is a song recorded by Colombian singer Maluma featuring Moroccan-American rapper French Montana. It was one of the three promotional singles featured in the short film X, and was released on 24 November 2017, alongside "Vitamina" and "23" as a promotional single from Maluma's third studio album F.A.M.E. (2018). The three promotional singles however, were not included in the final version of the album for unknown reasons. It was written by Maluma, French Montana, Andrés Uribe, Kevin Mauricio Jiménez Londoño, Byran Snaider Lezcano, Stiven Rojas, Mario Cáceres and Servando Primera, and was produced by Rude Boyz. The promotional single has peaked at number 35 on the Billboard Hot Latin Songs chart and at number 84 on the Spanish PROMUSICAE songs chart.

== Track listing ==
Digital download
No.	Title	Writer(s)	Producer(s)	Length
1.	"GPS" (featuring French Montana)	Juan Luis Londoño Arias; Karim Kharbouch; Andrés Uribe; Kevin Mauricio Jiménez Londoño; Byran Snaider Lezcano; Stiven Rojas; Mario Cáceres; Servando Primera	Rude Boyz	3:36

== Charts ==
Chart (2017)	Peak position
Spain (PROMUSICAE)	84
US Hot Latin Songs (Billboard)	35

== Certifications ==
Region	Certification	Certified units/sales
Mexico (AMPROFON)	3× Platinum+Gold	210,000^{‡}
United States (RIAA)	4× Platinum (Latin)	240,000^{‡}
^{‡} Sales+streaming figures based on certification alone.

== Release history ==
Region	Date	Format	Label	Ref.
Worldwide	24 November 2017	Digital download	Sony Latin	
