= Maluma =

Colombian rapper, singer, songwriter and actor (born 1994)

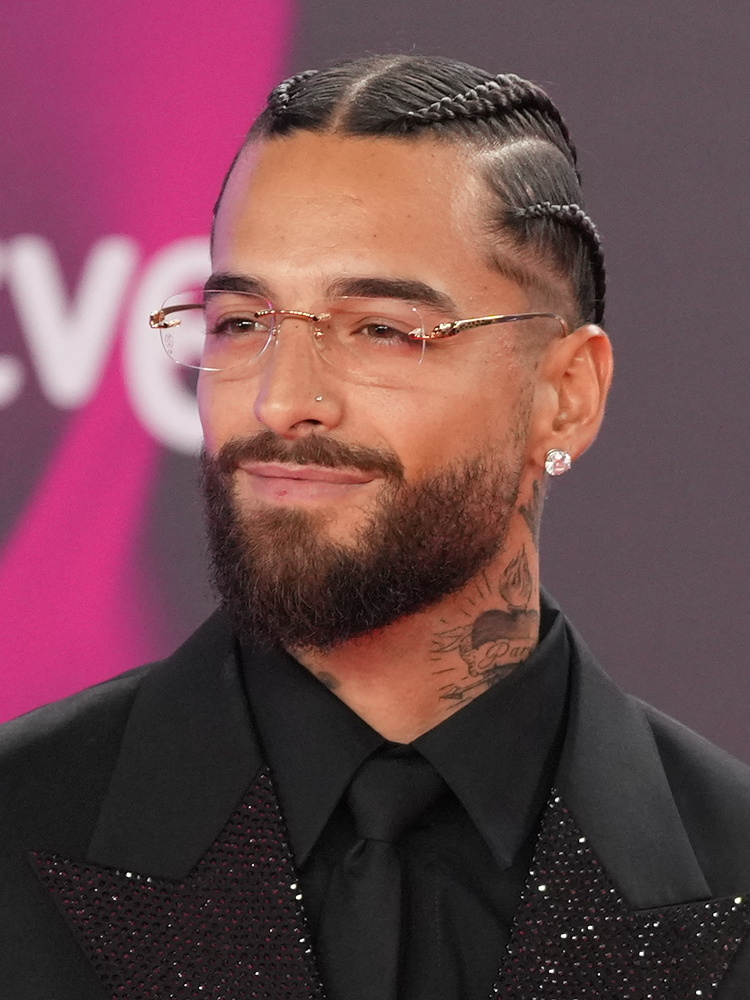
- Maluma in 2023
- Born: Juan Luis Londoño Arias; 28 January 1994 (age 32); Medellín, Antioquia, Colombia
- Occupations: Singer-songwriter; rapper; actor
- Years active: 2010–present
- Works: Discography
- Partners: Akemi Nakamura (2010–2017); Natalia Barulich (2018–2019); Susana Gómez (2020–present)
- Children: 2
- Awards: Full list
- Musical career
- Genres: Urbano; reggaeton; Latin trap; Latin pop
- Instrument: Vocals
- Labels: Sony Music Latin; Sony Music Colombia
- Website: maluma.online

Juan Luis Londoño Arias (born 28 January 1994), known professionally as Maluma, is a Colombian rapper, singer-songwriter, and actor. Born and raised in Medellín, he developed an interest in music at a young age, recording songs since age sixteen. Arias released his debut album, Magia, a year later in 2012. But, his breakthrough album was 2015's Pretty Boy, Dirty Boy, which led to successful collaborations with many artists. He released F.A.M.E. in 2018, another commercial success. He followed it with 11:11 in 2019, and Papi Juancho, surprise-released in 2020. His single "Hawái" (remixed by The Weeknd) reached number three on the Billboard Global 200, and became the first number one single on the Billboard Global Excl. U.S. chart. Selling more than 18 million records (albums and singles), Maluma is one of the best-selling Latin music artists. Musically, Maluma's songs have been described as reggaeton, Latin trap, and pop.

Maluma has a number of singles that have charted within the top ten on Billboard Hot Latin Songs, including "Felices los 4", "Borró Cassette", and "Corazón". His collaborative efforts "Chantaje" with Shakira and "Medellín" with Madonna have reached the top of the Hot Latin Songs and the Dance Club Songs chart, respectively. He has worked with other international artists, such as Madonna, Jennifer Lopez, Ricky Martin, J Balvin, Anitta, and The Weeknd. Maluma has won a Latin Grammy Award, an MTV Video Music Award, two Latin American Music Awards, and been nominated for a Grammy Award for Best Latin Pop Album.

== Early life ==
Maluma was born to Marlli Arias and Luis Londoño and grew up with an older sister, Manuela. He took an early interest in football which he started playing as a toddler through middle school, competing in the lower divisions in the reserve teams of Atlético Nacional and La Equidad. Additionally, he developed a keen interest in music during his early teenage years and was famed as a good singer in his high school. He graduated from Hontanares School in El Retiro where he was encouraged by many of his friends to enter local singing competitions.

Maluma got his first musical break when he was fifteen after he composed, together with a close friend, a song titled "No quiero"; a year later Juan Parra, his uncle, offered him the opportunity to record it in a studio as his birthday present. After impressing a group of music producers, he was asked to choose a name that would be easy to remember and be accepted by followers of the urban genre. He chose the stage name Maluma, which is a combination of the first syllable of the names of his mother Marlli, his father Luis and his sister Manuela.

== Career ==
=== 2010–2013: Beginnings and Magia ===
Maluma began his musical career in 2010, recording singles. After "Farandulera" became a radio hit, Sony Music and its subsidiary label Sony Music Colombia decided to sign the singer to record his first studio album. His next single was "Loco", which was inspired by "rampant and uncontrolled love".

In 2012, Maluma released his first studio album, titled Magia. The video for the single "Obsesión" was filmed at the Antioquia Department Railway Station and featured Colombian model Lina Posada, who had previously appeared in the music video for the song "Taboo" (2011) by Don Omar. So far the video has more than 250 million views on YouTube. Other singles released from the album include "Miss Independent" and "Pasarla Bien", with "Miss Independent" reaching number two on the Colombian National-Report songs chart, becoming his first top five song on the chart. Maluma was also nominated for a 2012 Shock Award as "Best New Artist". The final two singles from his debut album, "Primer Amor" and "Miss Independent"; the latter was accompanied with a music video, recorded in Medellín, gathering 48 million views on YouTube.

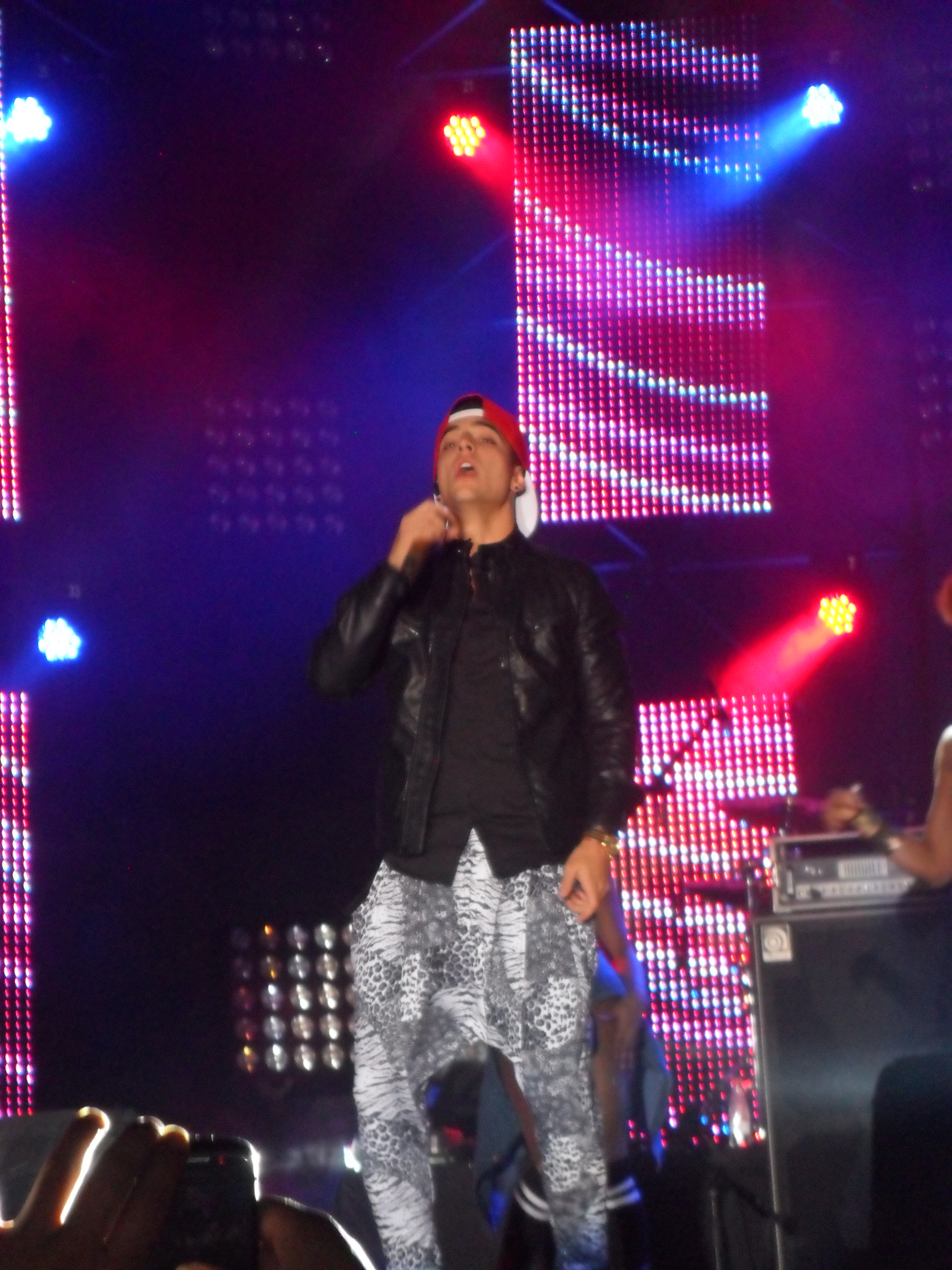
Maluma performing in Bogotá, Colombia in 2014

In 2013, "La Temperatura", featuring Puerto Rican singer Eli Palacios, was released as the first single from his upcoming mixtape, PB.DB The Mixtape; the song reached number seven on the National-Report charts. It also became his first single to enter the US charts for the Latin audience by Billboard; it reached number 25 on the Tropical Songs chart, number 8 on the Latin Pop Airplay songs chart, number 24 on the Billboard Hot Latin Songs chart and number 4 on the Latin Rhythm Airplay songs chart.

=== 2014–2018: Pretty Boy, Dirty Boy and F.A.M.E. ===
In 2014, he released the music videos for the singles "La Curiosidad", "Carnaval" and "Addicted". He also collaborated with singer Elvis Crespo, on the theme song "Olé Brazil" recorded for the 2014 FIFA World Cup. On 16 July 2014, Maluma appeared at the 2014 Premios Juventud, where he performed "La Temperatura". That same month, the singer was confirmed as a judge/coach on Caracol Television's The Voice Kids, alongside Fanny Lu and Andrés Cepeda. In August, he made his debut as a host at the inaugural awards Kids' Choice Awards Colombia of 2014.

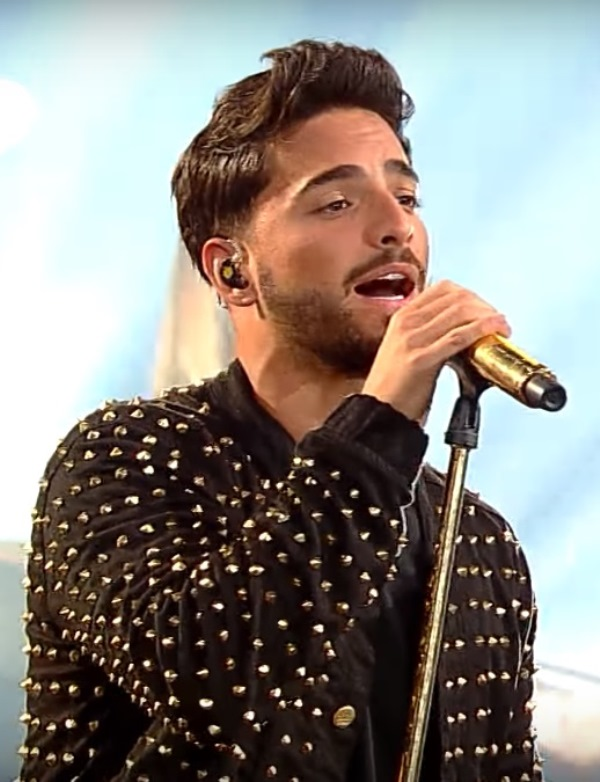
Maluma performing during the Festival de Viña del Mar 2017 in Chile

In early 2015, Maluma released the mixtape PB.DB The Mixtape, a compilation of various singles. His second album Pretty Boy, Dirty Boy was released in late 2015, containing elements of reggaeton, pop and urban music. The singles "Borró Cassette", "El Perdedor" and "Sin Contrato" entered the top 10 on Billboard Hot Latin Songs.

In April of that year he performed at the newly named Riccardo Silva Stadium for the inaugural match of the new NASL soccer team The Miami FC. He then embarked on The Pretty Boy, Dirty Boy World Tour in May 2016.

In 2017, his hit single "Felices los 4" became his fifth top 5 on the Hot Latin Songs chart, followed by "Corazón", which also reached the top 5 on the chart. The music videos for both singles have over 1 billion views on YouTube. He also released the short film X, which featured his songs "GPS" featuring French Montana, "Vitamina" featuring Arcángel and "23".

Maluma recorded the Spanish version of "Colors", one of the theme songs of the 2018 FIFA World Cup, and performed in English by Jason Derulo. Maluma returned to the Riccardo Silva Stadium in Miami to record the video, one of a growing number of artists using the city to shoot music videos. Maluma's third studio album F.A.M.E. was released on 18 May 2018. In an interview he expressed its name means "Faith, Alma [Soul in Spanish], Music & Essence". He worked with producers Jay Cash, Vinylz and collaborators Daddy Yankee, Prince Royce and Jason Derulo on the album. He performed "Felices los 4" at the 2018 MTV Video Music Awards. With "Mala Mia", he topped the Latin Airplay, Latin Pop Songs and Latin Rhythm Airplay charts for the second time in the year, following "Clandestino".

=== 2019–2020: 11:11 and Papi Juancho ===
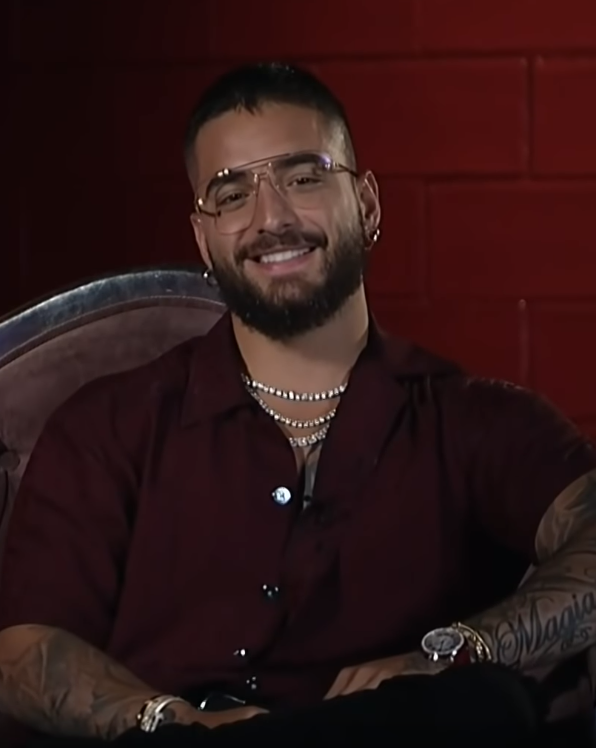
Maluma during the world premiere of music video "Medellín" on MTV in April 2019

In 2019, Maluma collaborated with American singer-songwriter Madonna, appearing on the songs "Medellín" and "Bitch I'm Loca" from her album Madame X. In April it was announced that Maluma will star in Marry Me alongside Jennifer Lopez. He also featured as a voice actor in Walt Disney Animation Studios film Encanto as Mariano.

On 17 May 2019, Maluma released his fourth studio album 11:11, supported by the singles "HP", "11 PM", "Instinto Natural" with Sech and "No Se Me Quita" with Ricky Martin. Another collaboration with Madonna, "Soltera", appeared on the album. To promote the album, Maluma embarked on the 11:11 World Tour, with concerts around the world between May 2019 and September 2020.

On 26 September 2019, he collaborated with Colombian singer J Balvin on his single "Qué Pena".

Maluma surprise-released his fifth studio album, Papi Juancho, on 21 August 2020. The second single from Papi Juancho, "Hawái", became a commercial success. It reached number one in multiple countries and topped the Hot Latin Songs chart for nine consecutive weeks, becoming his second number-one hit on the chart. He also released a remix featuring The Weeknd. The remix peaked at number 12 on the Billboard Hot 100 and became Maluma's highest peak on the chart.

=== 2021–2024: #7DJ, The Love & Sex Tape, and Don Juan ===
On 29 January 2021, Maluma released an EP titled #7DJ (7 Días en Jamaica) featuring seven songs along with their music videos on his YouTube channel.

On June 10, 2022, Maluma surprise-dropped an EP titled The Love & Sex Tape featuring eight songs with many collaborations including Feid, Chencho Corleone, Arcángel. A month later on August 19, he would drop a deluxe edition featuring three more songs.

On August 25, 2023, Maluma released this sixth studio album Don Juan featuring 25 songs with six of them being considered bonus tracks.

=== 2025–Present: Loco X Volver ===
On July 17, 2025, Maluma released his single "Bronceador" which become his first No. 1 song of the year on Billboard’s Latin Airplay.

On May 15, 2026, Maluma released his seventh studio album Loco X Volver featuring 14 songs including four previously released tracks. Maluma describes the album as “the most personal project I have ever created” and said that it “truly represents my roots and my culture.” The album has a blend of pop reggaetón, salsa, vallenato, and acoustic pop. On September 18, 2026 the fourth collaboration with Shakira "Agua" was published through Sony Latin.

== Artistry ==
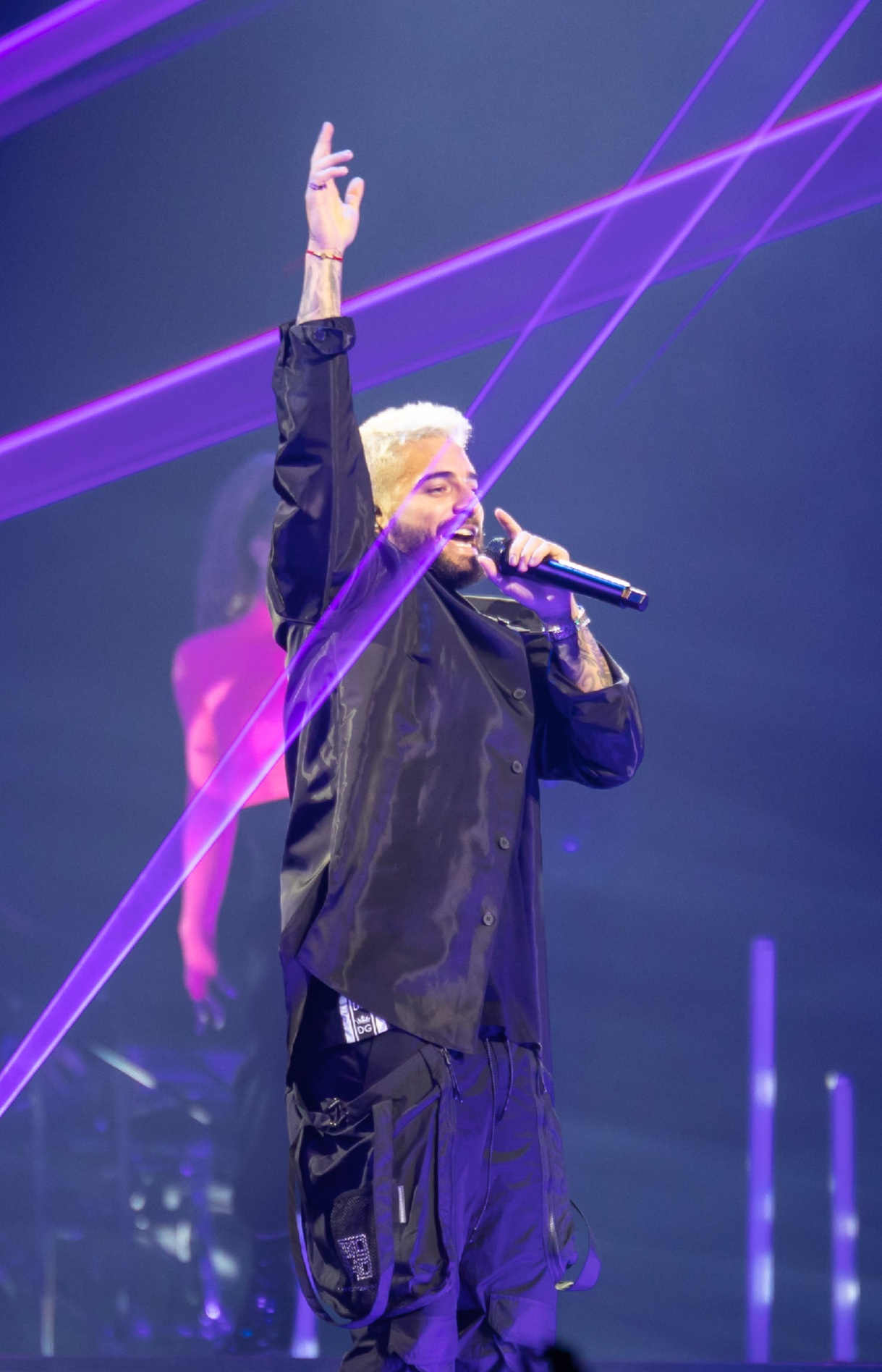
Maluma performing in 2020

Maluma possesses a tenor vocal range. Maluma defines his music as "urban pop". A Billboard editor wrote, "Maluma's brand of reggaetón syncs nicely with his image, managing to be both romantic and raw. His sound represents an evolution of the genre." In a 2016 interview, he stated: "I grew up with this genre [reggaeton] that literally became life. It is one of the genres that I sing... I am an urban performer, I sing reggaeton. If you listen to my last album [Pretty Boy, Dirty Boy] there are ballads, mambo, merengue and reggaeton and underground stuff. I like to show the versatility that I have to perform."

He has cited Héctor Lavoe, Justin Timberlake and Michael Jackson as his main musical influences. While talking about them, Maluma said: "Justin Timberlake has been a great reference for modern music. But as for music as a sauce, Héctor Lavoe was always the number one artist I admired. I know all his songs, I listen to them every day and there is not one that bores me. He is my great musical inspiration." He considers the folkloric elements Shakira incorporated into her music an important influence on his career. He has also stated that Ricky Martin "is one of the artists I wanted to be growing up, He's my idol in the industry".

== Public image ==
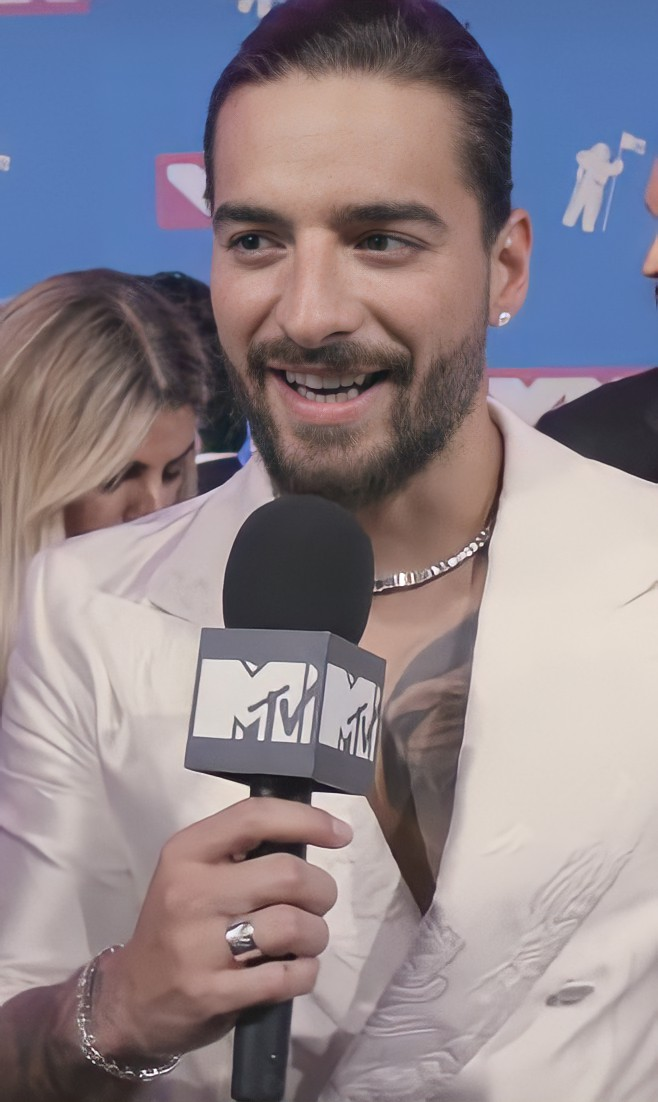
Maluma during an interview at the 2018 MTV Video Music Awards.

In 2019, Vogue called Maluma "Menswear Icon in the Making", saying "Maluma has attitude, Maluma has style. He likes his clothes brights and bold, which goes quite nicely with his bright and bold music, personality, and overall demeanor." In 2021, he collaborated with Balmain on a Miami-Inspired Capsule Collection. In March 2022, he launched a clothing line titled Royalty by Maluma, which is a collaboration with Reunited Clothing and Macy's.

Through his music, he has also carried out social activism, such as the music video for "El Perdedor", where showcased the racism and discrimination by the US police to people of Latin descent living in the country. Maluma has publicly declared his support for the LGBT community.

In October 2016, there was some controversy over the lyrics to his song "Cuatro Babys" featuring Noriel, Bryant Myers, and Juhn, as some considered them to objectify women. A petition was posted on Change.org demanding the removal of the song from digital platforms. Despite this controversy, the popularity of "Cuatro Babys" earned it a 12× Latin Platinum certification by the RIAA.

At the 2022 FIFA World Cup, Maluma left a live TV interview broadcast on Israeli public television after the reporter suggested he could be accused of whitewashing Qatari human rights abuses.

Maluma has done a number of venture capital investments, including TREBEL Music and Colombian proptech company La Haus.

== Personal life ==
Maluma is Catholic, but has said he appreciates aspects of other religions as well.

He was in a relationship with American model Natalia Barulich from 2018 to 2019.

Maluma and girlfriend Susana Gómez have a daughter, Paris, born 9 March 2024. On 10 May 2026, Maluma revealed that he and Gómez are expecting their second child, a boy. On 14 September 2026, their son named Orion Londoño Gomez was born.

== Awards and nominations ==
In 2013, Maluma was nominated for several awards, including for Best Latin America Central Act at the MTV Europe Music Awards, and the Best New Artist at the Latin Grammy Awards, as well as a win for Best Radio Song at the Shock Awards for "La Temperatura". In 2017, Maluma was nominated for two categories at the Billboard Music Awards, including Top Latin Artist. In 2019 he was awarded El Premio ASCAP for Songwriter of the Year. He won a MTV Video Music Award for Best Latin in 2020.

== Discography ==
Studio albums

- Magia (2012)
- Pretty Boy, Dirty Boy (2015)
- F.A.M.E. (2018)
- 11:11 (2019)
- Papi Juancho (2020)
- #7DJ (7 Días En Jamaica) (2021)
- The Love & Sex Tape (2022)
- Don Juan (2023)
- Loco X Volver (2026)

== Tours ==
- Pretty Boy, Dirty Boy World Tour (2016–17)
- F.A.M.E. Tour (2018)
- 11:11 World Tour (2019–20)
- Papi Juancho Tour (2021–22)
- Don Juan Tour (2023–24)

== Filmography ==
Year	Title	Role	Notes
2012	Combate Perú	Participant	
2014–2015	La voz Kids Colombia	Himself / Coach	Seasons 1 and 2
2014	Kids' Choice Awards Colombia 2014	Himself	Main presenter
2016	Despertar contigo	Himself	Guest
2017–2018	La Voz... México	Himself / Coach	Seasons 6 and 7
2017	La Voz Kids México	Himself / Coach	Season 1
2017	X (The Film)	Himself	Documentary film (short film)
2019	Lo Que Era, Lo Que Soy, Lo Que Seré	Himself	Documentary on YouTube Premium
2021	Encanto	Mariano (voice)	English and Spanish versions
2021	12 Hours With	Himself	Documentary on Facebook Watch
2022	Marry Me	Bastian	
2022	Mi Selección Colombia	Himself	Narrator

== See also ==
- List of best-selling Latin music artists
