= List of Sony Music labels =

This is a list of record labels owned by, or associated with Sony Music Entertainment (SME).

According to the Sony Music official website, the main labels are Columbia Records, RCA Records, Epic Records, Arista Records, Legacy Recordings, Alamo Records, AWAL, Santa Anna Records, Ultra Records, Sony Music Latin, Sony Masterworks, Provident Label Group, and Sony Classical, as well as the Nashville divisions of the first four named.

== Flagship labels ==
- Columbia Records
- RCA Records
- Sony Classical Records
- Epic Records
- Arista Records
- Jive Records

== Columbia Records ==
- 30th Century Records
- Alamo Records
- Hypnotize Minds
- i am OTHER
- Reach Records
- Disruptor Records
- Erskine Records

== Epic Records ==
- Cactus Jack Records
- Dreamcatcher Company (South Korea)
- Battery Records
- Vested In Culture
- Freebandz
- MJJ Music
- will.i.am Music Group

== RCA Records ==
- Jive Records
- RCA Inspiration
- Chris Brown Entetartainment (Chris Brown)
- GospoCentric Records
- Orange Records
- Keep Cool Records
- KQ Entertainment (KQ Artists)
- Verity Records
- ByStorm Entertainment
- Nappy Boy Entertainment
- Francis Records
- Polo Grounds Music
- ASAP Mob
- Kemosabe Records
- Roswell Records
- House of Iona

== Sony Music Nashville ==
- Columbia Nashville
- RCA Records Nashville

== Provident Label Group ==
- Brentwood Records
- Benson Records
- Essential Records
- Flicker Records
- Beach Street Records
- Reunion Records
- Provident Special Markets

== Sony Masterworks ==
- Milan Records
- Playbill Records
- Bluebird Records
- Masterworks Broadway
- Okeh Records
- Portrait Records
- RCA Red Seal Records
- Odyssey Records

== Legacy Recordings ==
Legacy handles the archives of Sony Music–owned labels, including:

- Columbia Records
- Epic Records
- RCA Records
- Sony Classical Records
- RCA Records Nashville
- J Records
- Windham Hill Records
- Arista Records
- LaFace Records
- Jive Records
- Buddah Records
- Kama Sutra Records
- Philadelphia International Records

It also handles the catalog of recordings produced by Phil Spector on Philles Records (originally from EMI Music Publishing, which was acquired by Sony/ATV Music Publishing).

== The Orchard ==
- Black River Entertainment
- Blind Pig Records
- Big Future Records
- Century Media Records
  - Another Century Records
  - Inside Out Music
- Cinematic Music Group
- Disruptor Records
- Frenchkiss Records
- JDub Records
- Louder Than Life (joint-venture with Salaam Remi)
- Madison Gate Records (owned by Sony Pictures Entertainment)
- Odd Future Records
- Reach Records
- Shrapnel Records
- SIEGUS
- Soundx3 Records
- TVT Records
- Valley Entertainment
- Xanadu Records

== Sony Music Publishing ==
- Associated Production Music (joint-venture with Universal Production Music)
  - Sonoton
  - Bruton Music
  - Cezame Music
  - Hard and Kosinus
- KPM Music
- Extreme Music
- Remote Control Productions
- Bleeding Fingers Music
- Hickory Records
- Philles Records
- Dial Records
- 4 Star Records
- Challenge Records

== Sony Music UK ==
- Columbia Records UK
- RCA Label Group
- Epic Records UK
- Relentless Records
- Ministry of Sound
- Music For Nations
- 5K Records
- Black Butter Records (joint-venture)
- Dream Life Records
- Insanity Records (joint-venture)
- Magic Star
- Sony Music Masterworks
  - Sony Classical
  - Masterworks
  - Masterworks Broadway
  - OKeh,
  - Portrait
  - Deutsche Harmonia Mundi
  - Milan
- Robots + Humans
- Since ’93
- Sony Commercial Group
  - Sony Music Nashville UK
- WEAREBLK (joint-venture)
- AWAL

== Sony Music Entertainment Japan (independent operation) ==
- Aniplex
- Ariola Japan
- Defstar Records
- Echoes
- Epic Records Japan
- Gr8! Records
- Ki/oon Music
- Mastersix Foundation
- Okeh Records
- Peanuts Worldwide (39%)
- Red Cafe
- Sacra Music
- SME Records
- Sony Music Distribution
- Sony Music Records
- Studioseven Recordings
- Time Records

== Other Sony Music national companies ==
- Arista Records
- AWAL
- Santa Anna Label Group (joint-venture with Todd Moscowitz)
  - Alamo Records
  - OVO Sound
- Ultra Records
- Sony Music Africa
- Sony Music Argentina
- Sony Music Australia
  - Columbia Records
  - Epic Records
  - RCA Records
  - Ariola Records
- Sony Music Brasil
  - Amigo Records
  - Ariola Records
  - Austro Music
  - Blast Stage Records
  - Inbraza
  - LG7
  - Phonomotor Records
  - Som Livre
  - SLAP
  - The Orchard Brasil
- Sony Music Canada
  - Ratas Music Group
  - Jive Records
  - GUN Records
  - X-Cell Records
  - 604 Records
- Sony Music Chile
- Sony Music China
- Sony Music Colombia
  - RCA Records
- Sony Music Czech Republic
  - Supraphon
- Sony Music Denmark
  - Mermaid Records
- Sony Music France
  - Arista France
  - RCA Records France
- Sony Music Germany
  - Ariola Records GmbH
- Sony Music Greece (nee Cobalt Music)
- Sony Music Entertainment Hong Kong
  - O.U.R. Works
  - Green Music
- Sony Music India
  - Sony Music South
- Sony Music Indonesia
  - Floorinc
  - Lululala
  - Megah Music
  - OFFMUTE
  - WeCord Evermore Indonesia
- Sony Music Ireland
- Sony Music Italy
- Sony Music Japan
- Sony Music Korea
  - GLG
  - Dreamcatcher Company
  - Pop Music
- Sony Music Latin
- Sony Music Malaysia Sdn. Bhd.
  - 410 Sony Music Records
  - OFFMUTE
- Sony Music Mexico
- Sony Music Middle East
- Sony Music Pakistan
- Sony Music Norway
- Sony Music New Zealand
- Sony Music Philippines
  - OFFMUTE
  - Waterwalk Records
- Sony Music Peru
- Sony Music Entertainment Poland
- Sony Music Portugal
- Supraphon
- Azteca Music
- Sony Music Romania
- Sony Music Russia
- Sony Music Singapore
- Sony Music Spain
- Sony Music Sweden
  - Razzia Records
- Sony Music Taiwan
- Sony Music Thailand
  - Love Is
  - Bakery Music
- Sony Music UK
- Sony Music Vietnam

South Africa

- Sony Music Entertainment Africa/South Africa
  - South African Recordings
  - Select Records

== Independent labels distributed by Sony Music Entertainment ==
- Albert Productions
- Aware Records
- Black Butter Records (UK)
- Buppu Records (Japan)
- Chrome Entertainment (South Korea) (Note: Korean releases only)
- Constellation Records (Canada)
- Cooking Vinyl (UK)
- Danger Crue Records (Japan, 2012–present, formerly handled by Avex Group)
- Deutsche Harmonia Mundi
- Fair Trade Services
- Hostess Entertainment (Japan)
- In the Name Of
- Ivory Music and Video (Philippines, 2011–2018; acquired by Viva Records in 2023)
- J Storm (Japan)
- JVR Music (Taiwan, 2007–2023; now handled by Universal Music Group)
- Kemosabe Records
- Kobalt Music Group
- Konnect Entertainment (South Korea)
- KQ Entertainment (South Korea)
- Love Is (Thailand)
- Megaforce Records
- MCI
- Midas Music (Brazil)
- Mirror Society (The Netherlands)
- MODHAUS (South Korea)
- Mr. 305 Inc.
- Napalm Records (Canada)
- Nick Records
- CBS Records
- Palm Tree Records
- Shout! Factory
- Starship Entertainment (South Korea except Monsta X)
- Stmpd Rcrds (Netherlands)
- SPV GmbH (Germany)
- Robbins Entertainment
- Round Hill Music (except The Offspring)
  - Black Hill Records
  - Dolores Recordings
  - Woah Dad!
- Drakkar Entertainment
- Tratore (Brazil)
- TOP Media (South Korea)
- Top Stop Music
- Tero Entertainment (Thailand)
- EEM Records
- Warner Music Group (SAARC/South Asian countries except Bangladesh)
- WM Entertainment (South Korea)
- WWE Music Group

== Former/defunct labels ==
=== Columbia Records ===
- American Recordings
- Daft Life
- Def Jam Recordings
- Jam Master Jay Records
- Fever Records
- C2 Records
- LBW Entertainment
- Ruffhouse Records
- Ovum Recordings
- Loud Records
- DIW Records
- Vinyl Solution
- So So Def Recordings
- Skint Records
- Skyblaze Recordings
- Startime International
- Burgundy Records
- Chaos Recordings
- Oriole Records
- Private-I Records
- Bobcat Records

=== Epic Records ===
- Razor Sharp Records
- So So Def Recordings
- Bad Boy Records
- Epic Soundtrax
- Cold Chillin' Records
- Portrait Records
- Immortal Records
- 550 Music
- WTG Records
- Work Group
- Ode Records
- Okeh Records
- Ruthless Records
- Hidden Beach Recordings
- Caribou Records
- Tabu Records
- Jet Records
- Tuff City Records
- Nemperor Records
- Portrait Records
- Sony Wonder (now a division of Sony Pictures Home Entertainment)

=== Zomba Group of Companies ===
- Battery Records
- Internal Affairs
- EBUL
- Jive Electro
- Volcano Entertainment
  - Zoo Entertainment
  - Scotti Brothers Records
  - Capricorn Records

=== RED Distribution ===
- Loud Records
- Ruthless Records

=== RCA Records ===
- Windham Hill Records
- Living Music
- Private Music
- Novus Records
- Loud Records
- RCA Camden
- RCA Gold Seal
- RCA Victrola
- Vik Records
- So So Def Recordings

=== Arista Records ===
- Rowdy Records
- LaFace Records
- Bad Boy Records
- Profile Records
- Kinetic Records
- Logic Records
- BMG Kidz
- Jim Henson Records
- Bell Records
- Go-Feet Records

=== BMG Entertainment ===
- ECM Records
- Imago Records
- V2 Records
- Gee Street Records
- Junior Boy's Own
- Beyond Music (1998–2001)
- Milan Records
- BMG Heritage
- Buddah Records
- Sanctuary Records
- Sanctuary Urban
- BMG Funhouse
- Amiga
- BMG Records Pilipinas/Musiko Records
- Arte Nova Classics
- Conifer Records
- Deutsche Schallplatten Berlin (DSB)
- Hansa Records

=== Sony Music Nashville ===
- Arista Nashville
- Epic Records Nashville

=== Sony Music UK ===
- Sony S2 (Sony Soho Square)
- Silvertone Records
- Phonogenic Records

== Other former labels ==
- Nick Records
- Shout! Factory
- Abril Music (bought from Editora Abril in 2003 by BMG and absorbed by Ariola Records.)
- Jive Epic (renamed RCA Records France in 2019.)
- Pink Floyd Records (worldwide except the UK and Europe; extinct after Pink Floyd's catalogue was fully acquired by Sony and Columbia in 2024)
- Sony Music Israel (joint venture with Oneway Entertainment; formerly with Helicon Records)
- Sony Music Russia
- Syco Music

== See also ==
- Record labels owned by Sony BMG
