= Afro-Romanians =

Total population
- no official data as Romania does not collect statistics based on race

Regions with significant populations
- Bucharest, Cluj-Napoca, Timișoara, Iași, Craiova, Constanța, Oradea

Languages
- Romanian language, French language, English language, Niger-Congo languages, Nilo-Saharan languages, Creole Languages, Afro-Asiatic languages, Languages of Africa

Religion
- Eastern Orthodoxy, Islam, Catholicism, Judaism, Traditional African religions, Protestantism, Jehovah's Witnesses, African diasporic religions, Atheism, Irreligion, Rastafari

Afro-Romanians are Romanians who are of African descent. Afro-Romanian populations are mostly concentrated in major cities of Romania. Africans have been immigrating to Romania since the Communist Era.

The majority of African-Romanians are of mixed ancestry, usually being the children of a Romanian parent and an African student who came to Romania. Nicolae Ceaușescu had a plan to educate the African elites. Most Africans who studied in Romania during the Ceaușescu era came from Sub-Saharan African countries such as Central African Republic, Sudan, DRC, Republic of the Congo, and other states, primarily from West Africa and Equatorial Africa, with which Ceaușescu developed close relations, as well as from Maghreb (see Arabs in Romania).

Since the early 60s, young people from around the world came to study in the Socialist Republic of Romania. The communist state leadership wanted to link mutual friendship with different countries. It is estimated that during the communist era, about 10,000 Sudanese young people studied in Romania.

After the fall of the communism, the numbers of Afro-Romanians increased. Currently, in Romania, most Africans are students, refugees, guest workers or children from mixed-families of a Romanian parent and an African student or worker who came to Romania. In 2020, asylum applicants from Somalia and Eritrea represented the 6th and 9th highest numbers among asylum applicants in Romania.

== Demographics and areas ==
In Bucharest, although Afro-Romanians live in all parts of the city, most of them are concentrated in the Giurgiului and Baicului areas.

The number of individuals with African ancestry is unknown, as Romania does not keep statistics on race. According to mid-2020 UN estimates, most immigrants to Romania from the continent of Africa originate from North Africa, with the most common countries being Tunisia (2,000), Morocco (1,000), Algeria (1,000) and Egypt (1,000). (these are the only African countries listed in that study). In addition, there are also 1,000 Brazilians in Romania and they may have (partial) African ancestry.

The origins of Romanians whose ancestry is from Sub-Saharan Africa are varied. During the Ceaușescu era, the sub-Saharan African students who came to study in Romania were primarily from areas of Francophone Africa and Northeast Africa (especially Sudan), as Ceaușescu had formed diplomatic relations with the leaders of some of those countries. More recently, the African population has diversified, coming from a variety of countries. The highest numbers of asylum applicants from Africa are from Somalia and Eritrea (as of 2021).

== Notable people ==
=== Fashion designers ===
- Joseph Seroussi

=== Modelling ===
- Agnès Matoko

=== Music ===
- Kamara Ghedi
- Veronika Tecaru
- Julie Mayaya
- Tobi Ibitoye

=== Politicians ===
- Gaston Bienvenu Mboumba Bakabana
- Kwame Nkrumah

=== Sports ===
- Nana Falemi - Footballer
- Jean-Claude Bozga - Footballer
- Calvin Tolmbaye - Footballer
- Baudoin Kanda - Footballer
- Yasin Hamed - Footballer
- Karim Adeyemi - Footballer
- Benjamin Adegbuyi - Kickboxer
- Stephen Hihetah - Rugby player
- Giordan Watson - Basketball player
- Uchechukwu Iheadindu - Basketball player
- Annemarie Părău - Basketball player
- Chike Onyejekwe - Handball player
- Nneka Onyejekwe - Volleyball player
- Elizabet Inneh - Volleyball player

=== Television ===
- Cabral Ibacka
- Laura Nureldin
- Nadine Voindrouh
- Désirée Malonga
- Florina Fernandes

=== Media & Entertainment ===
- Ifedayo Olarinde

== See also ==
- Immigration to Romania
- Arabs in Romania
