= Uche =

- Gender: Unisex
- Language: Igbo

Origin
- Origin: Nigeria
- Meaning: Will, mind, sense
- Region of origin: South-east Nigeria

Other names
- Variant form: Uchechukwu Uchenna Ucheoma Uchendu

Uche // is a Nigerian name originating among the Igbo people, which can mean "intention", "will", "mind", or "sense". It can be a standalone name, but often also short for Uchechi, Uchechukwu ("God's will", "God's mind" or Uchenna ("father's will", "father's mind") Ucheoma (which means "beautiful mind"), and Uchendu (which means "thinking/thought of life"). The name Uche may refer to:

== People ==
=== Given name ===
- Uche Henry Agbo (born 1995), Nigerian football player
- Uche Akubuike (born 1980), Nigerian football player
- Uche Azikiwe (born 1947), Nigerian writer and first lady
- Uché Blackstock (born 1977/1978), American doctor
- Uche Chukwumerije (1939–2015), Nigerian politician
- Uche Eze (born 1983), Nigerian writer and entrepreneur
- Uche Iheruome (born 1987), Nigerian football player
- Uche Ikpeazu (born 1995), British football player
- Uche Jombo (born 1979), Nigerian actress
- Uche Kalu (born 1986), Nigerian football player
- Uche Nduka (born 1963), Nigerian writer
- Uche Nwaneri (1984-2022), American football player
- Uche Nwofor (born 1991), Nigerian football player
- Uche Oduoza (born 1986), British rugby player
- Uche Okafor (1967–2011), Nigerian football player
- Uche Okechukwu (born 1967), Nigerian football player
- Uche Okeke (born 1933), Nigerian artist
- Uche Sherif (born 1983), Nigerian football player
- Uche Secondus (born 1955), Nigerian politician
- Uche Nwaezeapu (born 1983), Nigerian actor

=== Surname ===
- Henry Uche (born 1990), Nigerian footballer
- Christantus Uche (born 2003), Nigerian footballer
- Ikechukwu Uche (born 1984), Nigerian football player
- Isaac Uche (born 1981), Nigerian sprinter
- Joshua Uche (born 1998), American football player
- Kalu Uche (born 1982), Nigerian football player
- Oguchi Uche (born 1987), Nigerian football player
