= Chinese Romanian =

Chinese Romanian or Romanian Chinese may refer to

- People's Republic of China–Romania relations
- Chinese of Romania
- Romanians in China
- People with dual citizenship of China and Romania
