= Arabs in Romania =

Arabs in Romania Arabii din România العرب في رومانيا
Total population
- 10,000 (2018)

Regions with significant populations
- Bucharest

Languages
- Arabic; Romanian

Religion
- Islam, Christianity, Druze

Related ethnic groups
- Other Arabs

Arabs in Romania (Romanian: Arabii din România) are people from Arab world who live in Romania. The first Fellah settlers came in 1831–1833 from Ottoman Syria to Dobruja. The Dobrujan Arabs assimilated into the Turkish and Tatar populations. Some of them came to Romania during the Ceaușescu era, when many Arab students were granted scholarships to study in Romanian universities. Most of them were Algerians, Syrians, Palestinians, Iraqis, Libyans, Egyptians, and Yemenis. Most of these students returned to their countries of origin, but some remained in Romania starting families here. It is estimated that almost half a million Middle Eastern Arabs studied in Romania during the 1980s. A new wave of Arab immigration started after the Romanian Revolution. Many of the newly arrived Arabs came to Romania in the 1990s in order to develop businesses. In addition, Romania has people from Arab countries who have the status of refugees (Refugees of the Syrian civil war) or illegal immigrants, primarily from North Africa, trying to immigrate to Western Europe. In particular, the European migrant crisis lead to Syrian people coming to Romania, although many Syrians were already living in Romania at the time of the crisis.

In 2005, it was estimated that about 5,000 Arabs lived in Romania at that time (the number 5,000 includes not only Arabs but also Kurds, Iranians, Afghans, Berber, Assyrians and others). However, more Arabs have migrated to Romania since then. For example, in 2017, Romania granted residence status to 1330 Arabs, most of them from Syria (almost half), followed by Iraq. Most Arabs in Romania are Muslim, but there are also Christian Arabs. Today, Arabs of Romania are from many Arab countries, particularly Lebanon, Syria, Tunisia, Egypt, Iraq, and also small groups from Jordan, Algeria, Morocco, Libya, Palestinian Territories, Sudan, Saudi Arabia, Somalia, Eritrea, Yemen, Mauritania, Comoros, Djibouti who emigrated from their native nations and currently reside in Romania.

The majority are ethnically Arab but there are numerous groups who include Kurds, Copts, Druze, Maronites, Assyrians, Berbers, Africans, Turkmen, Roma and others.

In March 2023, some Arabs living in Romania have started the proceedings to be recognized as an official national minority of Romania.

== Notable people ==
- Majda Aboulumosha, actress (Libyan father)
- Raed Arafat, doctor, founder of SMURD and former Romanian Minister of Health
- Omar El Sawy, footballer (Egyptian father)
- Ahmed Jaber, journalist (Palestinian father)
- Amina Muaddi, fashion designer (Jordanian father)
- Denise Rifai, journalist (Jordanian father)
- Dana Abed Kader, handballer (Syrian father)
- Glance Al-Masany, rapper (Yemeni father)
- Sorana Mohamad, singer and actress (Syrian father)
- Yasin Hamed, footballer (Sudanese father)
- Andrei Bani, footballer (Jordanian father)
- Laura Nureldin, journalist (Sudanese father)
- Christian Sabbagh, journalist (Lebanese father)
- Miryam, singer (Palestinian father)

== See also ==
- Immigration to Romania
- Demographics of Romania
- Immigration to Europe
- Arab diaspora
- Arabs in Europe
- List of countries by immigrant population
- Islam in Romania
- Lebanese diaspora
- Syrian diaspora
- Palestinian diaspora
- Moroccan diaspora
- Iraqi diaspora
- Egyptian diaspora
