= Demographics of Romania =

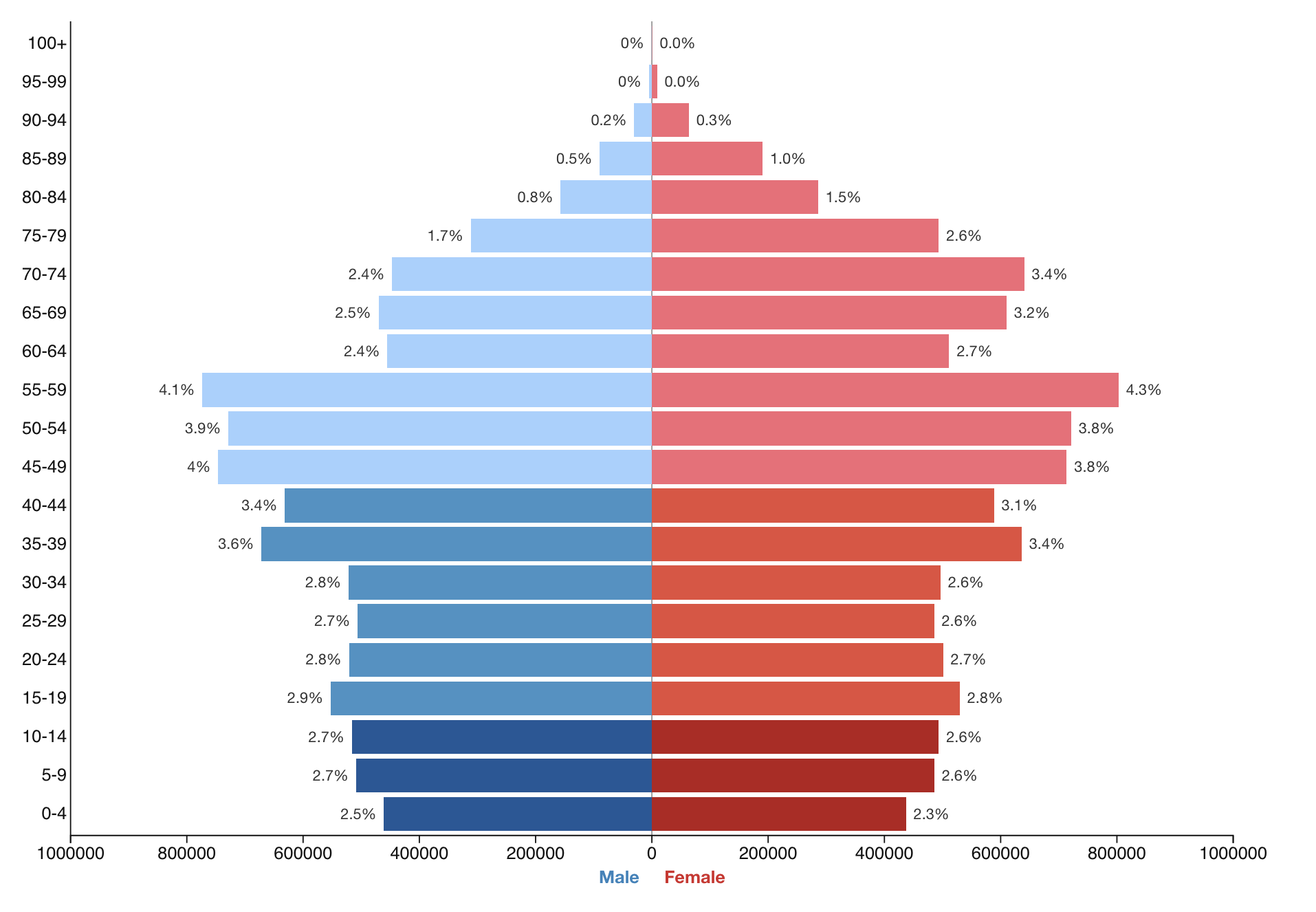
- Population pyramid of Romania as of 2026
- Population: ▲19,051,562 (2023)
- Density: 83.4/km^{2} (216/sq mi)
- Growth rate: ▲1.19% (2023)
- Birth rate: ▼9.292 births/1,000 population (2023)
- Death rate: ▲13.393 deaths/1,000 population (2023)
- Life expectancy: ▲76.6 years (2023)
  - male: ▲72.9 years
  - female: ▲80.5 years
- Fertility rate: 1.71 children born/woman (2022)
- Infant mortality: 5.6 deaths/1,000 live births (2023)
- Net migration rate: −0.24 migrants/1,000 population (2015)
- Immigrant share: 3.4% (2024)

Age structure
- 0–14 years: 3,073,902 (16.1%)
- 15–64 years: 12,253,533 (64.3%)
- 65 and over: 3,726,380 (19.6%)

Sex ratio
- Total: 0.95 males/female (2014)
- At birth: 1.06 males/female
- Under 15: 1.05 males/female
- 15–64 years: 1.02 males/female
- 65 and over: 0.73 males/female

Nationality
- Nationality: noun: Romanian(s), adjective: Romanian
- Major ethnic: ▲ Romanian (89.3%)
- Minor ethnic: ▼ Hungarians (6%); ▲ Romanis (3.4%); ▼ other groups (1.3%)

Language
- Official: Romanian
- Spoken: Romanian and other minority languages

Demographic features of the population of Romania include population density, ethnicity, education level, health of the populace, economic status, religious affiliations, and other aspects of the population.

About 89.3% of the people of Romania are ethnic Romanians (as per 2021 census), whose native language, Romanian, is an Eastern Romance language, descended from Latin (more specifically from Vulgar Latin) with some Slavic, French, Turkish, German, Hungarian, Greek and Italian borrowings.

Romanians are by far the most numerous group of speakers of an Eastern Romance language today. It has been said that they constitute "an island of Latinity" in Eastern Europe, surrounded on all sides either by Slavic peoples (namely South Slavic and East Slavic peoples) or by the Hungarians. The Hungarian minority in Romania constitutes the country's largest minority, or as much as 6.0 per cent of the entire population. With a population of about 19,054,267 people in 2022, Romania received 989,357 Ukrainian refugees on 27 May 2022, according to the United Nations (UN).

The 2022 Russian invasion of Ukraine that began on 24 February 2022 triggered a major refugee crisis in Europe. In connection with the Russian invasion of Ukraine on 24 February 2022, as part of the Russian-Ukrainian war, by 15 May 2022, more than 6,223,821 Ukrainian refugees left the territory of Ukraine, moving to the countries closest to the west of Ukraine, of which more than 188,270 people fled to neighbouring Romania.

== Population evolution ==
Birth and death rates in 1950–2008. A huge surge of the birth rate in 1967 is the most prominent feature of these graphs.

Romania's population has declined steadily in recent decades, from a peak of 23.2 million in 1990 to 19.12 million in 2021. Among the causes of population decline are high mortality, a low fertility rate since 1990, and tremendous levels of emigration.

In 1990, Romania's population was estimated at 23.21 million. Between 1990 and 2006, the estimated population loss exceeded 1.5 million, though the actual figure is likely higher due to the surge in labor migration after 2001 and the tendency of some migrants to settle permanently in their host countries.

Sources give varied estimates for Romania's historical population. The National Institute for Research and Development in Informatics (NIRDI) gives the following numbers (the figure for 2020 was provided by the National Institute of Statistics – INS):

View source data.
View source data.

View source data.
View source data.

== Ethnic groups ==
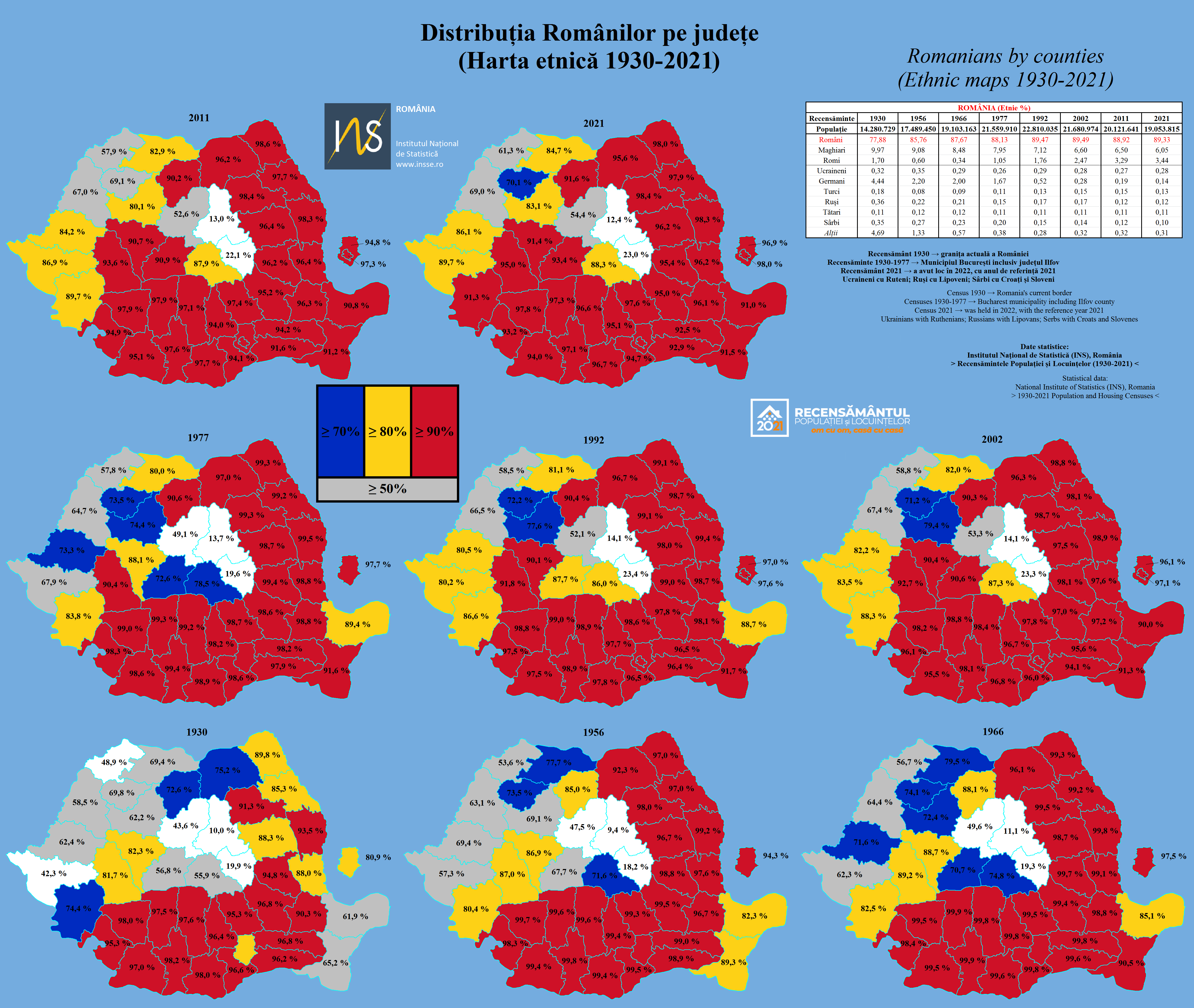
Romanians by counties (Ethnic maps 1930–2021)

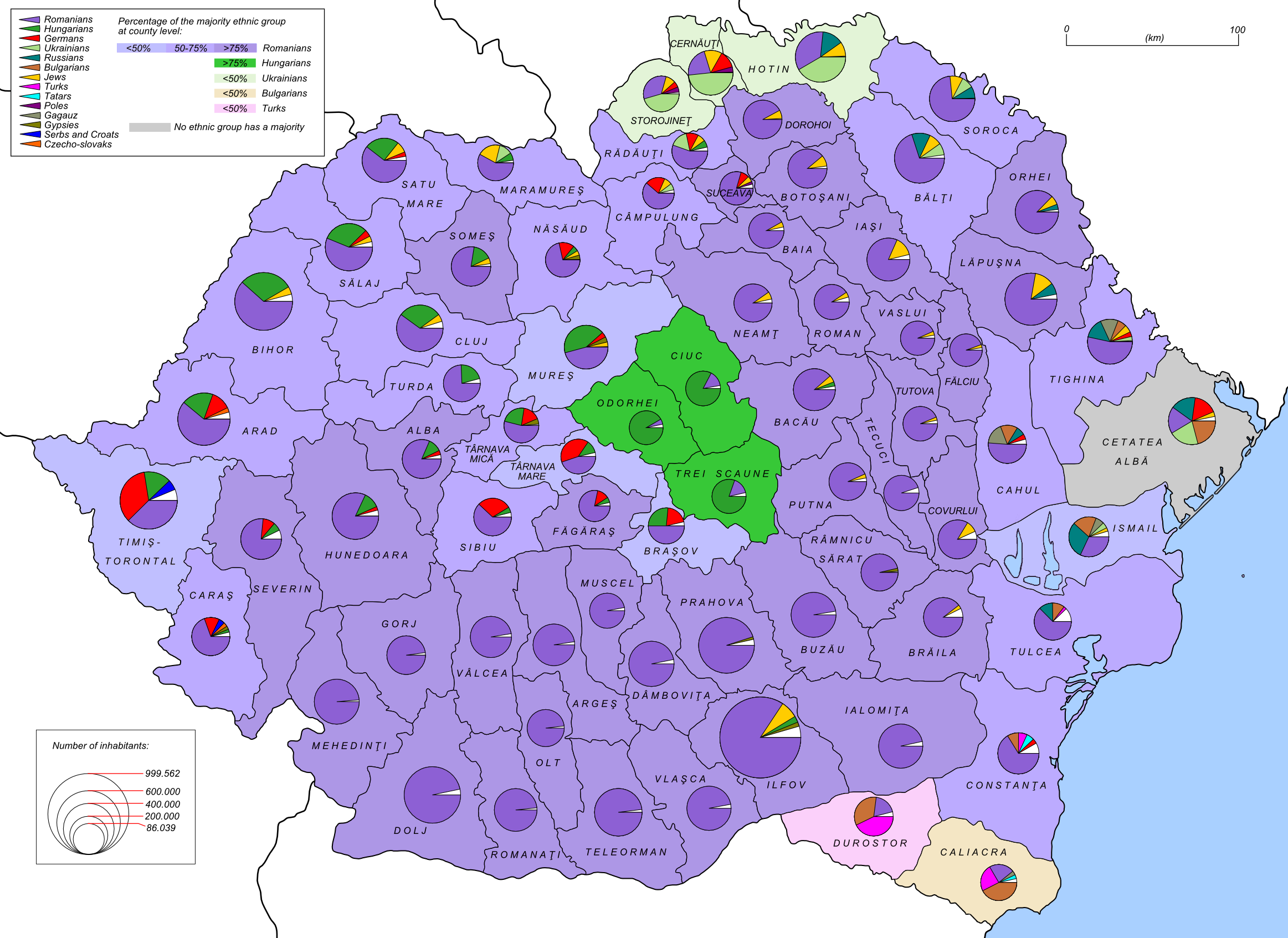
Ethnic map (1930 census)

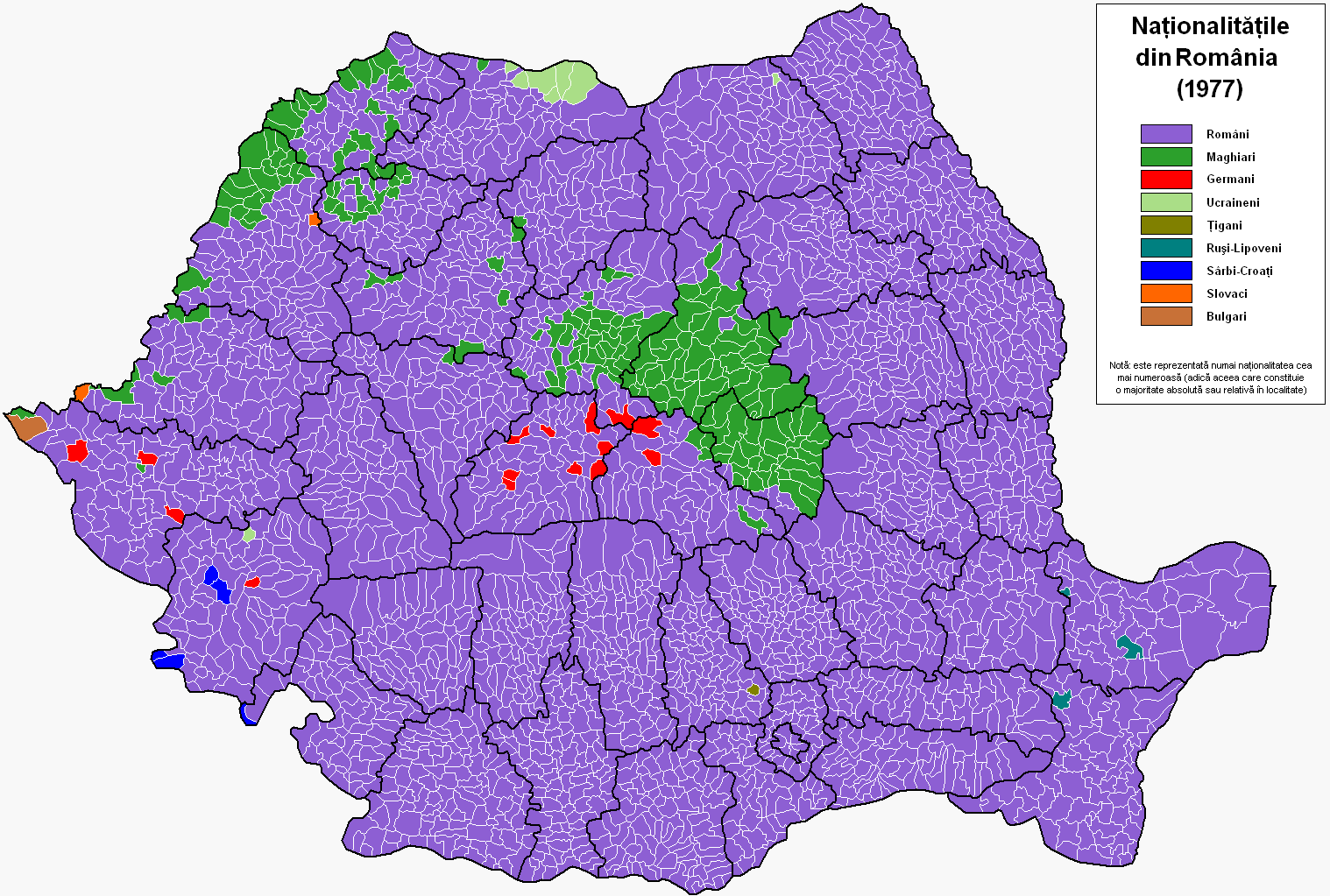
Ethnic map (1977 census)

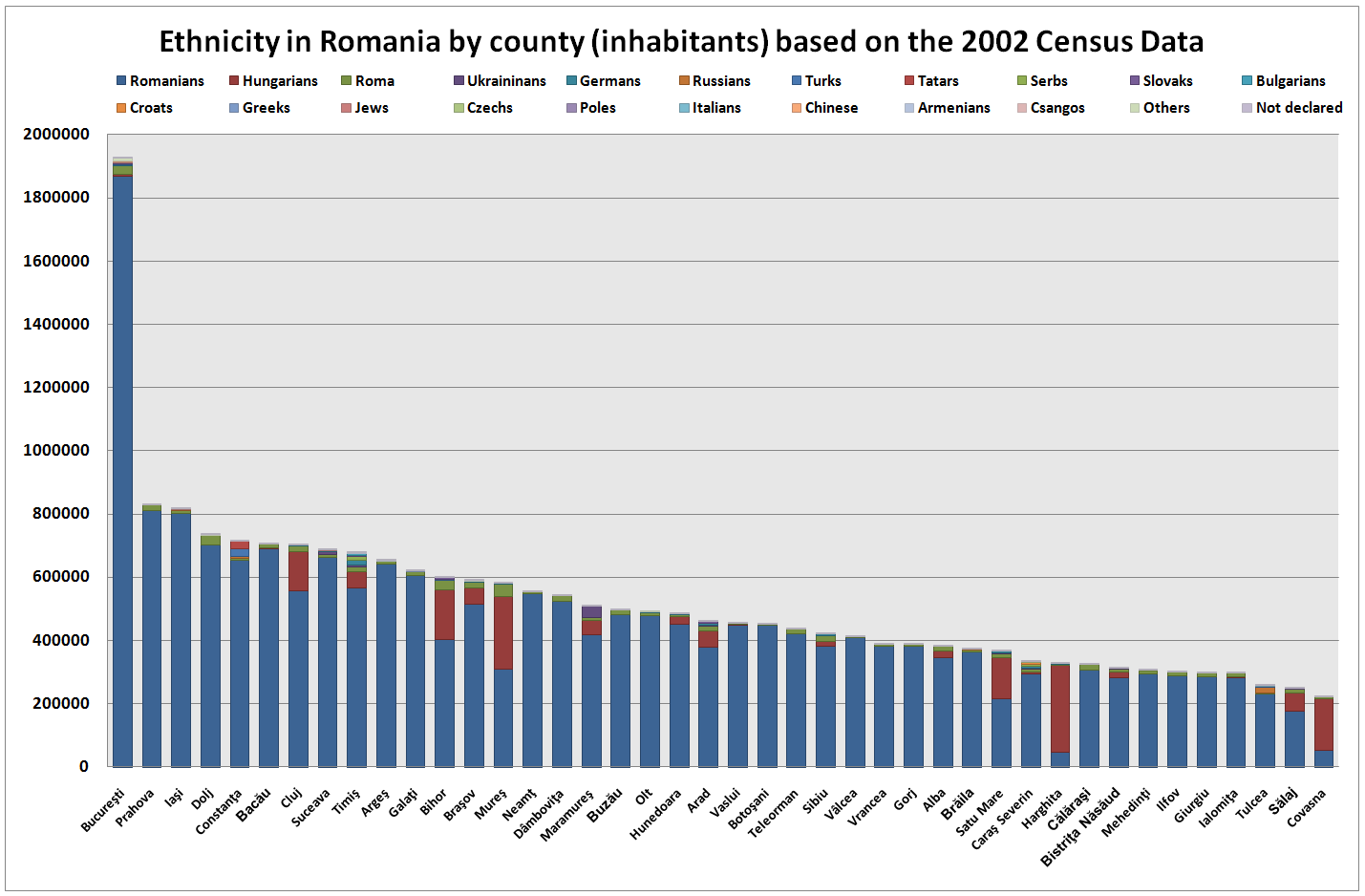
Ethnicity in Romania by county (inhabitants) based on the 2002 census data

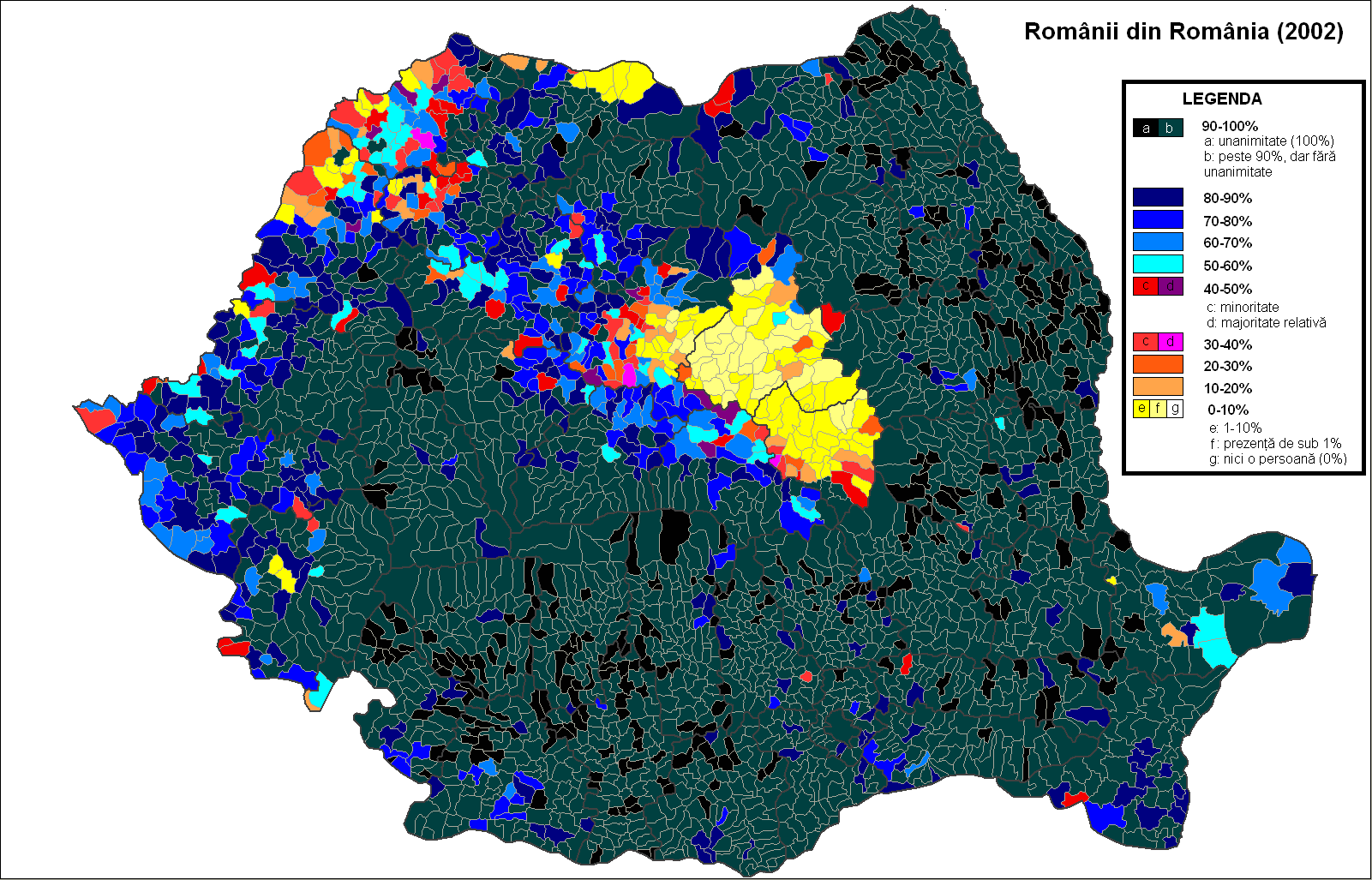
Romanians in Romania based on 2002 census data

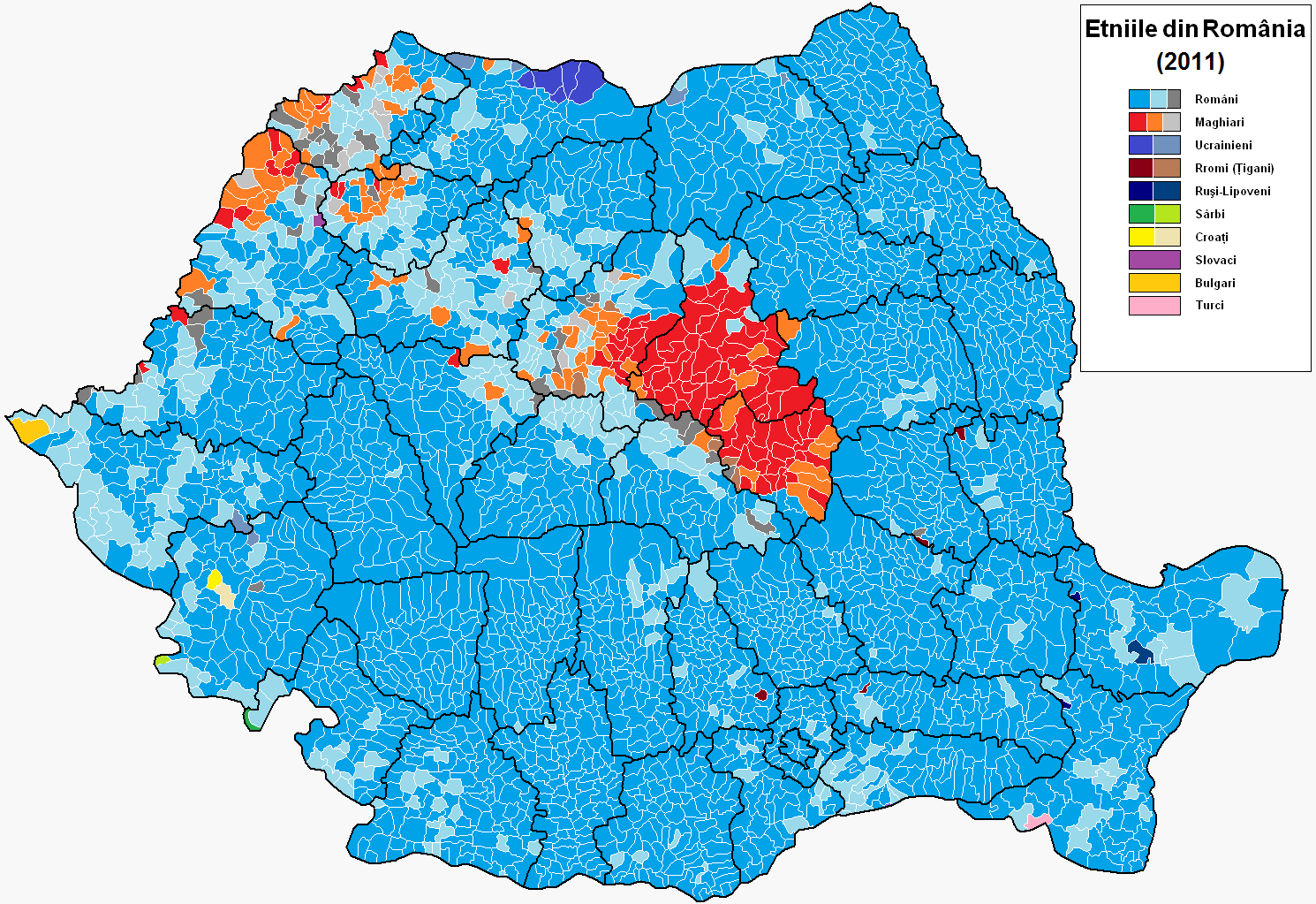
Ethnic map (2011 census)

Slightly more than 10% of the population of Romania is formed of minorities in Romania. The principal minorities are Hungarians and Roma, although other smaller ethnic groups exist too. Before World War II, minorities represented more than 28% of the total population. During the war that percentage was halved, largely by the loss of the border areas of Bessarabia and northern Bukovina (to the former Soviet Union, now Moldova and Ukraine) and southern Dobrudja (to Bulgaria). Two-thirds of the ethnic German population either left or were deported after World War II, a period that was followed by decades of relatively regular (by communist standards) migration. During the interwar period in Romania, the total number of ethnic Germans amounted to as much as 786,000 (according to some sources and estimates dating to 1939), a figure which had subsequently fallen to circa 36,000 as of 2011 in contemporary Romania. One reason for the decline of Romanian Germans is that after the Romanian Revolution there has been a mass migration of Transylvania Saxons to Germany, in what was described by Simon Jenkins in the British daily newspaper The Guardian as "the most astonishing, and little reported, ethnic migration in modern Europe".

Of a total population of three quarters of a million Jews before World War II, about a third were killed during the Holocaust. Mass emigration, mostly to Israel and United States, has reduced the surviving Jewish community to less than 6,000 in 2002 (it is estimated that the real numbers could be 3–4 times higher).

Hungarians (Magyars; especially in Harghita, Covasna, and Mureș counties) and Roma are the principal minorities, with a declining German population (Banat Swabians in Timiș; Transylvanian Saxons in Sibiu, Brașov and elsewhere), and smaller numbers of Czechs, Slovaks, Serbs, Croats, and Banat Bulgarians (in Banat), Ukrainians (especially in Maramureș and Bukovina), Greeks (especially in Brăila and Constanța), Turks and Tatars (mainly in Constanța), Armenians, Russians (Lipovans, Old Believers in Tulcea), Jews and others. Since the Romanian Revolution of 1989, Bucharest and other cities have again become increasingly cosmopolitan, including identifiable presences from outside the EU (Chinese, Turks, Moldovans, Syrians, Iraqis, Africans) as well as from the EU (French, Italians, Germans from Germany, British, Greeks). In Romania, there are also guest workers from countries such as Vietnam and Nepal.

Minority populations are greatest in Transylvania and the Banat, areas in the north and west of the country, which were part of the Kingdom of Hungary (after 1867 Austria-Hungary) until the end of World War I. Even before the union with Romania, ethnic Romanians comprised the overall majority in Transylvania. However, ethnic Hungarians and Germans were the dominant urban population until relatively recently, while Hungarians still constitute the majority in Harghita and Covasna counties.

The Roma constitute one of Romania's largest minorities. According to the 2011 Romanian census, they number 621,573 people or 3.08% of the total population, being the second-largest ethnic minority in Romania after Hungarians, with significant populations in Mureș (8.9%) and Călărași (7,47%) counties. There are different estimates about the size of the total population of people with Roma ancestry in Romania because a lot of people of Roma descent do not declare themselves as Roma. The number of the Roma is usually underestimated in official statistics and may represent 5–11% of Romania's population.

In 2007, the Council of Europe (CoE) estimated that approximately 1.85 million Roma lived in Romania, based on an average between the lowest estimate (1.2 to 2.2 million people) and the highest estimate (1.8 to 2.5 million people) with a maximum percentage of 12%, available at the time; the highest estimate, generated for the year 1991 and originating from a Securitate report, is considered unreliable, and Romanian post-communist censuses have consistently produced far lower figures. The CoE's average estimate is equivalent to 8.32% of the population, a figure difficult to verify due to the mobility of Romani and the reluctance of some to disclose their ethnicity.

After the Hungarians and the Roma, the Ukrainians of Romania are the third-largest minority. According to the 2011 Romanian census they number 51,703 people, making up 0.3% of the total population. Ukrainians mainly live in northern Romania, in areas close to the Ukrainian border. Over 60% of all Romanian Ukrainians live in Maramureș County (where they make up 6.77% of the population).

== Censuses in Romania ==
Evolution of Romania's population, 1859–1899
Year	Population
1859–60	3,864,848−4,424,961
1884	4,648,123
1889	5,038,342
1894	5,406,249
1899	5,956,690

Population of Romania by ethnic group in 1899
Ethnicity	Number	%
Romanians		92.15
Hungarians		1.82
Germans		0.13
Austrians		–
Russians		0.08
Bulgarians		0.13
Turks		0.40
Serbs		0.07
Greeks		0.34
Italians		0.15
Foreigners without protection		4.68
Others		0.00
Unknown		0.00
Total	5,956,690	

Population of Romania by religion in 1899
Orthodoxy	91.5%
Judaism	4.5%
Catholicism	2.5%
Protestantism	0.4%
Muslim	0.7%

Population of Romania by ethnic group in 1912
Ethnicity	Number	%
Romanians		93.47
Hungarians		0.96
Germans		0.11
Austrians		0.63
Russians		0.06
Bulgarians		0.16
Turks		0.47
Serbs		0.06
Greeks		0.24
Italians		0.15
Foreigners without protection		3.63
Others		0.01
Unknown		0.01
Total	7,234,920	

Population of Romania by religion in 1912
Orthodoxy	93.1%
Judaism	3.3%
Catholicism	2.2%
Protestantism	0.3%
Muslim	0.7%

Population of Romania by ethnic group in 1930
Ethnicity	Number	%
Romanians	12,981,324	71.9
Hungarians	1,425,507	7.9
Germans	745,421	4.1
Jews	728,115	4.0
Ruthenians and Ukrainians	582,115	3.2
Russians	409,150	2.3
Bulgarians	366,384	2.0
Roma (Gypsies)	262,501	1.5
Turks	154,772	0.9
Gagauzians	105,750	0.6
Czechs and Slovaks	51,842	0.3
Serbs, Croats and Slovenes	51,062	0.3
Poles	48,310	0.3
Greeks	26,495	0.2
Tatars	22,141	0.1
Armenians	15,544	<0.1
Hutsuls	12,456	<0.1
Albanians	4,670	<0.1
Others	56,355	0.3
Undeclared	7,114	<0.1
Total	18,057,028	100.0

Population of Romania by ethnic group, 1948–2021
Ethnic group	census 1948^{1}		census 1956^{2}		census 1966^{3}		census 1977^{4}		census 1992^{5}		census 2002^{6}		census 2011^{7}			census 2021^{8}		
Ethnic group	Number	%	Number	%	Number	%	Number	%	Number	%	Number	%	Number	%	%^{*}	Number	%	%^{*}
Romanians	13,597,613	85.7	14,996,114	85.7	16,746,510	87.7	18,999,565	88.1	20,408,542	89.5	19,399,597	89.5	16,792,868	83.5	88.9	14,801,442	77.7	89.3
Hungarians	1,499,851	9.4	1,587,675	9.1	1,619,592	8.5	1,713,928	7.9	1,624,959	7.1	1,431,807	6.6	1,227,623	6.1	6.5	1,002,151	5.3	6.0
Roma (Gypsies)	53,425	0.3	104,216	0.6	64,197	0.3	227,398	1.05	401,087	1.8	535,140	2.5	621,573	3.1	3.3	569,477	3.0	3.4
Ukrainians	37,582	0.2	60,479	0.4	54,705	0.3	55,510	0.3	65,764	0.3	61,098	0.3	50,920	0.3	0.3	45,835	0.3	0.3
Germans	343,913	2.2	384,708	2.2	382,595	2.0	359,109	1.6	119,462	0.5	59,764	0.3	36,042	0.2	0.2	22,907	0.1	0.1
Turks	28,782	0.2	14,329	0.2	18,040	0.1	23,422	0.1	29,832	0.1	32,098	0.2	27,698	0.1	0.1	20,945	0.1	0.1
Russians	39,332	0.2	38,731	0.2	39,483	0.2	21,206	0.2	7,983	0.1	35,791	0.2	23,864	0.1	0.1	19,394	0.1	0.1
Lipovans	39,332	0.2	38,731	0.2	39,483	0.2	11,090	0.1	30,623	0.2	35,791	0.2	23,864	0.1	0.1	19,394	0.1	0.1
Tatars							23,369	0.1	24,596	0.1						18,156	0.1	0.1
Serbs	45,447	0.3	46,517	0.3	44,236	0.3	34,429	0.2	29,408	0.1	22,561	0.1	18,076	0.1	0.1	12,026	0.0	0.1
Croats	45,447	0.3	46,517	0.3	44,236	0.3	7,500	0.0	4,085	0.0	6,807	0.0	5,408	0.0	0.0	4,842	0.0	0.0
Slovenes	45,447	0.3	46,517	0.3	44,236	0.3					175	0.0						
Slovaks	35,143	0.2	23,331	0.2	22,151	0.1	21,286	0.1	19,594	0.1	17,226	0.2	13,654	0.1	0.1	10,232	0.0	0.1
Czechs	35,143	0.2	11,821	0.0	9,978	0.0	7,683	0.0	5,797	0.0	3,941	0.0	2,477	0.0	0.0	1,576	0.0	0.0
Bulgarians	13,408	0.1	12,040	0.1	11,193	0.1	10,372	0.0	9,851	0.1	8,025	0.0	7,336	0.0	0.0	5,975	0.0	0.0
Greeks	8,696	0.1	11,166	0.0	9,088	0.0	6,262	0.0	3,940	0.0	6,472	0.0	3,668	0.0	0.0	2,086	0.0	0.0
Jews	138,795	0.9	146,264	0.8	42,888	0.2	24,667	0.1	8,955	0.0	5,785	0.0	3,271	0.0	0.0	2,378	0.0	0.0
Poles	6,753	0.0	7,627	0.0	5,860	0.0	4,641	0.0	4,232	0.0	3,559	0.0	2,543	0.0	0.0	2,137	0.0	0.0
Armenians	6,987	0.0	6,441	0.0	3,436	0.0	2,342	0.0	1,957	0.0	1,780	0.0	1,361	0.0	0.0	1,213	0.0	0.0
Macedonians							1,176	0.0	6,867	0.0	731	0.0	1,264	0.0	0.0	1,089	0.0	0.0
Csangos											1,266	0.0	1,536	0.0	0.0			
Aromanians							982	0.0	21,736	0.1								
Others	15,897	0.1	17,522	0.1	6,990	<0.1	5,731	<0.1	9,368	<0.1	28,303	0.1	23,741	0.1	0.1	25,028	0.2	
Undeclared													1,236,810	6.14		2,484,926	13.0	
Total	15,872,624		17,489,450		19,103,163		21,559,910		22,810,035		21,680,974		20,121,641			19,053,815		
^{1} The results of the 1948 census are according to language. ^{2} Source: ^{3} Source: ^{4} Source: ^{5} Source: ^{6} Source: ^{7} Source: ^{8} Source:%*: of those declared ethnicity

== Vital statistics ==
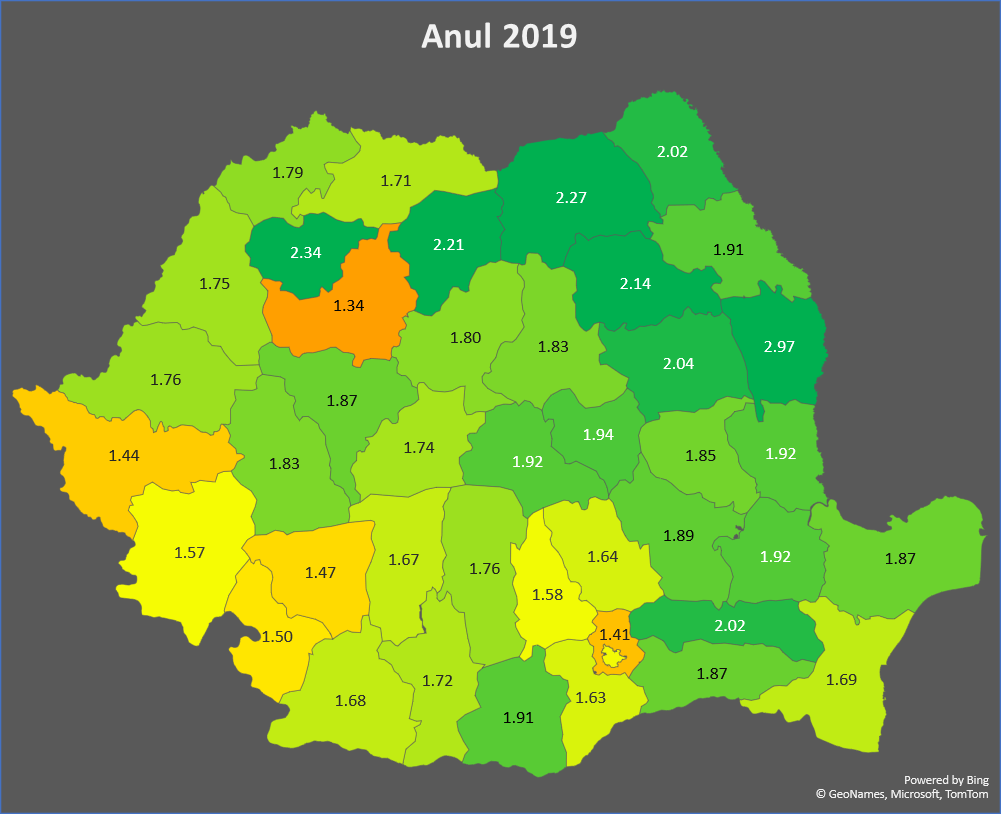
Romania total fertility rate by county (2019)

=== Total fertility rate from 1850 to 1899 ===
The total fertility rate is the number of children born per woman. It is based on fairly good data for the entire period. Sources: Our World In Data and Gapminder Foundation.

Years	1850	1851	1852	1853	1854	1855	1856	1857	1858	1859	1860
Total fertility rate in Romania	5.22	5.08	4.94	4.8	4.66	4.52	4.38	4.24	4.11	3.97	4.23

Years	1861	1862	1863	1864	1865	1866	1867	1868	1869	1870
Total fertility rate in Romania	4.29	4.29	4.07	4.82	4.64	4.19	4.25	4.48	4.56	4.61

Years	1871	1872	1873	1874	1875	1876	1877	1878	1879	1880
Total fertility rate in Romania	4.49	4.29	4.36	4.6	5.2	4.96	4.74	4.22	4.97	5.05

Years	1881	1882	1883	1884	1885	1886	1887	1888	1889	1890
Total fertility rate in Romania	5.56	5.41	5.74	5.55	5.78	5.65	5.49	5.68	5.44	5.16

Years	1891	1892	1893	1894	1895	1896	1897	1898	1899
Total fertility rate in Romania	5.67	5.23	5.43	5.48	5.67	5.45	5.75	4.92	5.63

=== Before World War I ===
Notable events in Romanian demographics:

- 1866, 1873-1874, 1893, 1913 – Major cholera outbreaks
- 1877-1878 – Romanian war of independence

Statistics
Year	Average population (December 31)	Live births	Deaths	Natural change	Crude birth rate (per 1000)	Crude death rate (per 1000)	Natural change (per 1000)	Total fertility rates
1859	3,865,000	114,361	65,293	49,068				
1860	3,917,000	123,997	79,793	44,454				
1861	3,969,000	129,470	85,622	43,895				
1862	4,019,000	128,590	87,524	41,043				
1863	4,044,000	123,086	106,721	17,012				
1864	4,093,000	147,278	106,273	41,005				
1865	4,133,000	143,090	111,939	31,151				
1866	4,116,000	130,857	158,275	−25,263				
1867	4,153,000	135,711	106,530	29,306				
1868	4,198,000	142,510	107,775	37,047				
1869	4,250,000	146,639	105,268	43,485				
1870	4,294,000	147,552	111,963	35,589				
1871	4,333,000	145,010	114,576	30,434				
1872	4,348,000	139,084	132,508	6,576				
1873	4,356,000	141,755	141,982	−227				
1874	4,361,000	149,442	152,246	−2,805				
1875	4,399,000	170,571	140,709	29,862				
1876	4,446,000	164,547	125,857	38,690				
1877	4,480,000	158,790	133,381	25,409				
1878	4,486,000	141,239	143,715	−2,356				
1879	4,530,000	183,497	143,984	35,633				
1880	4,546,000	180,616	170,458	8,014				
1881	4,623,000	201,285	130,774	68,614				
1882	4,688,000	198,809	140,261	56,809				
1883	4,776,000	214,023	129,566	80,232				
1884	4,862,000	211,580	130,594	77,605				
1885	4,960,000	223,077	131,417	89,767				
1886	5,046,000	222,178	141,567	78,081				
1887	5,108,000	219,320	163,311	53,804				
1888	5,178,000	219,658	158,674	60,984				
1889	5,256,000	213,222	142,869	70,353				
1890	5,318,000	204,667	150,786	53,881				
1891	5,392,000	228,283	162,287	65,996				
1892	5,424,000	211,679	187,977	23,702				
1893	5,486,000	222,115	169,132	52,893				
1894	5,545,000	226,605	175,887	50,728				
1895	5,635,000	238,191	155,702	82,489				
1896	5,710,000	232,428	166,142	66,286				
1897	5,795,000	248,845	171,808	77,037				
1898	5,863,000	214,980	155,417	59,563				
1899	5,957,000	250,318	164,900	85,418				
1900	6,045,000	234,843	146,201	88,642	38.8	24.2	14.7	5.20
1901	6,126,000	240,703	160,361	80,342	39.3	26.2	13.2	5.27
1902	6,193,000	241,886	171,828	70,058	39.0	27.7	11.3	5.23
1903	6,289,000	252,246	156,006	96,240	40.1	24.8	15.3	5.37
1904	6,390,000	256,177	155,936	100,241	40.1	24.4	15.6	5.37
1905	6,478,000	247,959	159,932	88,027	38.3	24.7	13.6	5.13
1906	6,583,000	262,803	157,360	105,443	39.9	23.9	16.0	5.35
1907	6,683,000	274,000	176,000	98,000	41.1	26.3	14.8	5.51
1908	6,771,000	273,000	185,000	88,000	40.3	27.4	13	5.40
1909	6,865,000	282,000	188,000	94,000	41.1	27.4	13.7	5.51
1910	6,965,000	274,000	173,000	101,000	39.3	24.8	14.5	5.27
1911	7,086,000	300,000	179,000	121,000	42.3	25.3	17.1	5.67
1912	7,243,000	314,000	166,000	148,000	43.4	22.9	20.4	5.82
1913	7,353,000	310,000	192,000	118,000	42.1	26.1	16.0	5.64
1914	7,771,000	327,000	183,000	144,000	42.1	23.5	18.5	5.64
1915	7,897,000	320,000	194,000	126,000	40.5	24.5	15.9	5.43

Years	1916	1917	1918
Total fertility rate in Romania	4.84	4.25	3.67

=== Interwar period (between World War I and II) ===
	Average population	Live births	Deaths	Natural change	Crude birth rate (per 1000)	Crude death rate (per 1000)	Natural change (per 1000)	Total fertility rates
1919	15,920,000	366,000	328,000	38,000	23.0	20.6	2.4	3.08
1920	16,010,000	539,000	415,000	124,000	33.7	25.9	7.7	4.52
1921	16,240,000	620,000	372,000	248,000	38.2	22.9	15.3	5.12
1922	16,500,000	614,000	376,000	238,000	37.2	22.8	14.4	4.98
1923	16,770,000	609,000	372,000	237,000	36.4	22.1	14.4	4.88
1924	16,990,000	623,000	383,000	240,000	36.7	22.5	14.1	4.92
1925	17,190,000	606,000	362,000	244,000	35.2	21.1	14.1	4.72
1926	17,460,000	608,000	373,000	235,000	34.8	21.4	13.4	4.66
1927	17,690,000	603,000	393,000	210,000	34.1	22.2	11.9	4.57
1928	17,970,000	624,000	352,000	272,000	34.7	19.6	15.1	4.65
1929	17,640,000	601,000	378,000	223,000	34.1	21.4	12.6	4.57
1930	17,870,000	625,000	347,000	278,000	35.0	19.4	15.6	4.69
1931	18,190,000	605,000	379,000	226,000	33.3	20.8	12.4	4.46
1932	18,427,000	662,000	399,000	263,000	35.9	21.7	14.3	4.81
1933	18,653,000	598,000	348,000	250,000	32.1	18.7	13.4	4.30
1934	18,914,000	612,416	390,668	221,748	32.4	20.7	11.7	4.34
1935	19,088,000	585,503	402,720	182,783	30.7	21.1	9.6	4.11
1936	19,319,000	608,906	382,179	226,727	31.5	19.8	11.7	4.22
1937	19,535,000	601,310	377,954	223,356	30.8	19.3	11.4	4.13
1938	19,750,000	585,423	379,445	205,978	29.6	19.2	10.4	3.97
1939	19,934,000	563,817	370,348	193,469	28.3	18.6	9.7	3.79

Years	1940	1941	1942	1943	1944	1945
Total fertility rate in Romania	3.55	3.08	2.87	3.14	2.91	2.63

=== After World War II ===
Main sources:

Source: National Institute of Statistics

Notable events in Romanian demographics:

- 1946–1947: Romanian famine of 1946–1947
- 1967–1989 – Decree 770
- 1989 – Romanian revolution
- 2007 – Romanian accession to the EU
- 2020-2022 – COVID-19 Pandemic

	Average population (July 1)	Live births	Deaths	Natural change	Crude birth rate (per 1000)	Crude death rate (per 1000)	Natural change (per 1000)	Crude migration change (per 1000)	Total fertility rates (Note: In fertility rates, 2.1 and above is a stable population and has been marked blue, 2 and below leads to an aging population and the result is that the population decreases.)
1946	15,760,000	391,273	296,439	94,834	24.8	18.8	6.0		3.32
1947	15,860,000	370,562	349,331	21,231	23.4	22.0	1.3	5.0	3.14
1948	15,893,000	379,868	248,238	131,630	23.9	15.6	8.3	−6.2	3.20
1949	16,084,000	444,065	219,881	224,184	27.6	13.7	13.9	−2.1	3.70
1950	16,311,000	426,820	202,010	224,810	26.2	12.4	13.8	0.1	3.14
1951	16,464,000	412,534	210,021	202,513	25.1	12.8	12.3	−3.0	3.01
1952	16,630,000	413,217	195,287	217,930	24.8	11.7	13.1	−3.2	2.97
1953	16,847,000	401,717	194,752	206,965	23.8	11.6	12.3	0.6	2.76
1954	17,040,000	422,346	195,091	227,255	24.8	11.4	13.3	−2.0	2.98
1955	17,325,000	442,864	167,535	275,329	25.6	9.7	15.9	0.6	3.07
1956	17,583,000	425,704	174,847	250,857	24.2	9.9	14.3	0.4	2.89
1957	17,829,000	407,819	181,923	225,896	22.9	10.2	12.7	1.1	2.73
1958	18,056,000	390,500	156,493	234,007	21.6	8.7	13.0	−0.4	2.58
1959	18,226,000	368,007	186,767	181,240	20.2	10.2	9.9	−0,6	2.43
1960	18,403,414	352,241	160,720	191,521	19.1	8.7	10.4	−0.8	2.33
1961	18,566,932	324,859	161,936	162,923	17.5	8.7	8.8	0	2.17
1962	18,680,721	301,985	172,429	129,556	16.2	9.2	6.9	−0.8	2.04
1963	18,813,131	294,886	155,767	139,119	15.7	8.3	7.4	−0.4	2.01
1964	18,927,081	287,383	152,476	134,907	15.2	8.1	7.1	−1.1	1.96
1965	19,027,367	278,362	163,393	114,969	14.6	8.6	6.0	−0.8	1.91
1966	19,140,783	273,678	157,445	116,233	14.3	8.2	6.1	−0.1	1.90
1967	19,284,814	527,764	179,129	348,635	27.4	9.3	18.1	−10.7	3.66
1968	19,720,984	526,091	188,509	337,582	26.7	9.6	17.1	5.1	3.63
1969	20,010,178	465,764	201,225	264,539	23.3	10.1	13.2	1.3	3.19
1970	20,252,541	427,034	193,255	233,779	21.1	9.5	11.5	0.4	2.89
1971	20,469,658	400,146	194,306	205,840	19.5	9.5	10.1	0.6	2.66
1972	20,662,648	389,153	189,793	199,360	18.8	9.2	9.6	−0.3	2.55
1973	20,827,525	378,696	203,559	175,137	18.2	9.8	8.4	−0.5	2.44
1974	21,028,841	427,732	191,286	236,446	20.3	9.1	11.2	−1.7	2.72
1975	21,245,103	418,185	197,538	220,647	19.7	9.3	10.4	−0.2	2.62
1976	21,445,698	417,353	204,873	212,480	19.5	9.6	9.9	−0.6	2.58
1977	21,657,569	423,958	208,685	215,273	19.6	9.6	9.9	−0.2	2.60
1978	21,854,622	416,598	211,846	204,752	19.1	9.7	9.4	−0.4	2.54
1979	22,048,305	410,603	217,509	193,094	18.6	9.9	8.8	0	2.50
1980	22,201,387	398,904	231,876	167,028	18.0	10.4	7.5	−0.6	2.45
1981	22,352,635	381,101	224,635	156,466	17.0	10.0	7.0	−0.2	2.37
1982	22,477,703	344,369	224,120	120,249	15.3	10.0	5.3	0.2	2.17
1983	22,553,074	321,498	233,892	87,606	14.3	10.4	3.9	−0.5	2.00
1984	22,624,505	350,741	233,699	117,042	15.5	10.3	5.2	−2.0	2.19
1985	22,724,836	358,797	246,670	112,127	15.8	10.9	4.9	−0.5	2.26
1986	22,823,479	376,896	242,330	134,566	16.5	10.6	5.9	−1.6	2.39
1987	22,940,430	383,199	254,286	128,913	16.7	11.1	5.6	−0.5	2.42
1988	23,053,552	380,043	253,370	126,673	16.5	11.0	5.5	−0.6	2.31
1989	23,151,564	369,544	247,306	122,238	16.0	10.7	5.3	−1.1	2.19
1990	23,206,720	314,746	247,086	67,660	13.6	10.6	2.9	−0.5	1.83
1991	23,185,084	275,275	251,760	23,515	11.9	10.9	1.0	−1.9	1.56
1992	22,788,969	260,393	263,855	−3,462	11.4	11.6	−0.2	−16.9	1.50
1993	22,755,260	249,994	263,323	−13,329	11.0	11.6	−0.6	−0.9	1.45
1994	22,730,622	246,736	266,101	–19,365	10.9	11.7	−0.9	−0.2	1.42
1995	22,680,951	236,640	271,672	−35,032	10.4	12.0	−1.5	−0.6	1.34
1996	22,607,620	231,348	286,158	−54,810	10.2	12.7	−2.4	−0.8	1.29
1997	22,545,925	236,891	279,315	−42,424	10.5	12.4	−1.9	−0.9	1.31
1998	22,502,803	237,297	269,166	−31,869	10.5	12.0	−1.4	−0.5	1.33
1999	22,458,022	234,600	265,194	−30,594	10.4	11.8	−1.4	-0.6	1.32
2000	22,435,205	234,521	255,820	−21,299	10.5	11.4	−0.9	−0.1	1.32
2001	22,408,393	220,368	259,603	−39,235	9.8	11.6	−1.8	0.6	1.23
2002	21,675,775	210,529	269,666	−59,137	9.7	12.4	−2.7	−30.1	1.26
2003	21,574,365	212,459	266,575	−54,116	9.8	12.4	−2.5	−2.2	1.29
2004	21,451,845	216,261	258,890	−42,629	10.1	12.1	−2.0	−3.7	1.32
2005	21,319,673	221,020	262,101	−41,081	10.4	12.3	−1.9	−4.2	1.38
2006	21,193,749	219,483	258,094	−38,611	10.4	12.2	−1.8	−4.1	1.41
2007	20,882,980	214,728	251,965	−37,237	10.3	12.1	−1.8	−12.9	1.43
2008	20,537,848	221,900	253,202	−31,302	10.8	12.3	−1.5	−15.0	1.58
2009	20,367,437	222,388	257,213	−34,825	10.9	12.6	−1.7	−6.6	1.65
2010	20,246,798	212,199	259,723	−47,524	10.5	12.8	−2.3	−3.6	1.58
2011	20,147,657	196,242	251,439	−55,197	9.7	12.5	−2.7	−2.2	1.46
2012	20,060,182	201,104	255,539	−54,435	10.0	12.7	−2.7	−1.6	1.52
2013	19,988,694	214,932	250,466	−35,534	10.8	12.5	−1.7	−0.6	1.45
2014	19,916,451	202,501	255,604	−53,103	10.2	12.8	−2.6	−0.8	1.55
2015	19,822,250	206,190	262,981	−56,791	10.4	13.3	−2.9	−1.7	1.61
2016	19,706,424	209,641	258,896	−49,255	10.6	13.1	−2.5	−3.2	1.68
2017	19,592,933	214,928	262,811	−47,883	11.0	13.4	−2.4	−3.1	1.77
2018	19,483,840	214,614	265,494	−50,880	11.0	13.6	−2.6	−2.8	1.81
2019	19,394,228	215,467	261,445	−45,978	11.1	13.5	−2.4	−2.0	1.86
2020	19,296,076	211,273	300,114	−88,841	11.0	15.6	−4.6	−0.3	1.80
2021	19,140,432	203,418	336,678	−133,260	10.6	17.6	−7.0	−1.7	1.81
2022	19,053,345	188,322	273,980	−85,658	9.9	14.4	−4.5	1.1	1.71
2023	19,065,938	164,004	244,624	−80,620	8.6	12.8	−4.2	5.1	1.54
2024	19,059,534	157,270	245,698	−88,428	8.3	12.9	−4.6	4.8	1.39
2025	19,046,434	145,725	239,691	–93,966	7.7	12.6	−4.9	3.5	1.30(e)
2026p	19,041,322*								1.29 (e)

* Data as of January 1, 2026. Data as of July 1 are to be released.

Note:

The 2011 Romanian census gave a figure of 20,121,641.

The 2021 Romanian census gave a figure of 19,053,815.

Live births, deaths, natural increase, and their rates refer to the usual resident population of Romania between 2013 and 2024.

=== Current vital statistics ===
The current vital statistics of Romania are as follows

Period	Live births	Deaths	Natural increase
January—September 2025	109,163	178,307	−69,144
January—September 2026	105,791	177,753	−71,962
Difference	▼ −3,372 (–3.08%)	▼ –554 (–0.31%)	▼ –2,818

View source data.

=== Total fertility rates by region and county ===
2024
Regions	TFR
Centru	1.53
Nord-Est	1.50
Nord-Vest	1.42
Sud-Est	1.41
Romania	1.39
Sud − Muntenia	1.36
Vest	1.33
Sud-Vest	1.26
București - Ilfov	1.19

2023
Regions	TFR
Bihor County	1.67
Bistrița-Năsăud County	1.64
Cluj County	1.34
Maramureș County	1.47
Satu Mare County	1.53
Sălaj County	1.96
Alba County	1.55
Brașov County	1.67
Covasna County	1.63
Hargita County	1.71
Mureș County	1.67
Sibiu County	1.60
Bacău County	1.61
Botoșani County	1.64
Iași County	1.69
Neamț County	1.62
Suceava County	2.08
Vaslui County	1.79
Brăila County	1.44
Buzău County	1.50
Constanța County	1.56
Galați County	1.63
Tulcea County	1.49
Vrancea County	1.55
Argeș County	1.40
Călărași County	1.59
Dâmbovița County	1.38
Giurgiu County	1.52
Ialomița County	1.84
Prahova County	1.45
Teleorman County	1.43
București	1.38
Ilfov County	1.20
Dolj County	1.50
Gorj County	1.23
Mehedinți County	1.25
Olt County	1.44
Vâlcea County	1.26
Arad County	1.57
Caraș-Severin County	1.43
Hunedoara County	1.39
Timiș County	1.38
Romania	1.54

Population estimates by sex and age group (1 January 2021) (provisional estimates)

Age group	Male	Female	Total	%
Total	9,387,590	9,814,072	19,201,662	100
0–4	521,481	493,753	1,015,234	5.29
5–9	491,575	465,014	956,589	4.98
10–14	542,113	513,007	1,055,120	5.49
15–19	529,720	497,225	1,026,945	5.35
20–24	516,683	488,542	1,005,225	5.24
25–29	521,145	486,568	1,007,713	5.25
30–34	692,834	641,537	1,334,371	6.95
35–39	666,920	624,800	1,291,720	6.73
40–44	773,295	740,280	1,513,575	7.88
45–49	757,067	717,118	1,474,185	7.68
50–54	802,907	770,972	1,573,879	8.20
55–59	502,848	511,124	1,013,972	5.28
60–64	574,456	653,682	1,228,138	6.40
65−69	536,795	676,615	1,213,410	6.32
70−74	403,858	556,959	960,817	5.00
75−79	234,736	370,749	605,485	3.15
80−84	181,168	332,869	514,037	2.68
85−89	92,247	181,016	273,263	1.42
90−94	34,236	68,768	103,004	0.54
95−99	9,544	18,845	28,389	0.15
100+	1,962	4,629	6,591	0.03
Age group	Male	Female	Total	Percent
0–14	1,555,169	1,471,774	3,026,943	15.76
15–64	6,337,875	6,131,848	12,469,723	64.94
65+	1,494,546	2,210,450	3,704,996	19.30

=== Life expectancy 1950–2020 ===
Life expectancy in Romania since 1932

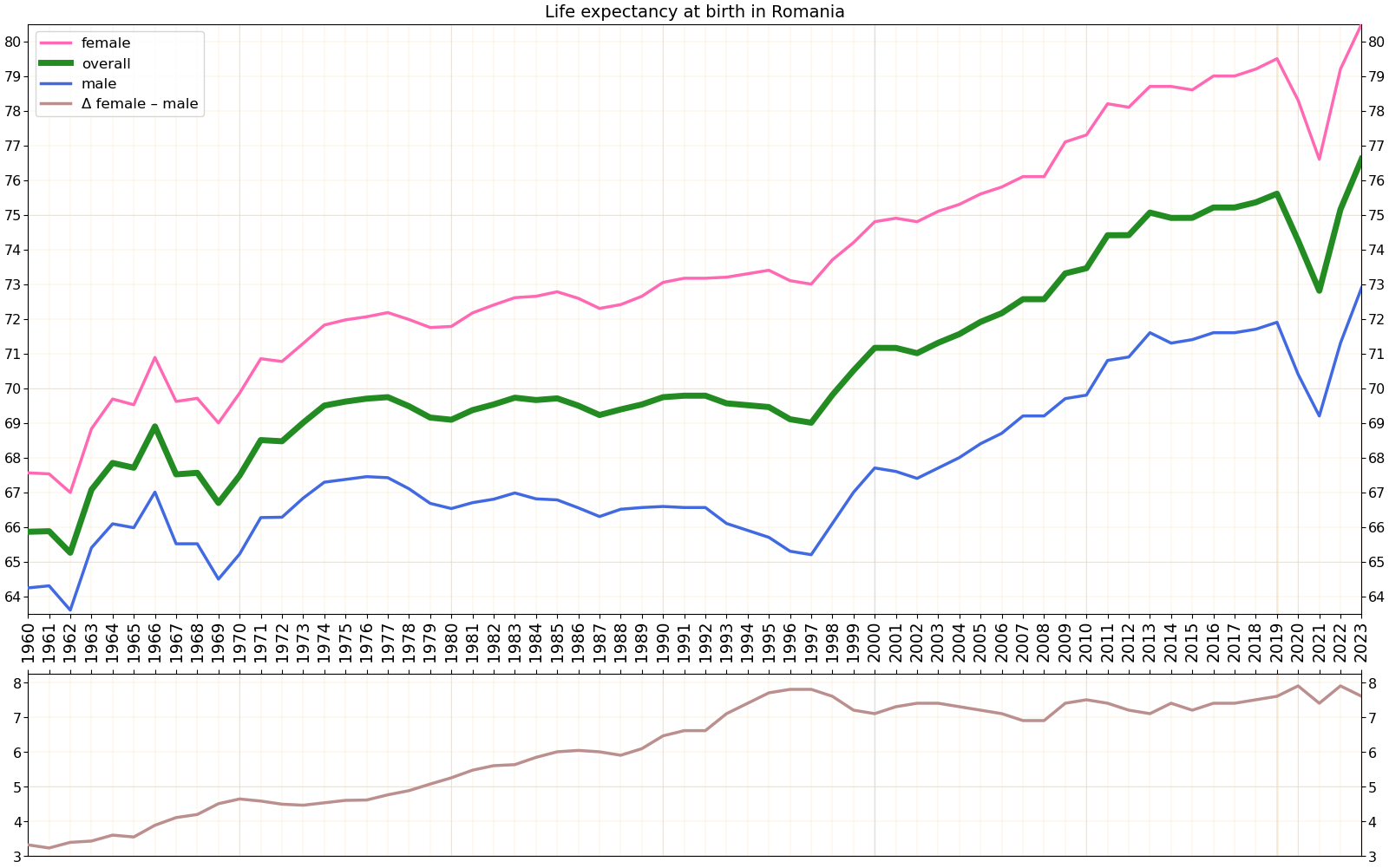
Life expectancy in Romania since 1960 by gender

Average life expectancy at birth of the total population.

Period	Life expectancy in years
1950–1955	61.15
1955–1960	▲63.287
1960–1965	▲67.78
1965–1970	▼67.34
1970–1975	▲69.02
1975–1980	▲69.59
1980–1985	▲69.73
1985–1990	▼69.52
1990–1995	▲69.60
1995–2000	▲69.71
2000–2005	▲71.47
2005–2010	▲73.08
2010–2015	▲74.85
2015–2020	?

== Birth rates by county ==
Romania has 41 counties and one city with a special status, namely Bucharest. Ilfov County has the highest crude birth rate (12.0‰), while Vâlcea County has the lowest crude birth rate (6.6‰). Birth rates are generally higher in rural areas compared to urban areas.

Crude birth rate by county in 2016 (INS)
Județ	Total CBR (‰)	Urban (‰)	Rural (‰)
Romania	8.6	8.3	8.9
Alba County	8.0	7.5	8.8
Arad County	8.5	8.1	8.9
Argeș County	8.3	8.2	8.3
Bacău County	8.0	7.5	8.5
Bihor County	9.2	8.6	9.8
Bistrița-Năsăud County	9.7	9.8	9.7
Botoșani County	8.3	8.1	8.4
Brașov County	9.6	8.6	12.6
Brăila County	6.9	6.2	8.4
Bucharest City	8.8	8.8	—N/a
Buzău County	7.6	7.7	7.6
Caraș-Severin County	6.9	6.7	7.3
Călărași County	8.7	8.5	8.9
Cluj County	9.5	9.2	9.9
Constanța County	9.3	8.8	10.4
Covasna County	9.6	8.1	11.2
Dâmbovița County	8.3	7.7	8.6
Dolj County	7.9	7.9	7.9
Galați County	7.4	6.7	8.3
Giurgiu County	8.3	7.2	8.8
Gorj County	7.5	7.9	7.1
Harghita County	9.4	8.4	10.2
Hunedoara County	7.2	7.4	6.7
Ialomița County	8.2	7.8	8.7
Iași County	9.4	9.1	9.7
Ilfov County	12.0	12.3	11.8
Maramureș County	8.7	8.3	9.2
Mehedinți County	7.8	7.6	8.1
Mureș County	9.4	8.2	10.7
Neamț County	7.5	7.0	7.9
Olt County	7.0	7.8	6.5
Prahova County	7.9	7.6	8.2
Satu Mare County	8.6	7.6	9.5
Sălaj County	10.0	10.2	9.9
Sibiu County	9.3	8.4	11.3
Suceava County	10.3	9.6	10.8
Teleorman County	6.8	6.5	6.9
Timiș County	9.4	9.0	10.0
Tulcea County	7.3	7.8	6.8
Vaslui County	8.2	7.5	8.8
Vâlcea County	6.6	7.2	5.9
Vrancea County	8.3	7.9	8.5

== Demographics statistics ==
Population history of Romania (modern borders)

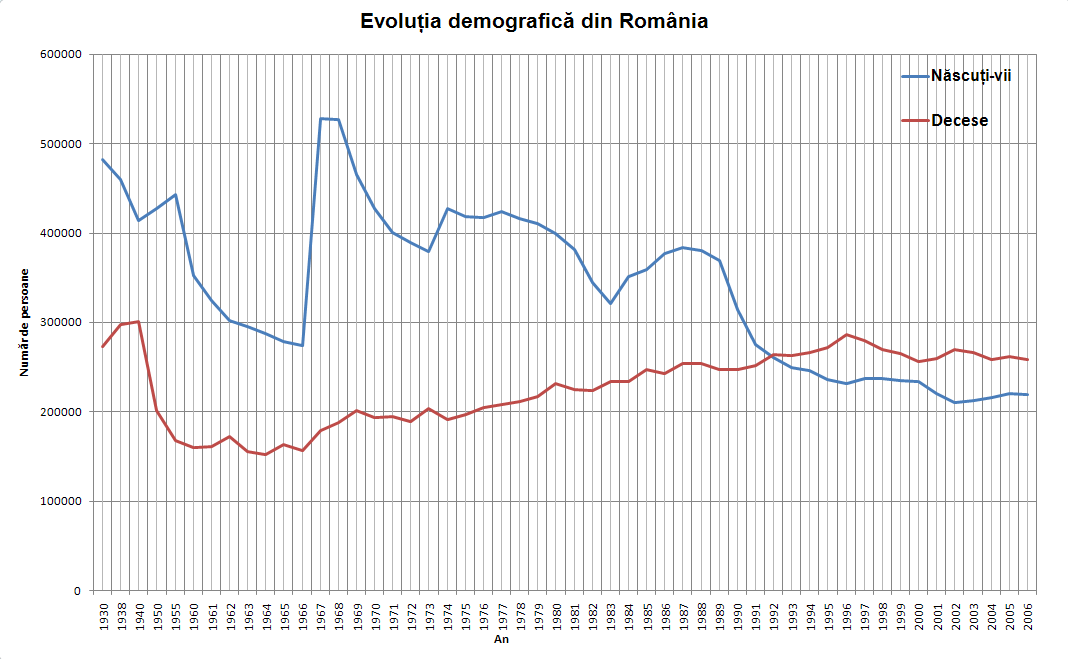
Live births and deaths between 1930 and 2006

Population, fertility rate and net reproduction rate since 1950, United Nations estimates

Demographic statistics according to the World Population Review in 2019.

- One birth every 3 minutes
- One death every 2 minutes
- Net loss of one person every 5 minutes
- One net migrant every 19 minutes

The following demographic statistics are from the CIA World Factbook, unless otherwise indicated.

=== Population ===
c. 19,000,000 (January 2023 est.)

=== Median age ===
total: 42.4 years.
male: 40.6 years
female: 44.1 years (2021 census)

=== Birth rate ===
8.7 births/1,000 population (2018 est.) Country comparison to the world: 211th

=== Death rate ===
12 deaths/1,000 population (2018 est.) Country comparison to the world: 17th

=== Total fertility rate ===
1.71 children born/woman (2017) Country comparison to the world: 154th

=== Net migration rate ===
−0.2 migrant(s)/1,000 population (2018 est.) Country comparison to the world: 113th
−0.13 migrant(s)/1,000 population (2006 est.)

=== Mother's mean age at first birth ===
27.7 years (2024 est.)

=== Population growth rate ===
−0.35% (2018 est.) Country comparison to the world: 219th
−0.127% (2007 estimate).

=== Urban–rural ratio ===
Romania is one of the least urbanised countries in Europe. Just a slight majority, 54.7% lives in urban areas (est. 2023), and the rate of urbanization is −0.15% annual rate of change (2020–25 est.)

=== Sex ratio ===
at birth:
1.06 male(s)/female
under 15 years:
1.05 male(s)/female
15–64 years:
0.99 male(s)/female
65 years and over:
0.71 male(s)/female
total population:
0.95 male(s)/female (2008 est.)

=== Infant mortality rate ===
5.5 deaths/1,000 live births (2024); down from 9.2 deaths/1,000 live births (May 2010); down from 17.3 deaths/1,000 live births in 2002.

=== Life expectancy at birth ===
- total population: 76.25 years (2025 est.) Country comparison to the world: 86th
  - male: 72.74 years (2025 est.)
  - female: 79.82 years (2025 est.)

=== Literacy ===
definition: age 14 and over can read and write (2021 Census)

total population: 99.17%
male: 99.03%
female: 99.29%

=== School life expectancy (primary to tertiary education) ===
total: 14 years
male: 14 years
female: 15 years (2016)

=== Unemployment, youth ages 15–24 ===
total: 20.6%. Country comparison to the world: 62nd
male: 19.9%
female: 21.8% (2016 est.)

=== Nationality ===
The noun form is Romanian(s), and the adjectival form is Romanian.

== Age structure ==
Population pyramid of Romania in 2021

- 0–14 years: 15.4%
- 15–64 years: 62%
- 65 years and over: 22.6% (2024 est.)

As a consequence of the pro-natalist policies of the Nicolae Ceaușescu regime (see Decree 770), Romania has a higher proportion of its population born in the late 1960s and 1970s than any other Western country except Slovenia. The generations born in 1967 and 1968 were the largest, although fertility remained relatively high until 1990. 8.55% of the Romanian population was born in the period from 1976 to 1980, compared with 6.82% of Americans and 6.33% of Britons.

View source data.

=== Age structure by ethnicity ===
Population by ethnicity based on age groups, according to the 2011 census:

Age group	Total population	Romanians	Hungarians	Roma	Ukrainians	Germans	Turks	Others/Undeclared
0–4	1,045,029	766,078	52,158	73,860	2,606	890	2,348	147,089
5–9	1,054,391	804,721	55,477	69,998	3,058	990	2,095	118,052
10–14	1,090,226	861,915	58,081	64,776	3,285	1,072	1,996	99,101
15–19	1,108,453	911,478	59,737	53,768	3,712	1,158	1,651	76,949
20–24	1,366,374	1,119,417	76,714	60,542	3,770	1,488	2,261	102,182
25–29	1,303,077	1,048,482	74,135	49,452	3,545	1,459	2,117	123,887
30–34	1,522,719	1,241,284	90,620	51,267	3,692	1,770	2,452	131,634
35–39	1,538,897	1,283,084	95,034	45,551	3,710	1,999	2,403	107,116
40–44	1,743,878	1,493,176	103,663	39,351	3,530	2,672	2,319	99,167
45–49	1,076,258	924,664	66,469	24,319	3,082	1,933	1,642	54,149
50–54	1,332,266	1,156,851	80,134	25,816	3,259	2,530	1,732	61,944
55–59	1,448,043	1,255,293	94,852	23,064	3,109	3,375	1,554	66,796
60–64	1,244,286	1,084,578	82,353	15,976	2,874	2,523	1,090	54,892
65–69	890,340	766,197	74,709	8,708	2,238	2,796	682	35,010
70–74	901,370	792,445	63,963	7,063	2,190	3,525	560	31,624
75–79	729,965	646,048	48,315	4,803	1,697	2,734	430	25,938
80–84	462,807	407,295	32,265	2,346	1,021	1,947	231	17,702
85+	263,262	229,862	18,944	913	542	1,181	135	11,685

== Immigration ==
Foreign-born population (according to Eurostat):

	2016	2018	2020
Population total	19,760,585	19,533,481	19,328,838
Total	347,344	510,526	723,913
Moldova	137,406	201,628	302,001
(European Union) Italy	46,172	60,543	72,473
(European Union) Spain	35,857	46,645	59,978
Ukraine	14,328	25,644	47,614
United Kingdom	10,428	22,127	34,812
(European Union) Germany	10,750	20,739	34,071
(European Union) France	9,262	15,887	21,960
(European Union) Bulgaria	10,882	10,540	10,029
(European Union) Hungary	7,151	8,588	9,560
Russia	5,596	7,294	9,308
Turkey	6,769	7,933	9,230
(European Union) Greece	5,576	6,843	7,829
China	4,235	5,485	6,125
United States	3,634	5,095	5,771
(European Union) Belgium	1,808	3,120	4,970
Israel	2,121	3,727	4,718
Vietnam	111	642	4,223
(European Union) Ireland	1,299	2,678	3,829
(European Union) Austria	1,179	2,054	3,767
Syria	2,833	3,376	3,191
Serbia	1,897	2,484	2,845
(European Union) Portugal	929	1,771	2,369
(European Union) Denmark	545	1,105	2,246
Sri Lanka	89	340	2,195
Nepal	18	180	2,136
(European Union) Netherlands	552	1,220	1,921
Tunisia	1,362	1,652	1,672
India	235	421	1,572
(European Union) Cyprus	560	1,012	1,508
Iraq	1,701	2,044	1,419
Iran	1,348	1,350	1,410
Norway	477	941	1,375
(European Union) Sweden	408	898	1,356
Morocco	386	876	1,343
Philippines	169	467	1,206
Switzerland	361	789	1,136
(European Union) Poland	387	970	1,061
Pakistan	404	437	1,032

=== Net migration data ===
Romania net migration
Year	Immigration (Permanent)	Emigration (Permanent)	Net migration (permanent)	Temporary immigration	Temporary emigration	Net temporary migration	Total net migration
1991	1,602	44,160	−42,558	–	–	–	−42,558
1992	1,753	31,152	−29,399	–	–	–	−29,399
1993	1,269	18,446	−17,177	–	–	–	−17,177
1994	878	17,146	−16,268	–	–	–	−16,268
1995	4,458	25,675	−21,217	–	–	–	−21,217
1996	2,053	21,526	−19,473	–	–	–	−19,473
1997	6,600	19,945	−13,345	–	–	–	−13,345
1998	11,907	17,536	−5,629	–	–	–	−5,629
1999	10,078	12,594	−2,516	–	–	–	−2,516
2000	11,024	14,753	−3,729	–	–	–	−3,729
2001	10,350	9,921	429	–	–	–	429
2002	6,582	8,154	−1,572	–	–	–	−1,572
2003	3,267	10,673	−7,406	91,726	143,977	−52,251	−59,657
2004	2,987	13,082	−10,095	98,329	194,488	−96,159	−106,254
2005	3,704	10,938	−7,234	91,040	175,297	−84,257	−91,491
2006	7,714	14,197	−6,483	100,537	188,439	−87,902	−94,385
2007	9,575	8,830	745	86,267	544,074	−457,807	−457,062
2008	10,030	8,739	1,291	138,929	302,796	−163,867	−162,576
2009	8,606	10,211	−1,605	135,844	246,626	−110,782	−112,387
2010	7,059	7,906	−847	149,885	197,985	−48,100	−48,947
2011	15,538	18,307	−2,769	147,685	195,551	−47,866	−50,635
2012	21,684	18,001	3,683	167,266	170,186	−2,920	763
2013	23,897	19,056	4,841	153,646	161,755	−8,109	−3,268
2014	36,644	11,251	25,393	136,035	172,871	−36,836	−11,443
2015	23,093	15,235	7,858	132,795	194,718	−61,923	−54,065
2016	27,863	22,807	5,056	137,455	207,578	−70,123	−65,067
2017	50,199	23,156	27,043	177,435	242,193	−64,758	−37,715
2018	65,678	27,229	38,449	172,578	231,661	−59,083	−20,634
2019	64,479	26,775	37,704	202,422	233,736	−31,314	6,390
2020	32,250	21,031	11,219	145,519	186,818	−41,299	−30,080
2021	49,769	34,341	15,428	194,642	216,861	−22,219	−6,791
2022	54,839	48,438	6,401	293,024	202,311	90,713	97,114
2023	29,830	48,612	−18,782	324,091	239,244	84,847	66,065
2024	28,431	51,062	–22,631	288,011	229,180	58,831	36,200
2025	19,637	54,966	–35,329	307,592	205,343	102,249	66,920

== Religion ==
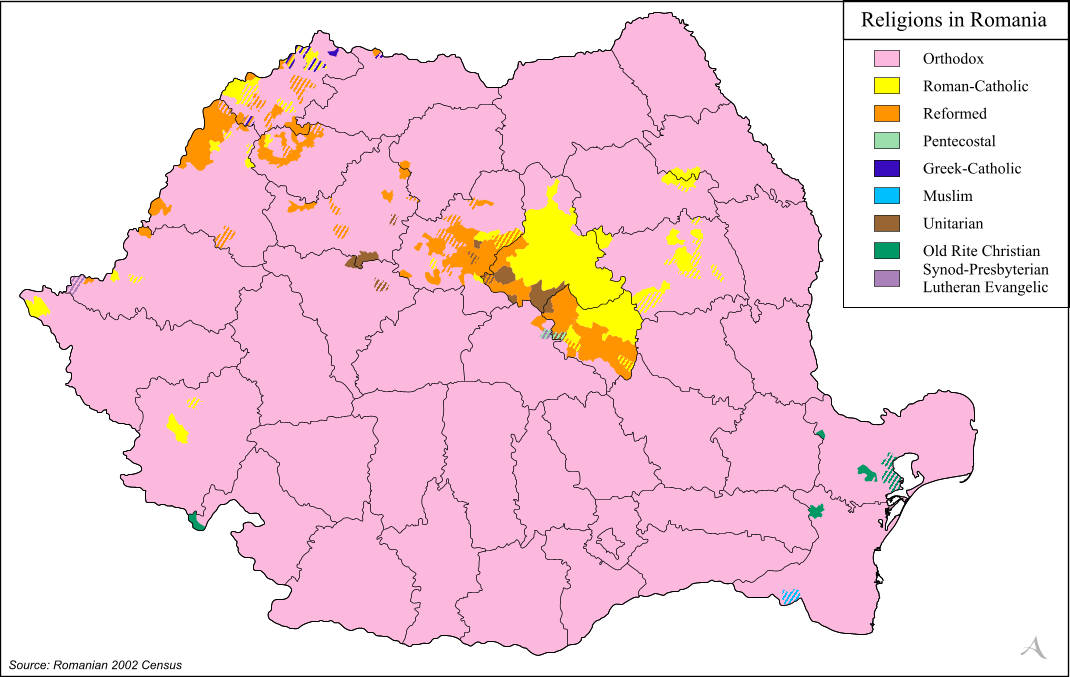
Distribution of religions in Romania

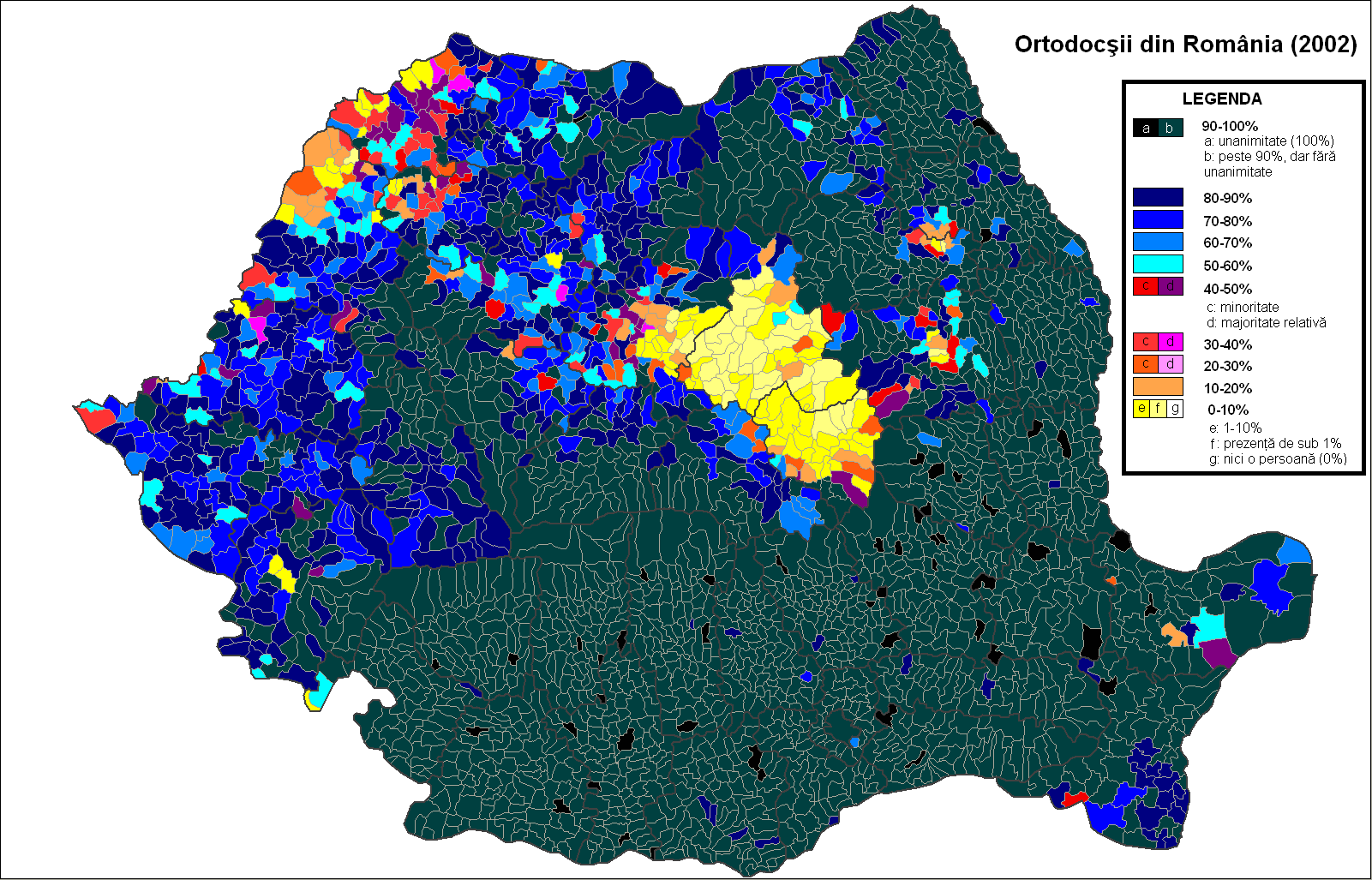
Distribution of Orthodox in Romania

- Romanian Orthodox — 86.7%
- Roman Catholic — 4.7%
- Protestant Churches (Calvin, Lutheran, Unitarian, Pentecostal, Baptist, Adventist) — 5.3%
- Greek Catholic – Uniate — 0.9%
- Islam — 0.3%
- Atheist — ≈0.04% (9,271 people)
- No religion — 0.1%
- Other religions — 2.0%
- Refused to declare — 0.1%

Religious affiliation tends to follow ethnic lines, with most ethnic Romanians identifying with the Romanian Orthodox Church. The Greek Catholic or Uniate church, reunified with the Orthodox Church by fiat in 1948, was restored after the 1989 revolution. The 2002 census indicated that 0.9% of the population was Greek Catholic, as opposed to about 10% prior to 1948. Roman Catholics, largely ethnic Hungarians and Germans, constitute 4.7% of the population; Calvinists, Baptists (see Baptist Union of Romania and Convention of the Hungarian Baptist Churches of Romania), Pentecostals, and Lutherans made up another 5%. There were smaller numbers of Unitarians, Muslims, and other religions.

== See also ==
- Ageing of Europe
- Population exchange between Bulgaria and Romania
- Immigration to Romania
