= Bangladeshis in Romania =

Romanian Bangladesh

Bangladeshi Romanians
রোমানীয় বাংলাদেশী

Total population
- 1,674 (2022)

Regions with significant populations
- Bucharest and other large urban areas

Languages
- Romanian · Bangladeshi English · Bengali

Religion
- Sunni Islam (majority)

Related ethnic groups
- Romanian immigrants · Bangladeshi diaspora

The Bangladesh Romanians (Bengali: রোমানীয় বাংলাদেশী) are a migrant community of Bangladeshis who reside in Romania, and the term can also include their locally born descendants.

== History ==
Bangladeshis come to Romania mostly as skilled workers. Their exact number is unknown. As of 2008, there were hundreds of Bangladeshis living in Romania. However, because Romania's workforce has decreased due to emigration, their numbers have increased since then and they are expected to increase in the future.

== See also ==
- Bangladesh–Romania relations
- Bangladeshi diaspora
- Immigration to Romania
