= Minorities in Romania =

About 9.3% of Romania's population is represented by minorities (the rest of 77.7% being Romanians), and 13% unknown or undisclosed according to 2021 census. The principal minorities in Romania are Romani people, and Hungarians (Szeklers, Csangos, and Magyars; especially in Harghita, Covasna, and Mureș counties), with a declining German population (in Timiș, Sibiu, Brașov, or Suceava) and smaller numbers of Poles in southern Bukovina or Suceava County (Austria-Hungary attracted Polish miners there in the past, who settled in present-day Suceava County from the Kraków region in contemporary Poland during the 19th century), Serbs, Croats, Slovaks and Banat Bulgarians (in Banat), Ukrainians (in Maramureș and Bukovina), Greeks (Brăila, Constanța), Jews (Wallachia, Bucharest), Turks and Tatars (in Constanța), Armenians, Russians (Lipovans, in Tulcea), Afro-Romanians, and others.

To this day, minority populations are greatest in Transylvania and the Banat (and, to a lesser extent, southern Bukovina or Suceava County), historical regions situated in the north and west of the country which were former territorial possessions of either the Kingdom of Hungary, the Habsburgs, or the Austrian Empire (since 1867 the dual monarchy of Austria-Hungary until World War I).

Before World War II, minorities represented more than 28% of the total population. During the war that percentage was halved, largely by the loss of the border areas of Bessarabia and northern Bukovina (to the former Soviet Union, now Republic of Moldova and Ukraine), Black Sea islands (to the former Soviet Union, now Ukraine), and southern Dobrudja (to Bulgaria), as well as by the postwar flight or deportation of ethnic Germans.

In the Romanian election law, government-recognized ethnic minorities in Romania are subject to a significantly lower threshold and have consequently won seats in the Chamber of Deputies since the fall of the Nicolae Ceaușescu communist regime.

== Overview ==
In the table below are enlisted all minority ethnic groups from Romania with more than 1,000 persons (based on the 2002, 2011, and 2021 Romanian censuses):

Minority	Population (2002)	Percentage of the total population (2002)	Population (2011)	Percentage of the total population (2011)	Population (2021)	Percentage of the total population (2021)	County
Hungarians (incl. Szeklers and Csangos)	1,431,807	6.60%	1,227,623 ▼	6.10% ▼	1,002,151 ▼	5.25% ▼	Mainly Transylvania, but also Bucharest
Roma	535,140	2.46%	621,573 ▲	3.08% ▲	569,477 ▲	3.44% ▲	Mureș, Călărași
Ukrainians (incl. Hutsuls and Rusyns)	61,091	0.28%	50,920 ▼	0.25% ▼	45,835 ▼	0.24% ▼	Maramureș, Timiș, Suceava
Germans	59,764	0.28%	36,042 ▼	0.17% ▼	22,907 ▼	0.12% ▼	Timiș, Sibiu, Satu Mare, Caraș-Severin, Brașov, Mureș, Maramureș, Hunedoara, Alba, Bihor, Suceava, Bistrița-Năsăud, Transylvania
Turks	32,098	0.15%	27,698 ▼	0.13% ▼	20,945 ▼	0.11% ▼	Constanța
Russians (incl. Lipovans)	35,791	0.17%	23,487 ▼	0.11% ▼	19,394 ▼	0.10% ▼	Tulcea, Constanța, Iași, Suceava
Crimean Tatars	23,935	0.11%	20,282 ▼	0.10% ▼	18,156 ▼	0.10%	Constanța
Serbs	22,518	0.10%	18,076 ▼	0.08% ▼	12,026 ▼	0.06% ▼	Timiș, Arad, Caraș-Severin, Mehedinți
Slovaks	17,199	0.08%	13,654 ▼	0.06% ▼	12,026 ▼	0.06%	Sălaj, Arad, Bihor, Suceava
Bulgarians	8,025	0.04%	7,336 ▼	0.04%	5,975 ▼	0.03% ▼	Timiș
Croats (incl. Krašovani)	6,786	0.03%	5,408 ▼	0.03%	4,842 ▼	0.025% ▼	Caraș-Severin
Italians	3,288	0.02%	3,203 ▼	0.02%	4,039 ▲	0.02%	Bucharest, Constanța, Timiș
Jews	5,785	0.03%	3,271 ▼	0.02% ▼	2,378 ▼	0.01% ▼	Bucharest
Poles	3,559	0.02%	2,543 ▼	0.01% ▼	2,137 ▼	0.01%	Suceava, Bucharest
Greeks	6,472	0.03%	3,668 ▼	0.02% ▼	2,086 ▼	0.01% ▼	Constanța, Brăila, Transylvania
Czechs	3,938	0.02%	2,477 ▼	0.01% ▼	1,576 ▼	0.008% ▼	Caraș-Severin, Mehedinți, Suceava
Armenians	1,780	0.01%	1,361 ▼	>0.01% ▼	1,213 ▼	>0.01% ▼	Cluj (city of Gherla)
Chinese	2,243	0.01%	2,017 ▼	0.01%			Bucharest
Csángós	1,266	0.01%	1,536 ▲	>0.01% ▲			Bacău
Other lesser minorities and/or recent immigrants:	13,653	0.06%	18,524 ▲	0.10% ▲	19,510 ▲	0.10%	All counties of Romania
Total:	2,276,138	10.49%	2,091,963▼	10.39% ▼	1,767,447▼	9.28% ▼	Romania

== Roma minority in Romania ==
According to the 2021 census, the number of Romani people in Romania was 569,477 people, constituting 3.4% of the total population. The real size of their total population is considered to be higher, with some estimates varying from 4.6% to over 10% of the population, as many Romani do not declare themselves as such. Less than half are native speakers of the Romani language.

In 2007, the Council of Europe (CoE) estimated that approximately 1.85 million Roma lived in Romania, based on an average between the lowest estimate (1.2 to 2.2 million people) and the highest estimate (1.8 to 2.5 million people) with a maximum percentage of 12%, available at the time; the highest estimate, generated for the year 1991 and originating from a Securitate report, is considered unreliable, and Romanian post-communist censuses have consistently produced far lower figures. The CoE's average estimate is equivalent to 8.32% of the population, a figure difficult to verify due to the mobility of Romani and the reluctance of some to disclose their ethnicity.

== Hungarian minority in Romania ==
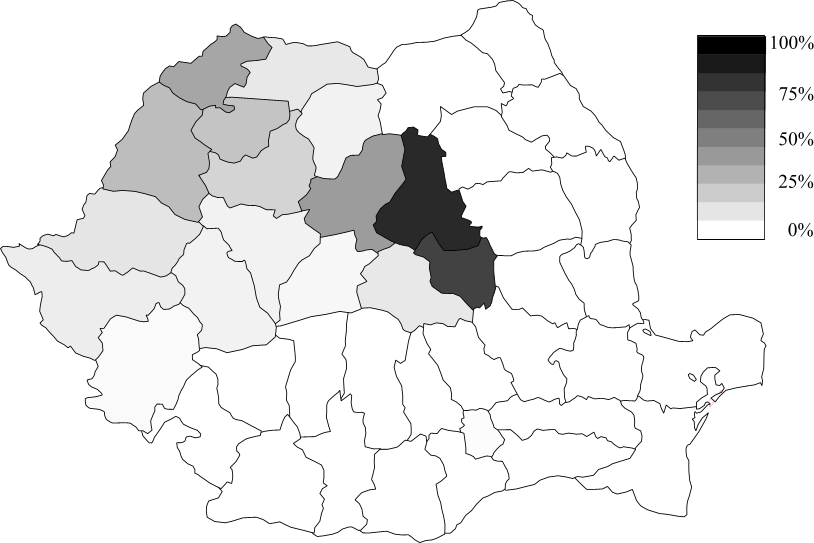
Map of Romanian counties with the Hungarian population highlighted.

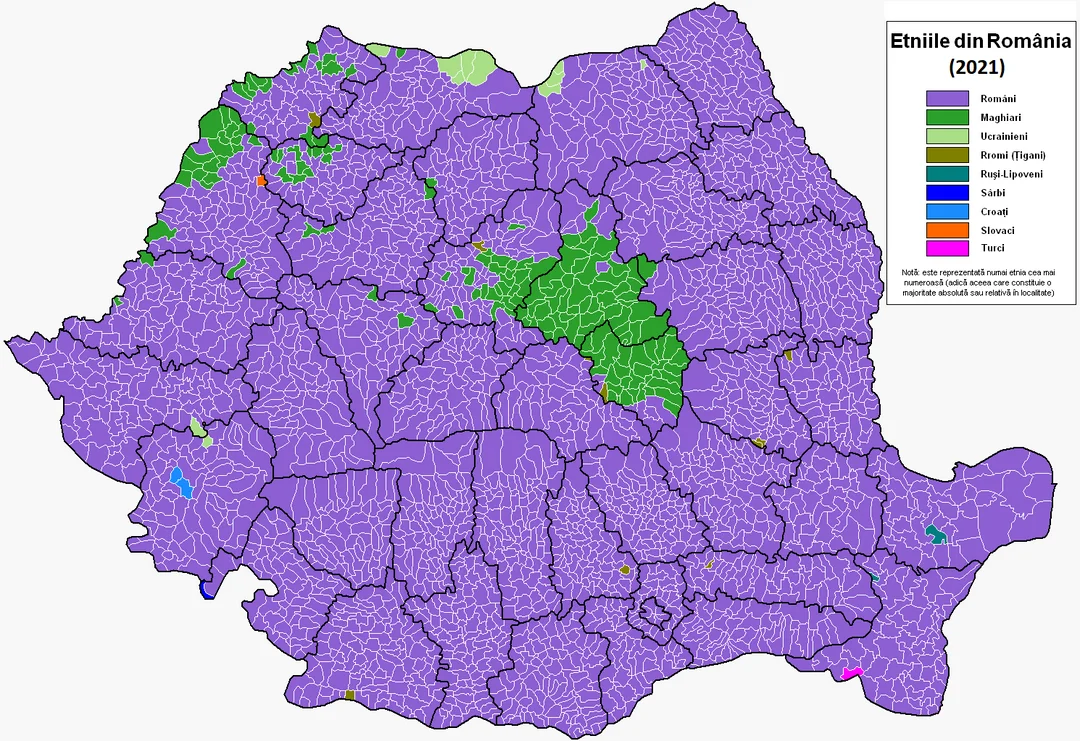
Ethnic map of Romania in 2021

The Hungarian minority in Romania consists of 6.1% of the total population (1,227,623 citizens as per the 2011 census), being thus the largest ethnic minority of the country.

Most ethnic Hungarians live in what is today known as Transylvania (where they make up about 16.79% of the population), an area that includes the historic regions of Banat, Crișana, and Maramureș. They form a large majority of the population only in Harghita and Covasna counties and a large percentage in the Mureș County. There are also Székelys in Bukovina which form a very small minority in Suceava County.

== Greek community ==
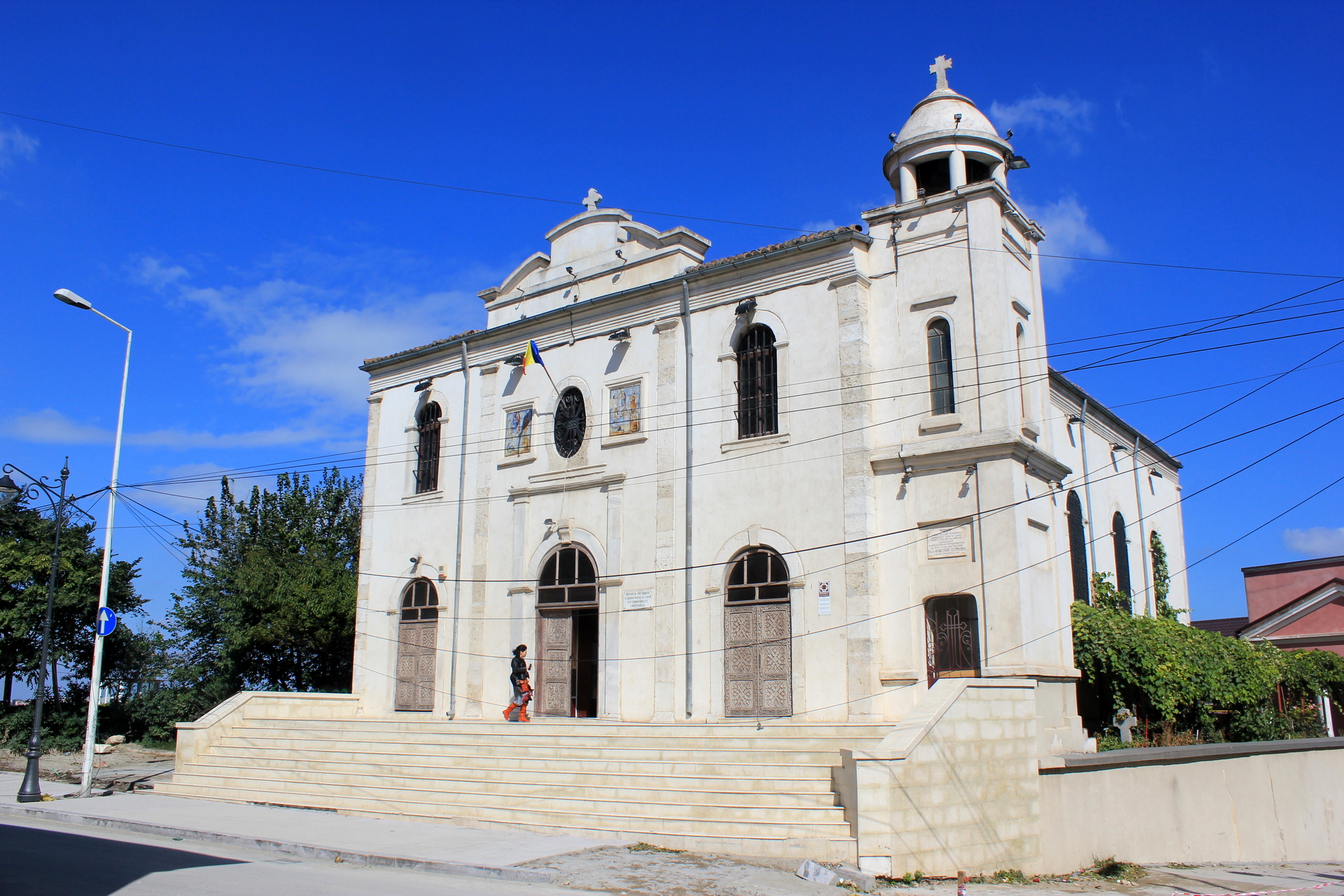
Eastern Orthodox Church Metamorphosis in Constanța, with service occasionally held in Greek

Among the towns and communes in Romania with the highest proportions of Greeks as of 2011 are Izvoarele (Greek: Ιζβοάρελε; 43.82%) and Sulina (Greek: Σουλινάς; 1.69%), both in Tulcea County.

According to the Romanian census of 2002, the Greek community numbered 6,472 persons, most of whom live in Bucharest and its surrounding area. Next in line come the Dobruja counties of Tulcea and Constanța, and the Danube-facing ones of Brăila and Galați. The 1992 census however found 19,594 Greeks; this shows the tendency of assimilation. According to the General Secretariat for Greeks Abroad (a dependency of the Greek Ministry of Foreign Affairs) the Greek community in Romania numbers 14,000.

The Hellenic Union of Romania, founded in 1990, represents the political and cultural preservation interests of the community, notably by providing its representatives in the Chamber of Deputies.

== See also ==
- Afro-Romanians
- Albanians of Romania
- Arabs in Romania
- Armenians in Romania
- Aromanians in Romania
- Banat Bulgarians
- Bulgarians in Romania
- Chinese in Romania
- Crimean Tatars in Romania
- Croats of Romania
- Danube Swabians
- Germans of Romania
- Islam in Romania
- Italians of Romania
- Jews in Romania
- Krashovani (Croats)
- Lipovans
- Macedonians in Romania
- Megleno-Romanians
- Poles in Romania
- Romani people in Romania
- Romanian ethnic minorities parties
- Serbs of Romania
- Tatars in Romania
- Turks in Romania
- Ukrainians of Romania
- Walsers – Banat French
