= Uchechukwu =

Uchechukwu may refer to:

== People ==
=== First name ===
- Uchechukwu Deborah Ukeh (born 1996), Nigerian badminton player
- Uchechukwu Eberechukwu Nwaneri (1984-2022), American football guard
- Uchechukwu Iheadindu (born 1979), Romanian professional basketball player
- Uchechukwu N. Maduako, Nigerian politician
- Uchechukwu Nnam-Obi, Nigerian politician
- Uchechukwu Nwaneamaka (born 1971), Nigerian writer, film producer, and a veteran actress
- Uchechukwu Okechukwu (born 1967), Nigerian former professional footballer
- Uchechukwu Sampson Ogah (born 1969), former Nigerian Minister of State for Mines and Steel Development
- Uchechukwu Umezurike, Nigerian author and academic
- Uchechukwu Uwakwe (born 1979), Nigerian footballer

=== Middle name ===
- Innocent Uchechukwu Ordu (born 1961), Nigerian Anglican bishop
- Karl Anthony Uchechukwu Mubiru Ikpeazu (born 1995), professional footballer

=== Surname ===
- Amarachi Uchechukwu (born 2001), Nigerian volleyball player
- James Iroha Uchechukwu (born 1972), Nigerian photographer
- Purity Ada Uchechukwu (born 1971), Nigerian professor of Spanish
