= Refugees in Romania =

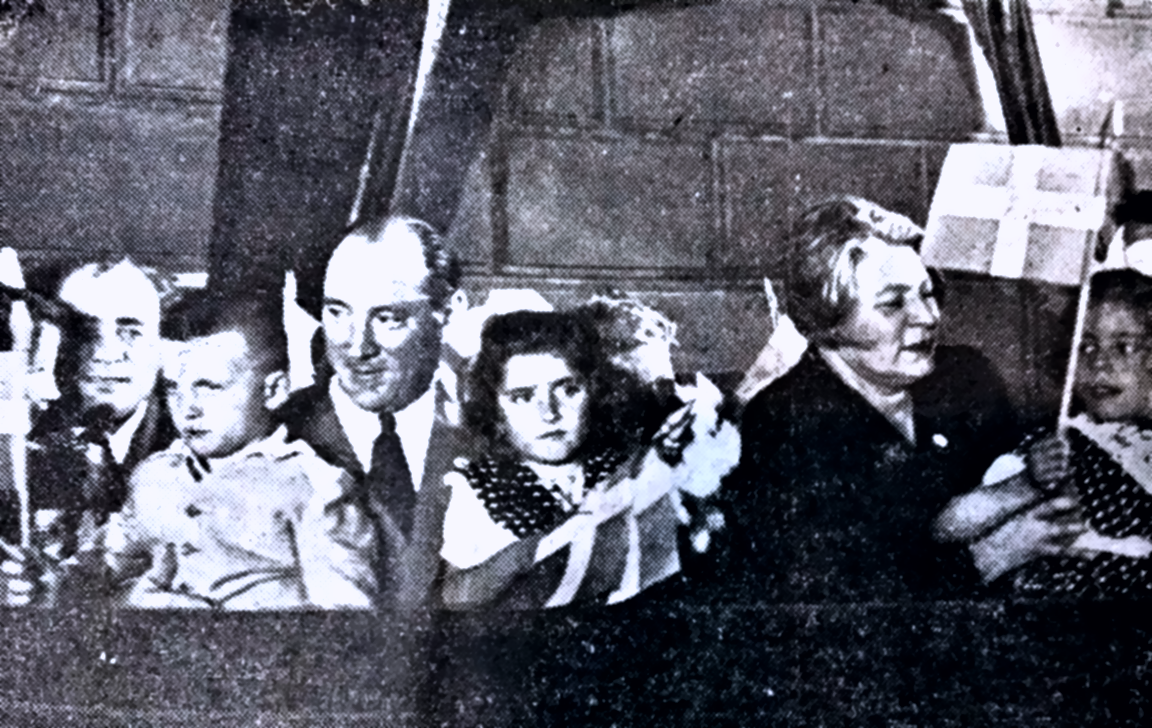
Romanian Workers' Party leaders Iosif Chișinevschi, Teohari Georgescu, Ana Pauker at a function in Bucharest, with Greek refugee children

Refugees in Romania have arrived in multiple waves throughout Romania's history. Historical waves of refugees include the Armenians who fled the Ottoman Empire due to the Armenian genocide in 1915, Greeks who fled persecution after the Greek Civil War and during the Greek military junta of 1967–74, Koreans who fled the Korean War and Chileans fleeing the Military dictatorship of Chile (1973–90).

In the 2000s, Romania received refugees from the Middle East, particularly from Iraq following the 2003 invasion of Iraq, but also from Afghanistan. During the Syrian civil war and the 2015 European refugee crisis, Romanian society debated whether or not to host refugees from Syria. In Romania there are also small numbers of refugees from Somalia, Yemen and Venezuela (including Romanian Venezuelans) as well. In 2020, most asylum applicants were from Afghanistan, Syria, Bangladesh, Iraq, Iran, Somalia, Pakistan, Yemen and Eritrea.

With a population of Romania in 2022 of about 19,000,000 people, Romania on 16 August 2022, according to the UN, received 1,044,292 Ukrainian refugees.

The 2022 Russian invasion of Ukraine that began on 24 February 2022 triggered a major refugee crisis in Europe. By 24 March 2022, more than half a million people from Ukraine had fled to Romania. In connection with the Russian invasion of Ukraine on 24 February 2022, as part of the Russian-Ukrainian war, by 16 August 2022, more than 11,150,639 Ukrainian refugees left the territory of Ukraine, moving to the countries closest to the west of Ukraine, of which more than 1,044,292 people fled to neighboring Romania.
