= Uchendu =

Uchendu is a surname. Notable people with the surname include:

- Andrew Uchendu, Nigerian politician
- Chinaza Uchendu (born 1997), Nigerian footballer
- Ebuka Obi-Uchendu (born 1982), Nigerian media personality
- Nelly Uchendu (1950–2005), Nigerian singer
