= Chinese diaspora in Romania =

Ethnic group

Chinese of Romania 羅馬尼亞華僑 罗马尼亚华侨 Chinezii din România
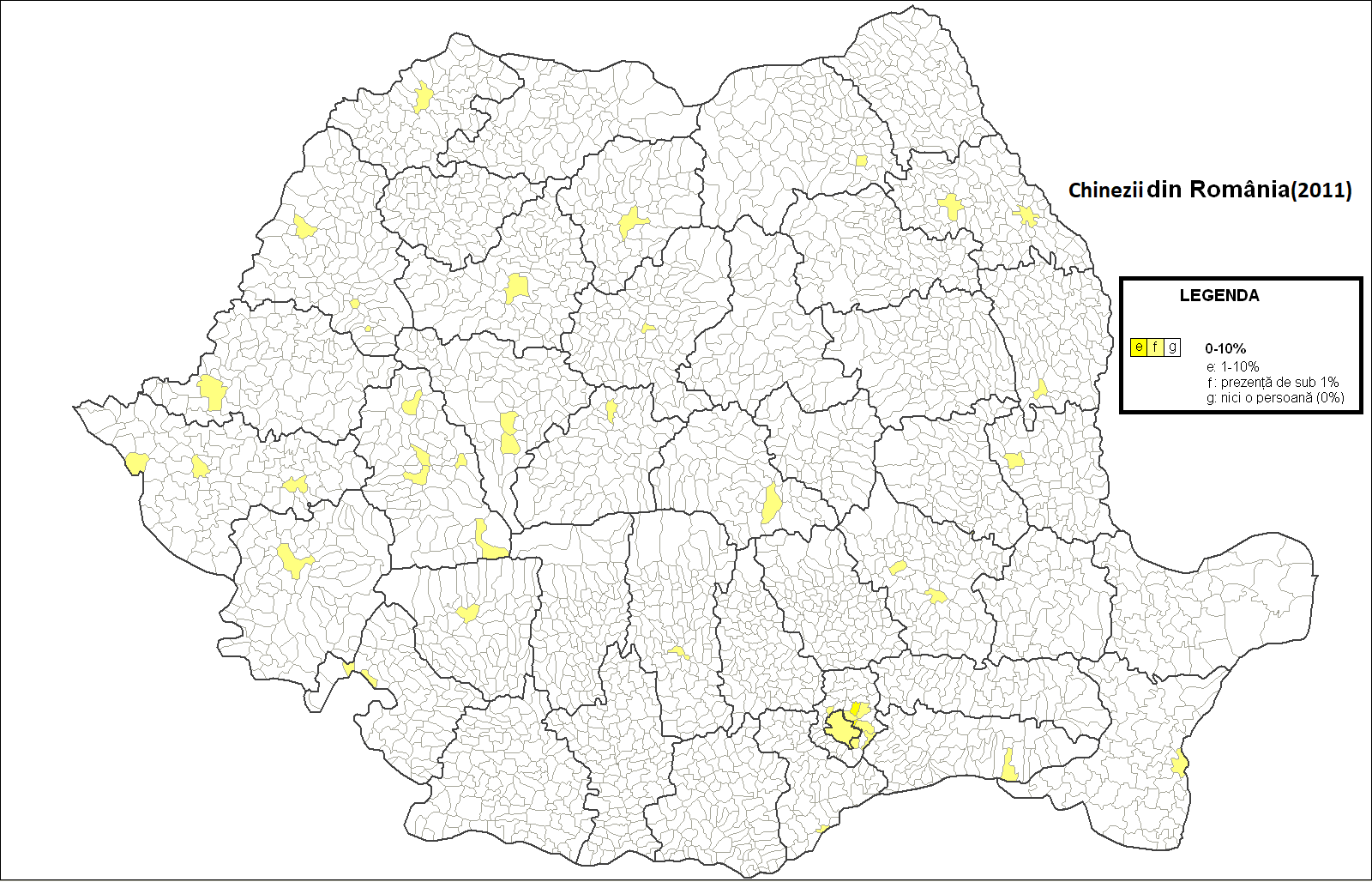
- Distribution of the Chinese of Romania according to the 2011 Romanian census

Total population
- 7,000 (mid-2020) 10,000-40,000 (estimate)

Regions with significant populations
- Bucharest

Languages
- Chinese, Romanian

Religion
- Christianity, Buddhism, Islam, Judaism; Atheism, Irreligion

Related ethnic groups
- Overseas Chinese

Chinese diaspora in Romania
- Traditional Chinese: 羅馬尼亞華人
- Simplified Chinese: 罗马尼亚华人
Transcriptions
Standard Mandarin
- Hanyu Pinyin: Luómǎníyà Huárén
Yue: Cantonese
- Yale Romanization: Lòmáhnèia Wàyàn

Alternative Chinese name
- Traditional Chinese: 羅馬尼亞華僑
- Simplified Chinese: 罗马尼亚华侨
Transcriptions
Standard Mandarin
- Hanyu Pinyin: Luómǎníyà Huáqiáo
Yue: Cantonese
- Yale Romanization: Lòmáhnèia Wàkìu

The Chinese of Romania are one of the smallest minorities of Romania.

== Migration history ==
China and Romania have a history of several decades of economic and cultural exchanges as part of the Communist bloc. Former Chinese leader Jiang Zemin lived in Romania for some time and spoke Romanian. However, mass Chinese migration to the country only began in the 1980s and 1990s, consisting mostly of independent traders. Later, in the early 2000s, as Romania began to suffer labour shortages due to out-migration of its people to western Europe, they imported migrant workers from China as a result.

== Demographics ==
According to the 2011 Census, there were only 2,017 Chinese in Romania. However, popular media give much higher estimates. An International Herald Tribune report in 1998 stated that there were between 10,000 and 40,000 Chinese in the country. A later estimate published by China's official Xinhua News Agency in 2004 also claimed there were as many as 10,000. Romanian newspaper Adevărul stated in 2005 that there were around 4,000 or 5,000, which it also claims is a decrease from the 1990s when there might have been 20,000. Most are men originating from Wenzhou and Henan. Some migrant workers have also come from Jilin and Shandong. They are concentrated in Bucharest, especially in the Colentina area of Sector 2. Most are already married at the time of their arrival, but there are also mixed Chinese-Romanian families (about 500 according to Adevărul).

== Business and employment ==
The China Daily estimated in 2009 that 3,000 of the Chinese in Romania consisted of migrant workers, in the textile, shipbuilding, construction, and agriculture sectors. Due to the global economic downturn, many have lost their jobs and sought the assistance of the Chinese embassy in returning home. As of February 2009, 209 Chinese workers had repatriated, with another 150 to follow. Romania also has some small traders from China, who began flowing into the country as early as 1989. They purchase commodities on credit from state-owned factories in their home provinces and resell them in Romania.

Chinese businesspeople, especially single women, often become the targets of robberies. The thieves show familiarity with their victims' habits and schedules. Chinese media suggest that local criminals are responsible for a rising wave of crime. However, a report from Romanian media claims that much of the crime is due to activities of Chinese mafia who run people smuggling and protection rackets, and that they had murdered more than 20 Chinese between 1993 and 2001.

== Media ==
A Chinese-language newspaper for Chinese migrants in Romania, Chinezii din Romania (旅罗华人报) was established in Bucharest in 1999. As of 2005, it was issued on a weekly basis with 20 pages, and had a circulation of 500. Its editor-in-chief is Li Jianhua (李建华), who has resided in Romania since 1995. Besides this one, there are also three other Chinese newspapers in Romania.

== See also ==
- China–Romania relations
- Chinese diaspora
- Immigration to Romania
