= Uchechi =

- Gender: Female
- Language: Igbo

Origin
- Word/name: Nigeria
- Meaning: Chi's thoughts/will

Uchechi // is a female given name and rare surname of Igbo origin, meaning "chi's thoughts/will". It can be rendered as Uchechukwu.

== As a name ==
- Uchechi Sunday (born 9 September, 1994), Nigerian footballer
- Uchechi Okonkwo (born 12 October, 2010), Nigerian actor, gospel singer, songwriter, producer, and dancer
- Uchechi Kalu, Nigerian artist, poet, and creativity coach

== As a surname ==
- Chima Daniel Uchechi (born 14 September, 1989), Nigerian footballer
