= Majda Aboulumosha =

Romanian actor

- Born: 14 October 1987 (age 38); Ploiești, Romania
- Occupation: Actor
- Years active: 2008–present

Majda Sandra Aboulumosha (born 14 October 1987) is a Romanian actress.

== Early life ==
Aboulumosha was born on 14 October 1987, in Ploiești, Prahova. Her mother is Romanian, and her father is Libyan. Her father left them and returned to Libya when Aboulumosha was a child. She graduated from the "Virgil Madgearu" Economic College, specializing in Services, in Ploiești, and from Hyperion University with a degree in Tourism.

== Career ==
At the age of 12 Aboulumosha appeared on television as a fashion presenter and was later selected to participate in the competition show In al 9-lea cer on Acasă TV. She then landed the role of Lenti, Sile's sister, in the telenovela Regina, produced by Promance International, impressing audiences with her beauty and belly dancing.

In 2009 she played the role of Yvona in Aniela, and then, she appeared in Iubire și onoare as Nadira, the emir Hussein's second wife.

Since 2022 Majda has been the host of the show Vorbește Lumea on Pro TV.

== Filmography ==
- Fructul oprit (2018) – Miriam
- Iubire și onoare (2011) – Nadira el Jisr
- Aniela (2009) – Yvonne
- Regina (2008) – Lenți
