= Agnès Matoko =

- Born: Agnès Matoko; Bacău, Romania
- Occupation: Model

Agnès Matoko is a Romanian model of paternal Congolese descent. She is the niece of the Congolese general Bouissa Matoko. Her father is official treasurer of the Republic of the Congo. Matoko graduated from Bucharest Academy of Economic Studies.

Matoko has starred in music videos of singers such as Arsenie Todiraș, Morandi, Pepe or Keo.
