= Laura Nureldin =

- Born: Iași, Romania
- Education: Hyperion University
- Occupations: writer, translator, journalist, psychologist
- Website: lauranureldin.blogspot.com

Laura Anca Mariam Nureldin (born 11 October 1979) is a Romanian writer, journalist and news anchor. She is of Sudanese descent through her father. Nureldin studied psychology at Hyperion University in Bucharest, and then worked as a news anchor for several Romanian national television stations. She published several fiction novels.

She was born in Iași to a Romanian mother and Sudanese father who studied in Romania during the communist regime.

== Career ==
=== Literary activity ===
In 2015, she published her debut book, Regii timpului, followed by a sequel, Regii timpului vol. 2: Eroare, in 2017. Later that year, she published the first book of the ongoing Demoni series. In 2018, she published Revertis and its spin-off, V. The second book of the Demoni series, Demoni II - Foc was released in 2019. All of her books belong to the fantasy genre and were published with Herg Benet Publishers. She writes her stories in English, then she translates them to Romanian for local publishing. She is also an active literary translator for several publishing houses and independent authors.

=== Television ===
From 1998, she attended Hyperion University where she studied psychology, earning the bachelor's degree in 2002. In the same year, she became a news anchor and editor for Realitatea TV. In 2004, she began working as a news anchor for National TV. In June 2006, she was hired as an editor-anchor for The Money Channel. From September 2010 to March 2011, she worked for TVR 1 where she presented a weekly show, dedicated to women-related topics, called "Papucul Doamnei" (Lady's Slipper). From February to July 2012, she was an international news editor and anchor at TVR Info. From August 2012 till August 2018, she was a news anchor at Antena 3 (Romania). Following a wave of racist attacks in social media aimed at her, she decided to part ways with television. In August 2020, she reconsidered that decision and is now an editor and news anchor for the weekend news programme of Antena 1 (Romania) - Observator.

=== Book editing ===
From May to December 2011, she was a book editor at RAO Books. She translated into Romanian the book I, Steve: Steve Jobs in His Own Words, edited by George Beahm.
