= China–Romania relations =

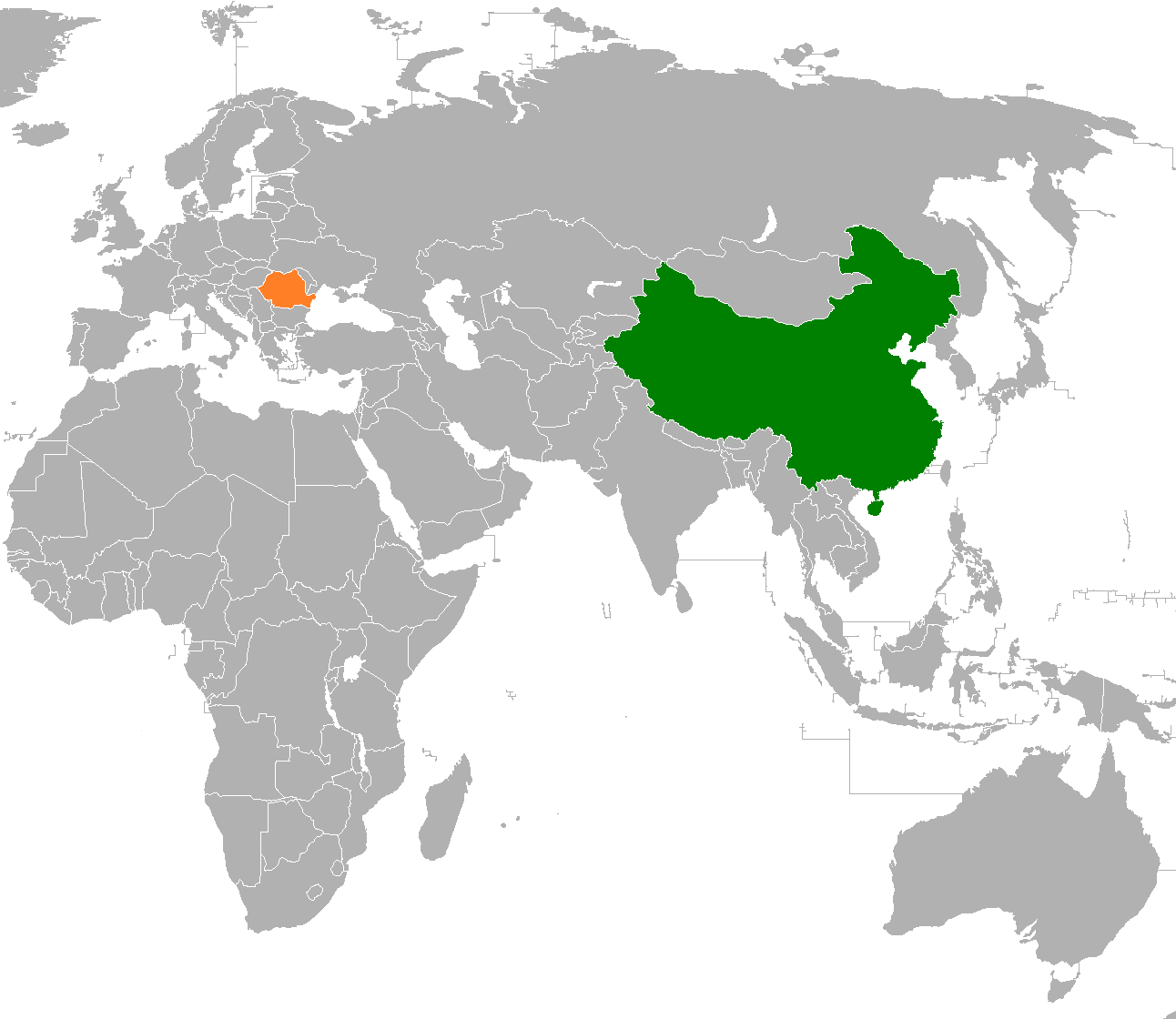
- China: Romania

The Kingdom of Romania and Republic of China (ROC) began relations on July 5, 1939.

== History ==
Following the takeover of the capital of Nanjing in 1941, Romania broke off relations with the ROC and began recognizing the Japanese-backed Chinese Republic. After the surrender of Japan, relations between the two never resumed, but after the Chinese Communist Party (CCP) seized power in 1949 and Romania abolished the monarchy in 1947, the Romanian People's Republic recognized People's Republic of China (PRC) as the legitimate government of China on October 5 of that year. China and Romania exchanged ambassadors for the first time in March 1950.

When the Soviet Union and many other European communist countries withdrew their advisors from China in 1960, advisors from Yugoslavia were among those that remained. Relations between the Romania and China improved after Romania broke off ties with the Soviet Union in 1964.

On 27 December 1989, CCP General Secretary Jiang Zemin held a meeting of the Politburo Standing Committee regarding the situation in Romania, where the Romanian revolution led to the execution of Nicolae Ceaușescu. Despite long-standing ties with the previous government, China promptly recognized the new government.

China has an embassy in Bucharest and a consulate general in Constanța. Romania has an embassy in Beijing and 2 consulates general in Hong Kong and Shanghai. The modern-day Republic of China (Taiwan) has no official diplomatic relations with Romania, although it is represented by Hungary via the Hungarian Trade Office in Taipei and the ROC through the Taipei Economic and Cultural Office in Budapest.

Romania joined the Belt and Road Initiative in 2015.

In 2015, Romania signed an agreement with China General Nuclear Power Group for assistance in building civil nuclear power stations. When the National Liberal Party came into power, it cancelled all projects that the Social Democratic Party government had agreed to with China, including the nuclear power agreement, which Romania cancelled in 2020.

== Educational and cultural exchanges ==
Romania hosts four Confucius Institutes.

== Resident diplomatic missions ==
- China has an embassy in Bucharest.
- Romania has an embassy in Beijing and consulates-general in Hong Kong and Shanghai.

== See also ==
- Foreign relations of China
- Foreign relations of Romania
