= Immigration to Romania =

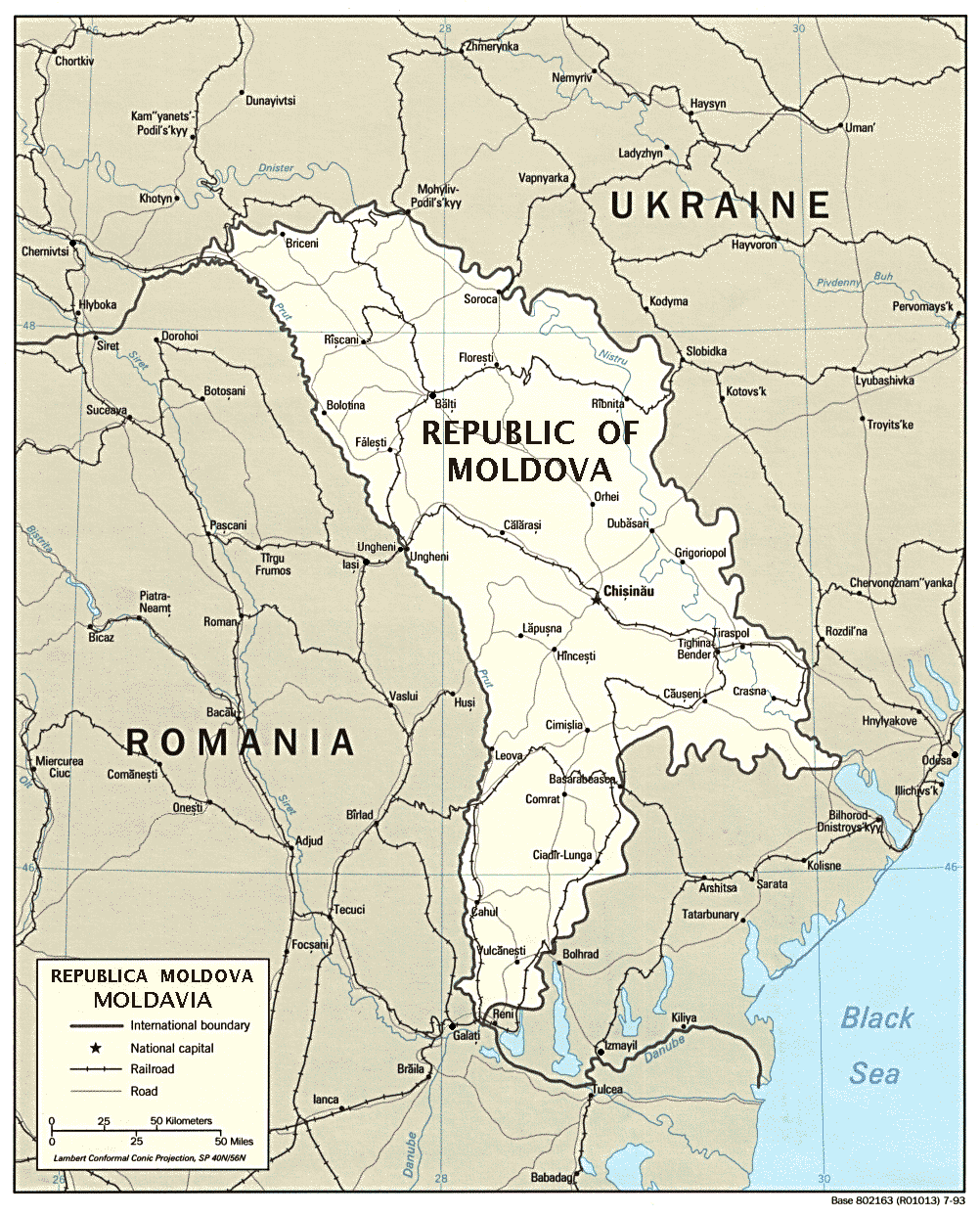
The Republic of Moldova is the most common country of origin of foreign-born residents in Romania.

Immigration to Romania is less common than immigration to most other European Union countries, with Romania having 3.1% of the population foreign born as of 2024, of which 1.1% were born in another European Union (EU) state, and 1.9% were born outside of the EU. Among immigrants, the most common countries of birth were Republic of Moldova (40%), Italy (11%) and Spain (9%). About two thirds of the foreign born population consists of labour migrants.

Romania has recently experienced a growing wave of immigration, mostly from the Republic of Moldova, Turkey, Italy, Spain, Southeast Asia, South Asia and East Asia and to a lesser extent other parts of the world.

According to DIICOT, Romania has evolved since 1990 from a country of transit for illegal migrants to a country of destination. Within the European Union, the country has the second highest rate of immigration from non-EU countries (86%), just behind Slovenia (90%). Most immigrants in Romania are from Europe. Among non-European immigrants, most are from Asia and North Africa.

== Republic of Moldova ==
Over 40% of the country's foreign-born residents originate from Republic of Moldova. Owing to the former period of union between most of Moldova and Romania, many Moldovans are eligible for Romanian citizenship on the basis of descent. The culture of Moldova is influenced primarily by the Romanian origins of its majority population, being strongly related to classical Romanian culture, and, as such, it is easy for people from neighbouring Moldova to integrate within the contemporary Romanian culture. Many immigrants from the Republic of Moldova prefer to settle in the Romanian counties from the region of Moldavia, because there the culture is more similar to their home country.

== Ukrainians ==
After the start of the 2022 Russian invasion of Ukraine, a large number of Ukrainians started emigrating into Romania. This also included ethnic Romanians from the country. By October 2025, almost 200,000 Ukrainians had obtained temporary protection and refugee status in Romania.

In addition to Ukrainians, hundreds of Russians fleeing the 2022 mobilization came to Romania.

== EU countries ==
Immigrants from Italy and Spain often have close relations with Romanians, including intermarriage (see also Romanians in Italy and Romanians in Spain).

== Guest workers ==
In recent years, the Romanian government has approved a quota of 100,000 guest workers per year. In 2023, the most common countries of origin were Nepal (there were 20,892 Nepalese working in Romania in 2023) and Sri Lanka (15,807 Sri Lankans).

During the first half of 2025, the top countries of origin, other than EU countries, for guest workers were Nepal, Sri Lanka, India, Bangladesh, Egypt, Pakistan, Morocco, Turkey, Ethiopia, Philippines. In 2024, they were Nepal, Sri Lanka, Turkey, India.

According to a 2023 study, there were 120,165 foreign citizens (eg. guest workers, refugees, citizens of other EU countries etc) working in Romania. The top 20 countries for such workers were: Nepal, Sri Lanka, Turkey, Stateless Persons, Ukraine, Republic of Moldova, India, Bangladesh, Italy, China, Vietnam, Pakistan, Philippines, Serbia, Hungary, Greece, Germany, Egypt, Syria, France. Over a third of these workers were based in Bucharest, followed by the counties of Ilfov, Timiș, Constanța, Cluj, Brașov, Iași, Arad, Argeș, Bihor.

In 2022, the top countries for sending guest workers were Bangladesh, Nepal, Pakistan, Sri Lanka, India, Turkey, Egypt, Morocco and Vietnam. In 2021, the top countries were Nepal, Turkey, Bangladesh, Sri Lanka, India, Pakistan, Vietnam, Morocco, Republic of Moldova.

A 2022 study on Asian guest workers in Romania conducted in Bucharest, Craiova and Cluj-Napoca, among 400 such workers from Asia (which were from the countries of origin of India, Vietnam, Bangladesh, Pakistan, Nepal, Malaysia, Afghanistan, Indonesia, Thailand, Philippines, Cambodia and Laos) found that almost 40% of them worked in constructions, followed by services and logistics & transportation (including warehouse management). Three quarters were men and 60% were aged between 26 and 35 years (average age 27).

In recent years, considerable numbers of Chinese and Vietnamese citizens work in Romania, due to the emigration of a large part of the Romanian workforce. Many Chinese live in the Ilfov County (the county surrounding Bucharest). There are also small numbers of migrants from Uzbekistan.

Many employers in Romania hire foreign citizens form outside the EU due to the labor crisis. In order to work in Romania, they have to obtain a work permit and a long-stay visa. After arriving in Romania, the foreign citizens have to obtain a residence permit.

Many immigrant workers work in constructions; the top countries in 2021 for such construction workers were: Turkey, India, Bangladesh, Vietnam, Nepal, Sri Lanka, Morocco, Moldova, Pakistan, Ukraine. Other countries include Egypt, China, Serbia and Sudan.

== Arabs ==
Arabs in Romania come primarily from Syria (including refugees of the Syrian Civil War), Lebanon, Iraq and Tunisia. In 2018, most asylum applicants were from Iraq, Syria and Iran. In 2020, they were from Afghanistan, Syria and Iraq.

== Africans ==
Africans come primarily to study in Romania. Africans have been studying in Romanian universities since the Communist Era. Most Africans who studied in Romania during the Ceaușescu era came from Sub-Saharan African countries such as Central African Republic, Sudan, DRC, Republic of the Congo, and from Maghreb, because Ceaușescu had a plan to educate the African elites in order to create political relations with such African countries. It is estimated that during the communist era, about 10,000 Sudanese young people studied in Romania.

Currently, in Romania, most Africans are students, refugees, guest workers or children from mixed-families of a Romanian parent and an African student or worker who came to Romania. In 2020, asylum applicants from Somalia and Eritrea represented the 6th and 9th highest numbers among asylum applicants in Romania.

== Refugees ==
Historically, refugees to Romania have included Armenians who fled the Ottoman Empire due to the Armenian genocide in 1915, Greeks who fled persecution after the Greek Civil War and during the Greek military junta of 1967–74, Koreans who fled the Korean War and Chileans fleeing the Military dictatorship of Chile (1973–90).

Since entering the EU, Romania has also been subject to the migration and asylum policy of the European Union. Romania has, in particular, received refugees from Iraq, Syria, Afghanistan and Ukraine, but also from Somalia, Yemen and Venezuela.

In 2020, most asylum applicants were from Afghanistan, Syria, Bangladesh, Iraq, Iran, Somalia, Pakistan, Yemen and Eritrea.

In 2023, most asylum applicants were from Bangladesh, Syria, Pakistan, Nepal and Sri Lanka.

== Statistics ==
Estimate immigrants to Romania (as of mid 2020, including refugees):

Moldova - 285,000;
Italy - 80,000;
Spain - 62,000;
Ukraine - 43,000;
UK - 32,000;
Germany - 30,000;
France - 22,000;
Bulgaria - 12,000;
Hungary - 10,000;
Russia - 10,000;
Turkey - 9,000;
Greece - 8,000;
China - 7,000;
USA - 6,000;
Israel - 5,000;
Belgium - 5,000;
Republic of Ireland - 4,000
Serbia - 3,000;
Syria - 3,000
Austria - 3,000;
Iran - 2,000;
Iraq - 2,000;
Vietnam - 2,000;
Portugal - 2,000;
Tunisia - 2,000;
Netherlands - 2,000;
Denmark - 2,000;
Poland - 1,000;
Sweden - 1,000;
Norway - 1,000;
Albania - 1,000;
Slovakia - 1,000;
Czechia - 1,000;
Switzerland - 1,000;
Brazil - 1,000;
Canada - 1,000;
Egypt - 1,000;
Lebanon - 1,000;
Morocco - 1,000;
Nepal - 1,000;
United Arab Emirates - 1,000;
Philippines - 1,000;
Sri Lanka - 1,000;
India - 1,000;
Algeria - 1,000;
Pakistan - 1,000;
Jordan - 600; (2017)
Nigeria - 500; (2017)
South Korea - 500. (2017)

== Comparison with other European Union countries 2023 ==
According to Eurostat 59.9 million people lived in the European Union in 2023 who were born outside their resident country. This corresponds to 13.35% of the total EU population. Of these, 31.4 million (9.44%) were born outside the EU and 17.5 million (3.91%) were born in another EU member state.

Country	Total population (1000)	Total Foreign-born (1000)	%	Born in other EU state (1000)	%	Born in a non EU state (1000)	%
EU 27	448,754	59,902	13.3	17,538	3.9	31,368	6.3
Germany	84,359	16,476	19.5	6,274	7.4	10,202	12.1
France	68,173	8,942	13.1	1,989	2.9	6,953	10.2
Spain	48,085	8,204	17.1	1,580	3.3	6,624	13.8
Italy	58,997	6,417	10.9	1,563	2.6	4,854	8.2
Netherlands	17,811	2,777	15.6	748	4.2	2,029	11.4
Greece	10,414	1,173	11.3	235	2.2	938	9.0
Sweden	10,522	2,144	20.4	548	5.2	1,596	15.2
Austria	9,105	1,963	21.6	863	9.5	1,100	12.1
Belgium	11,743	2,247	19.1	938	8.0	1,309	11.1
Portugal	10,467	1,684	16.1	378	3.6	1,306	12.5
Denmark	5,933	804	13.6	263	4.4	541	9.1
Finland	5,564	461	8.3	131	2.4	330	5.9
Poland	36,754	933	2.5	231	0.6	702	1.9
Czech Republic	10,828	764	7.1	139	1.3	625	5.8
Hungary	9,600	644	6.7	342	3.6	302	3.1
Romania	19,055	530	2.8	202	1.1	328	1.7
Slovakia	5,429	213	3.9	156	2.9	57	1.0
Bulgaria	6,448	169	2.6	58	0.9	111	1.7
Ireland	5,271	1,150	21.8	348	6.6	802	15.2

== See also ==
- Opposition to immigration
- Remigration
- Immigration to Europe
- Demographics of Romania
- List of countries by immigrant population
- Refugees in Romania
