= Uchechukwu Iheadindu =

Romanian basketball player

Personal information
- Born: June 29, 1979 (age 47) Bucharest, Romania
- Listed height: 6 ft 5 in (1.96 m)

Career information
- High school: CSȘ4
- Position: Forward

Career history
- 2001–2002: Vega-Asesoft Ploiești
- 2002–2004: Rompetrol București
- 2004–2007: Dinamo București
- 2007–2008: U-Mobitelco Cluj
- 2008–2009: BCMUS Argeș Pitești

Career highlights
- Romanian League Finalist (2005, 2008); Romanian League All-Star Game (2005)

Uchechukwu Iheadindu (born June 29, 1979) is a Romanian professional basketball player who played for the Romanian national basketball team in the international competitions between 2005 and 2007. He is of Nigerian descent through his father.
