= List of Survivor (Romanian TV series) contestants =

Survivor România is a Romanian reality game show based on the international Survivor format. The season premiered on 18 January 2020 on Kanal D. The Contestants are referred to as "castaways", and they compete against one another to become the "Sole Survivor" and win the grand prize of €50.000. By the third season, the prize for the winner had been increased to €100.000. Each season features 20 or 24 contestants divided into two tribes: "Faimoșii", composed of twelve high-achievers who excelled in their fields, and "Războinicii", composed of twelve everyday Romanians.

Over the course of seven seasons, a total of 200 people have participated in the program, 26 of those participants have competed in two seasons.

== Contestants ==
All information is accurate as of the time the season was filmed and thus may vary from season to season for returning players.

Contestant played the game for a second time

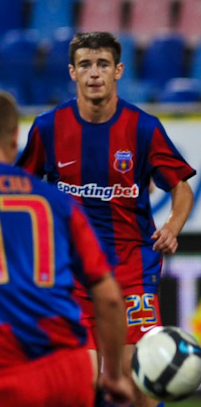
Mihai Onicaș

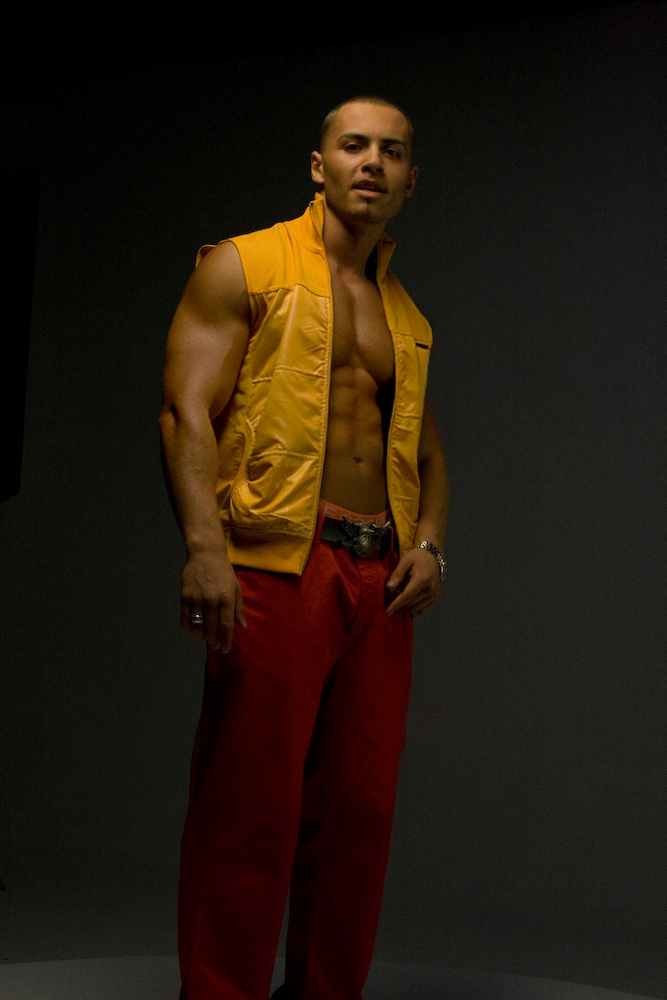
Sonny Flame

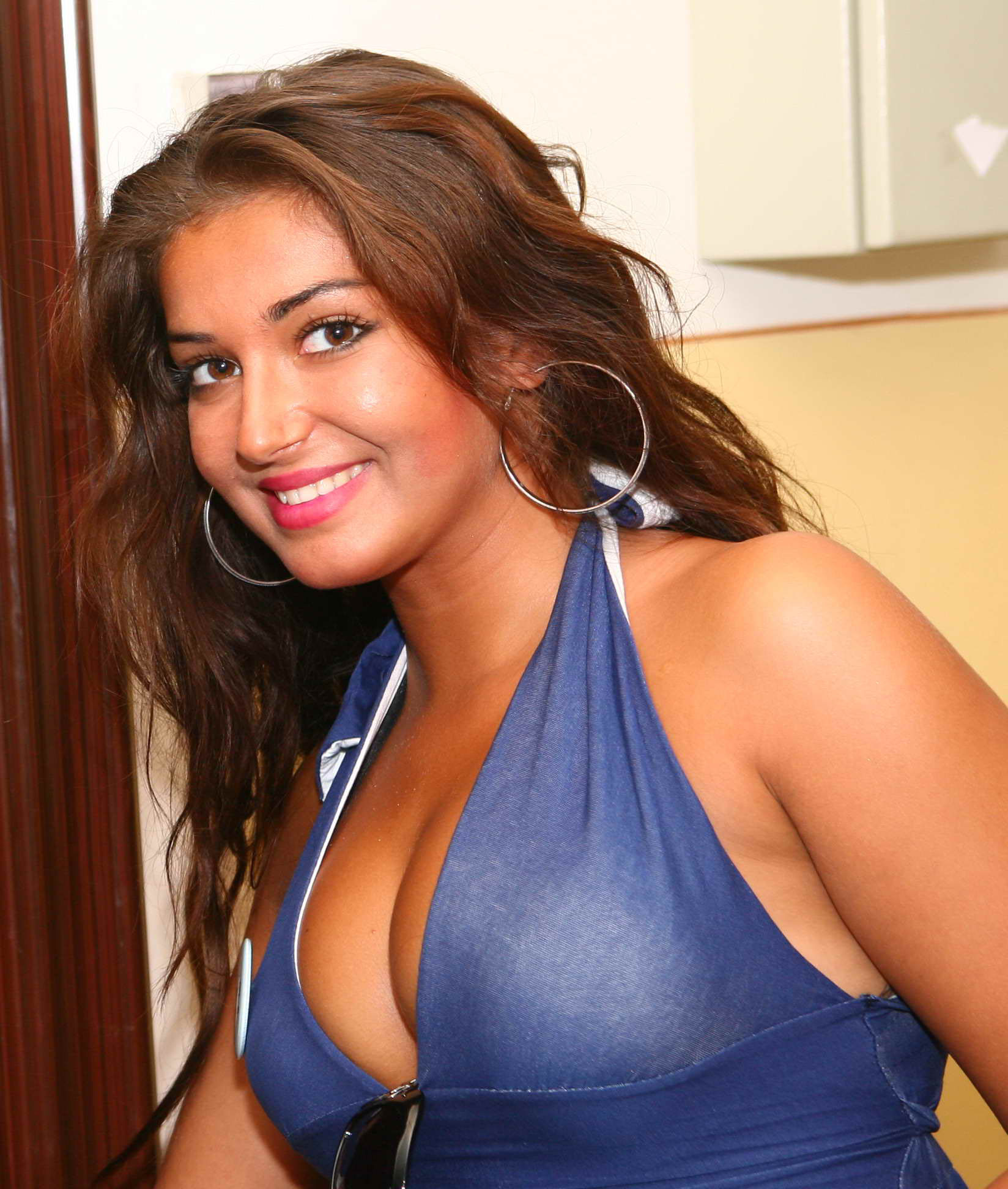
Elena Ionescu

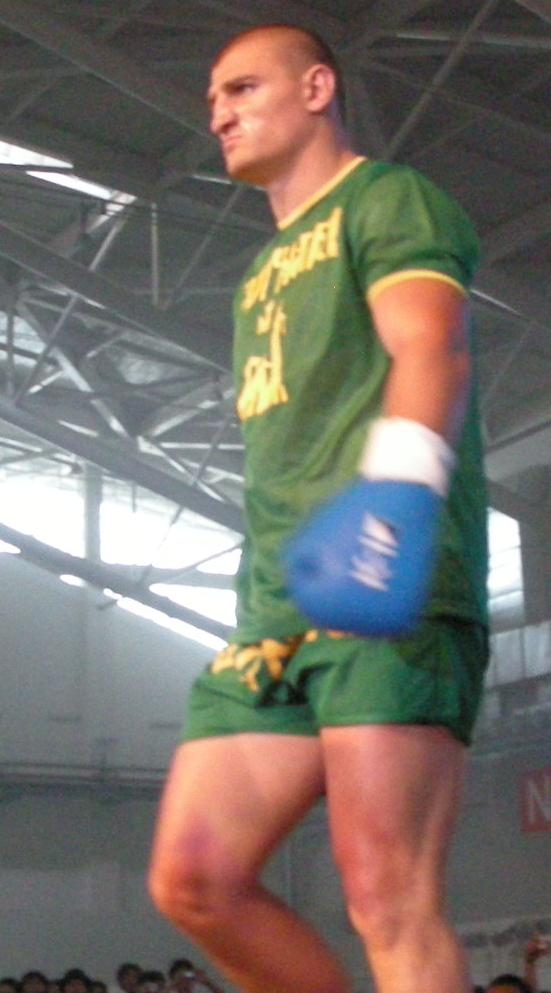
Cătălin Moroșanu

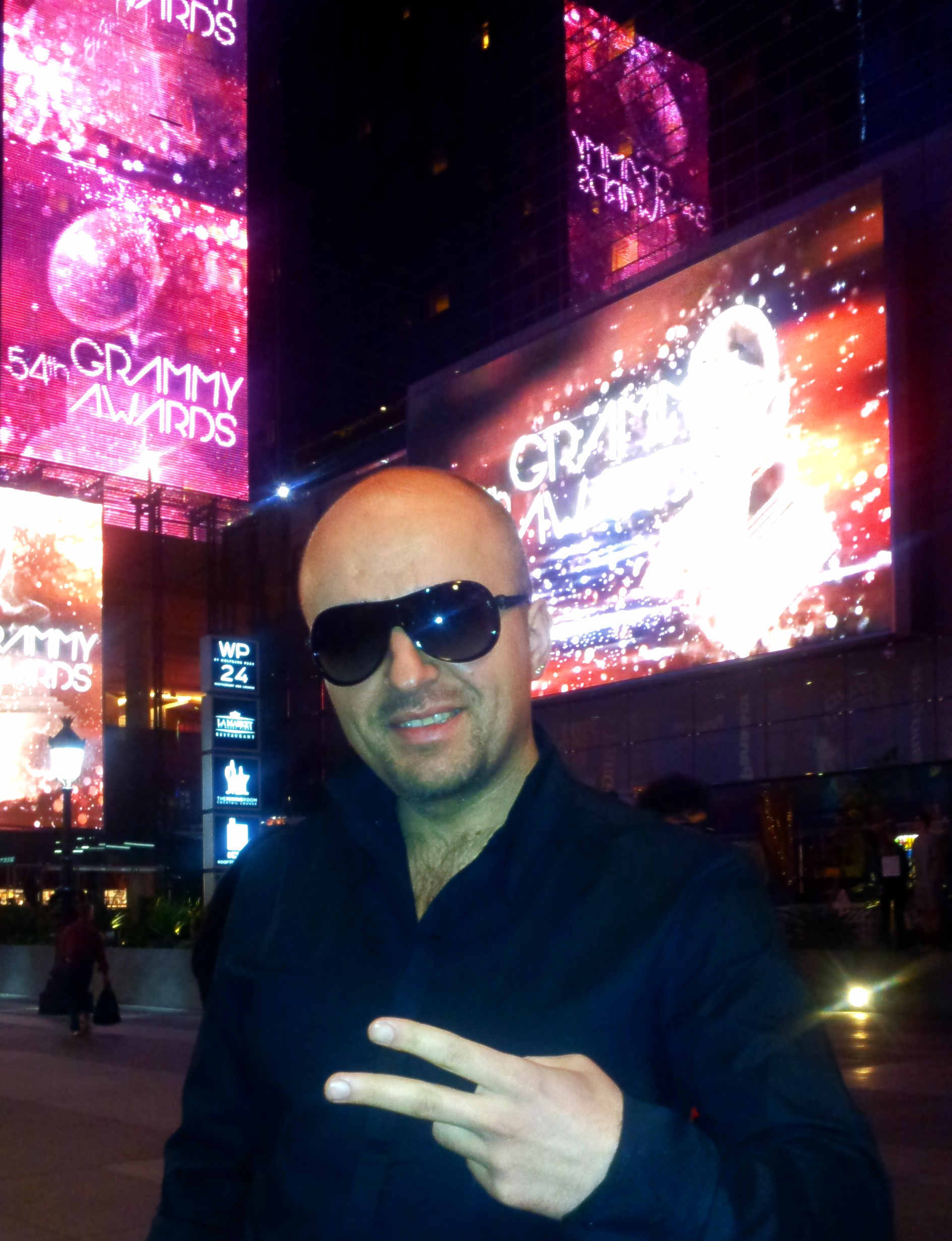
Costi Ioniță

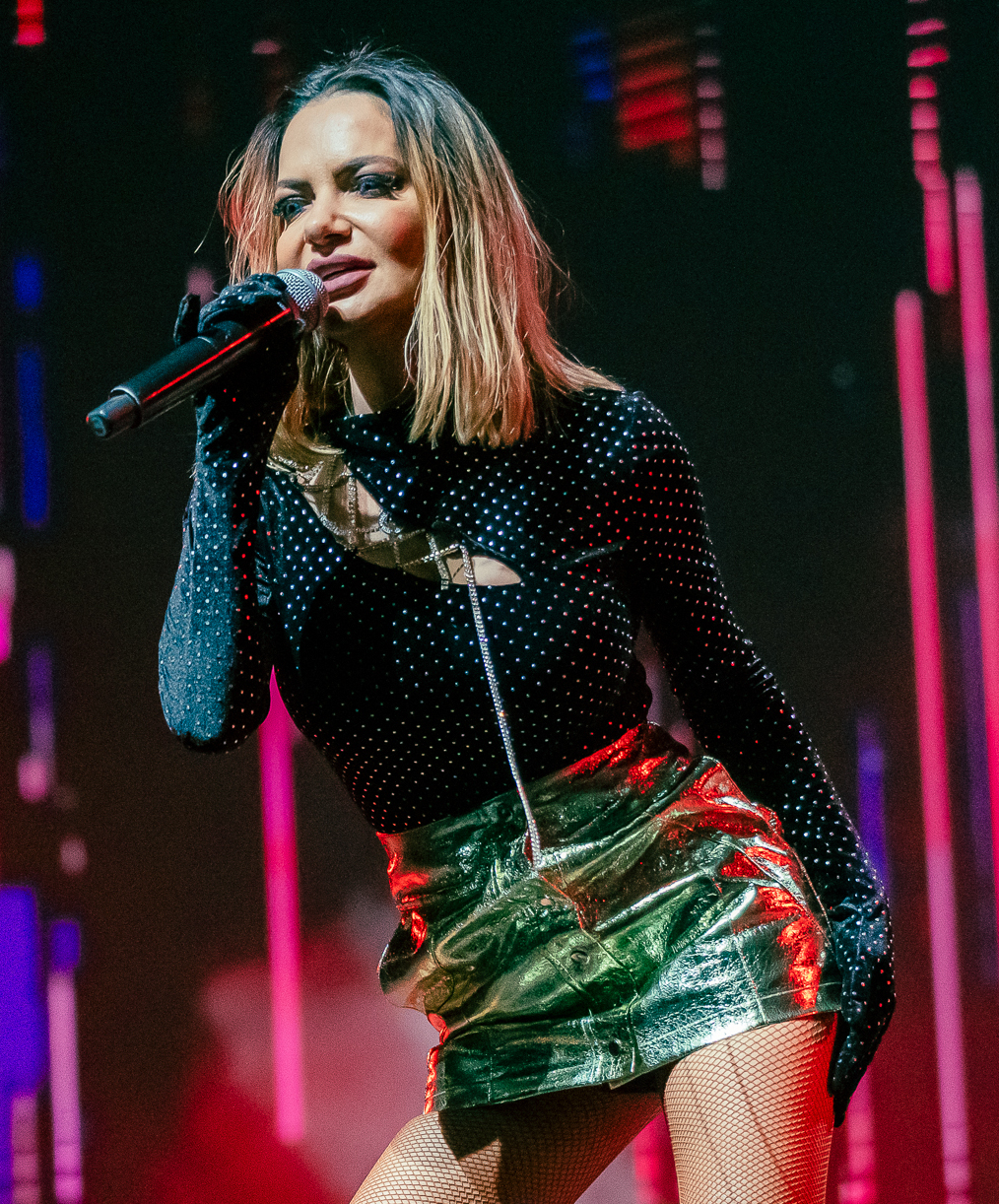
Andreea Antonescu

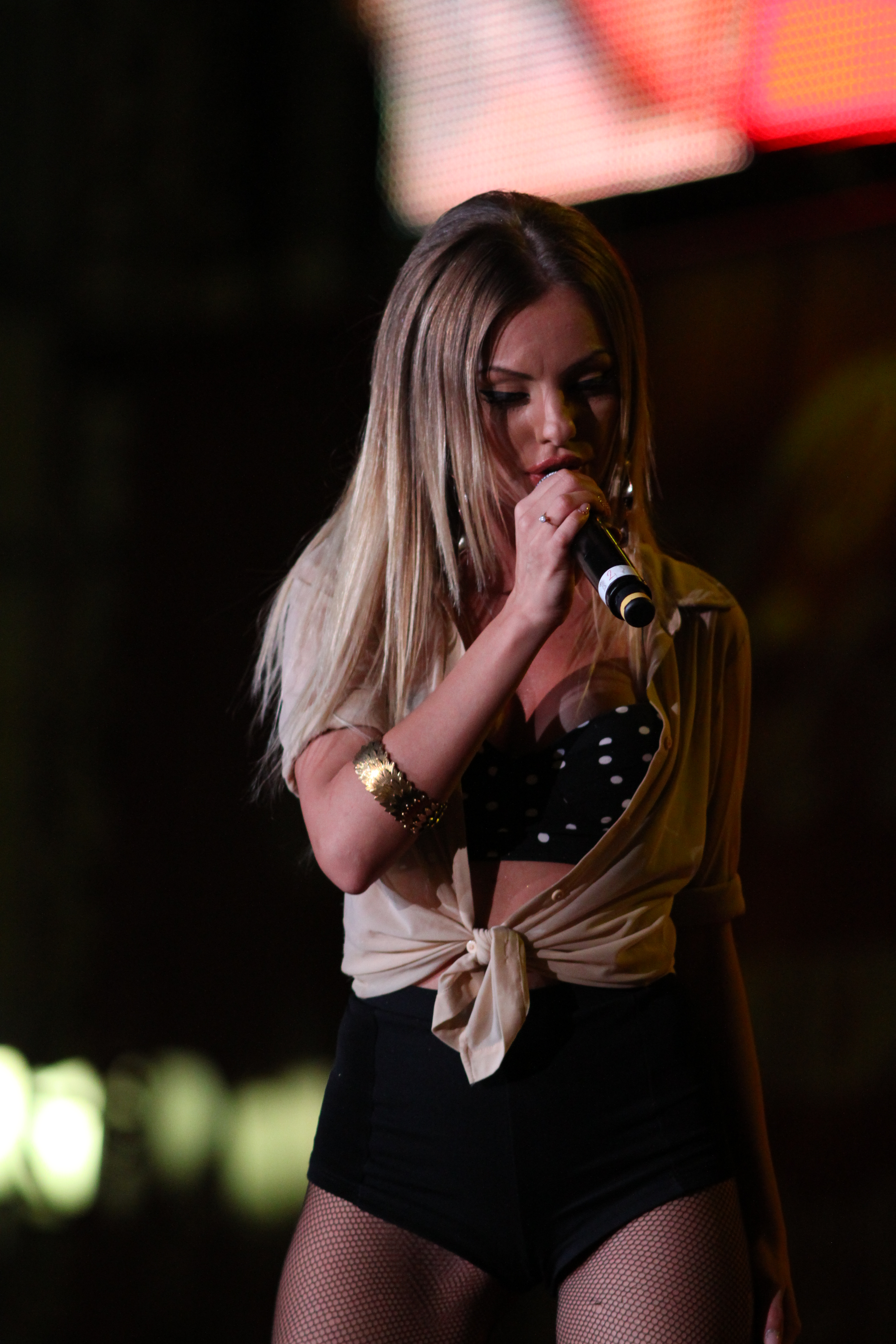
Alexandra Stan

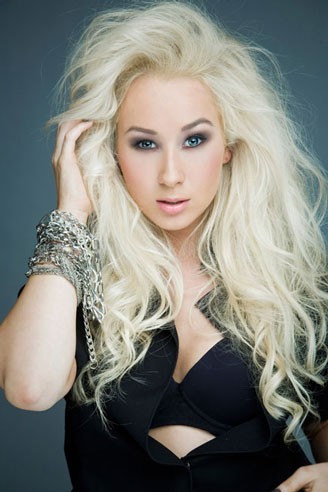
Xonia

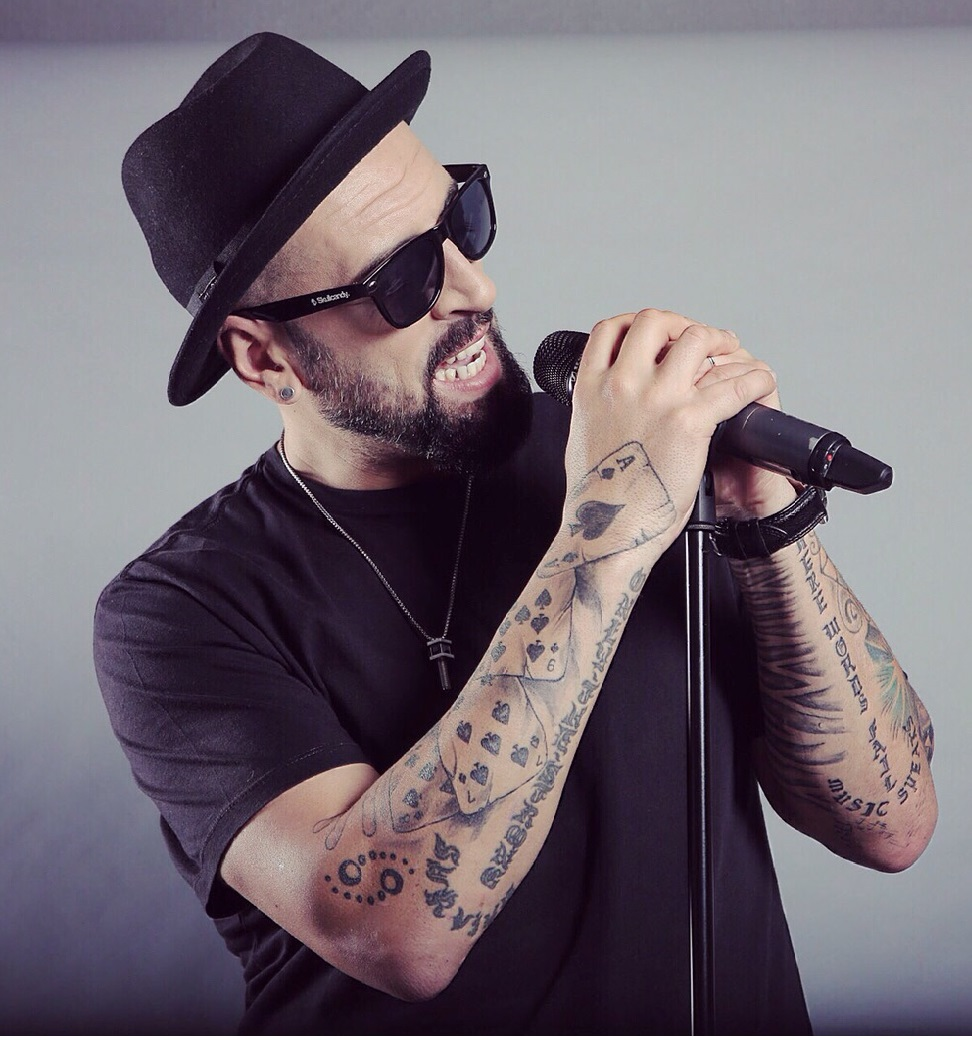
CRBL

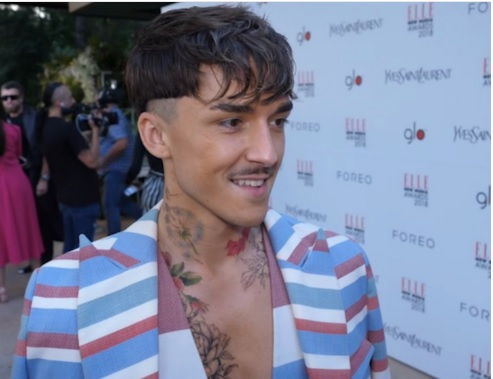
Emil Rengle

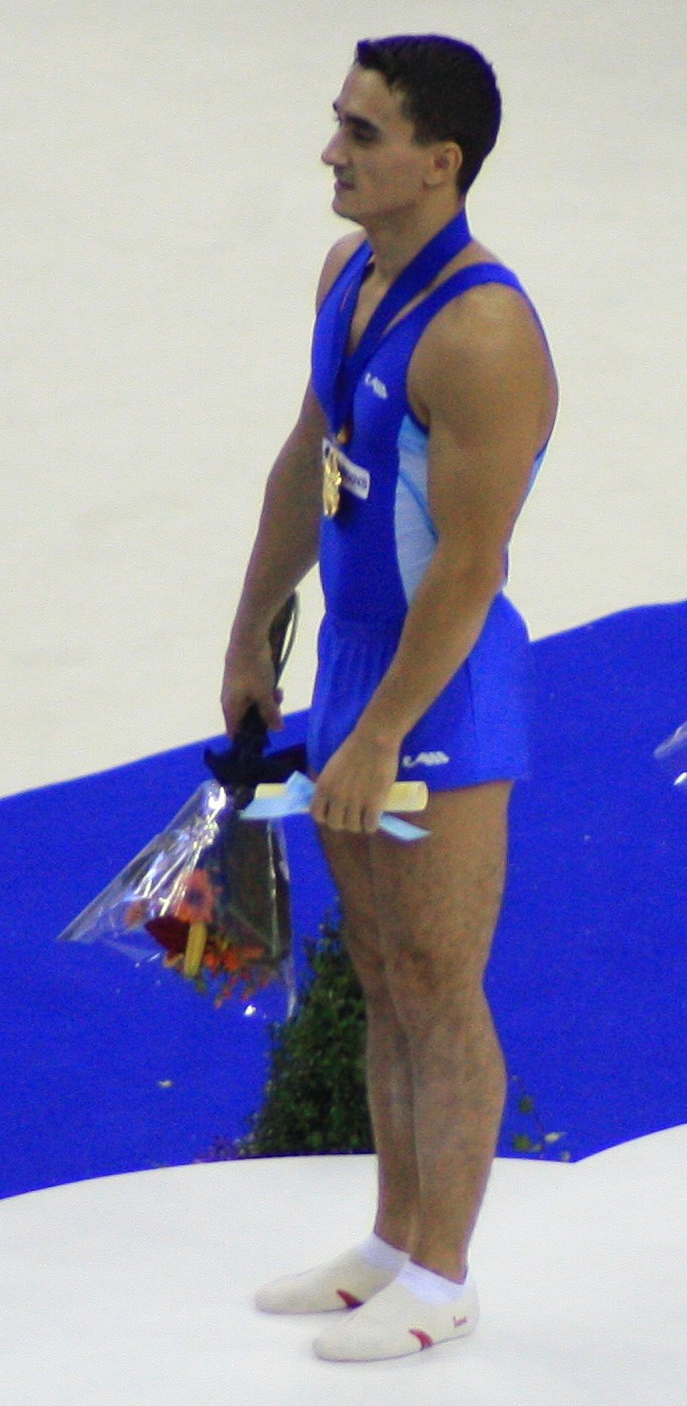
Marian Drăgulescu

[[File:Kamara Ghedi]]
Kamara artist Trupul Alb Negru.JPG

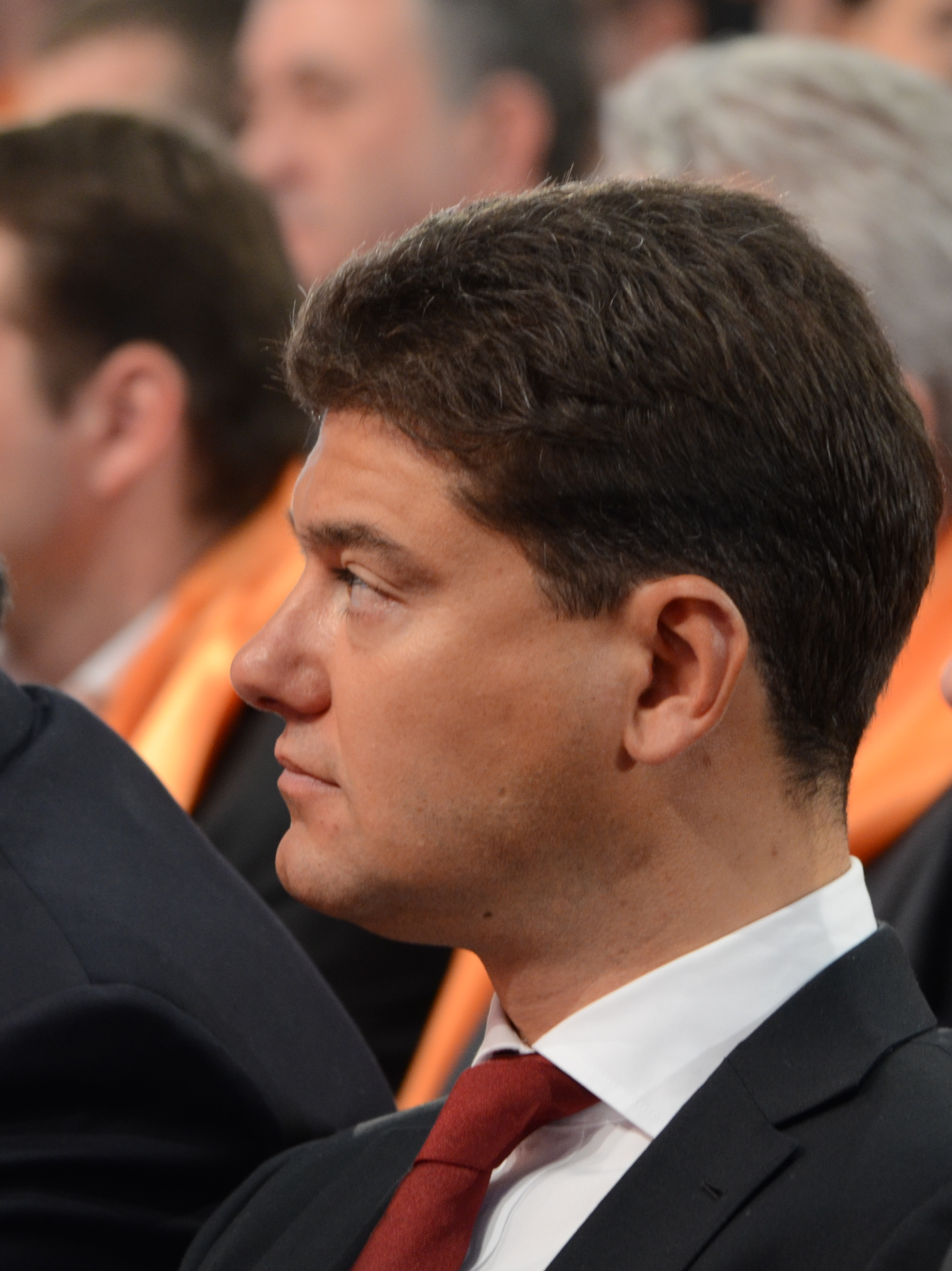
Cristian Boureanu

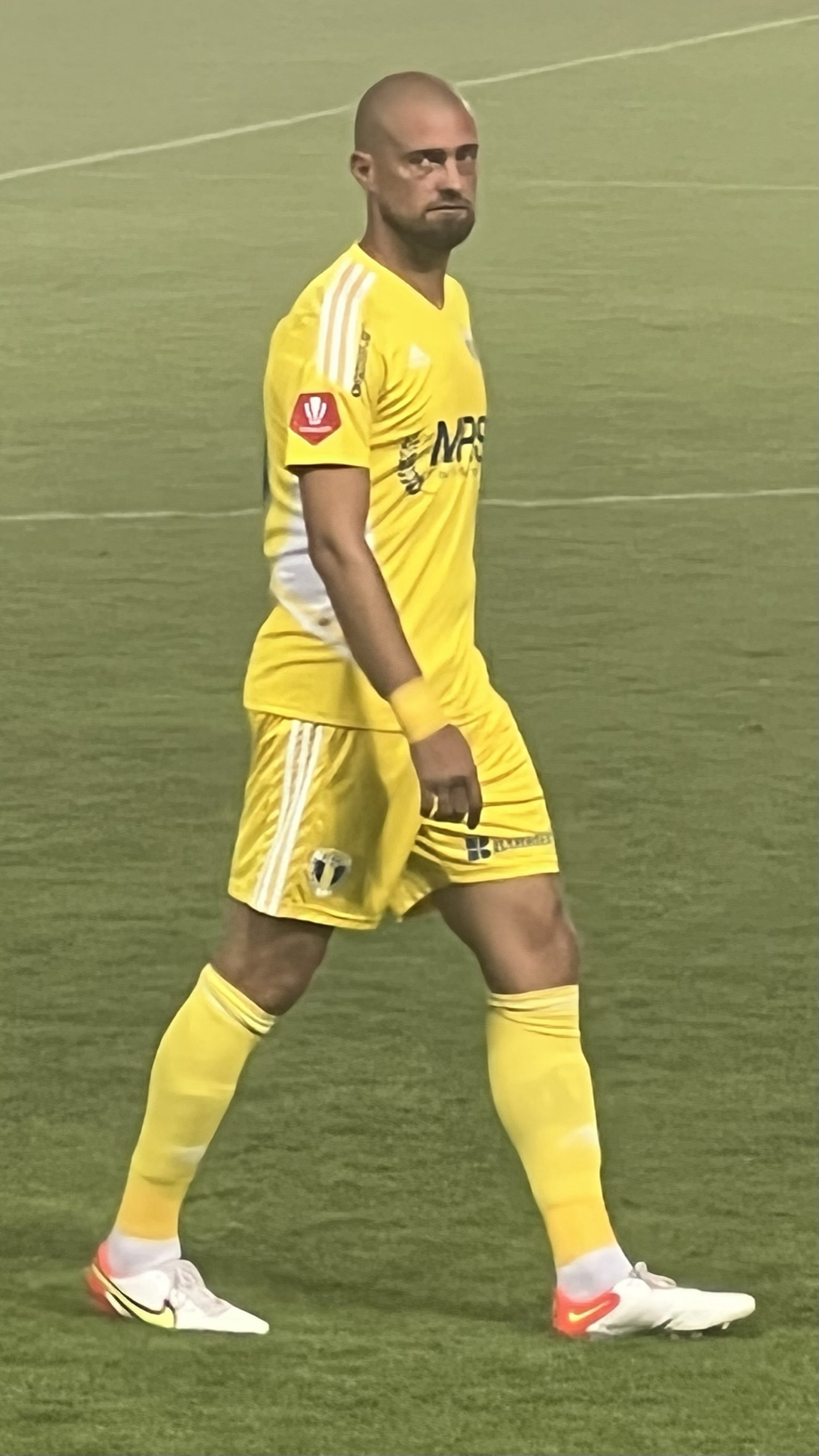
Gabriel Tamaș

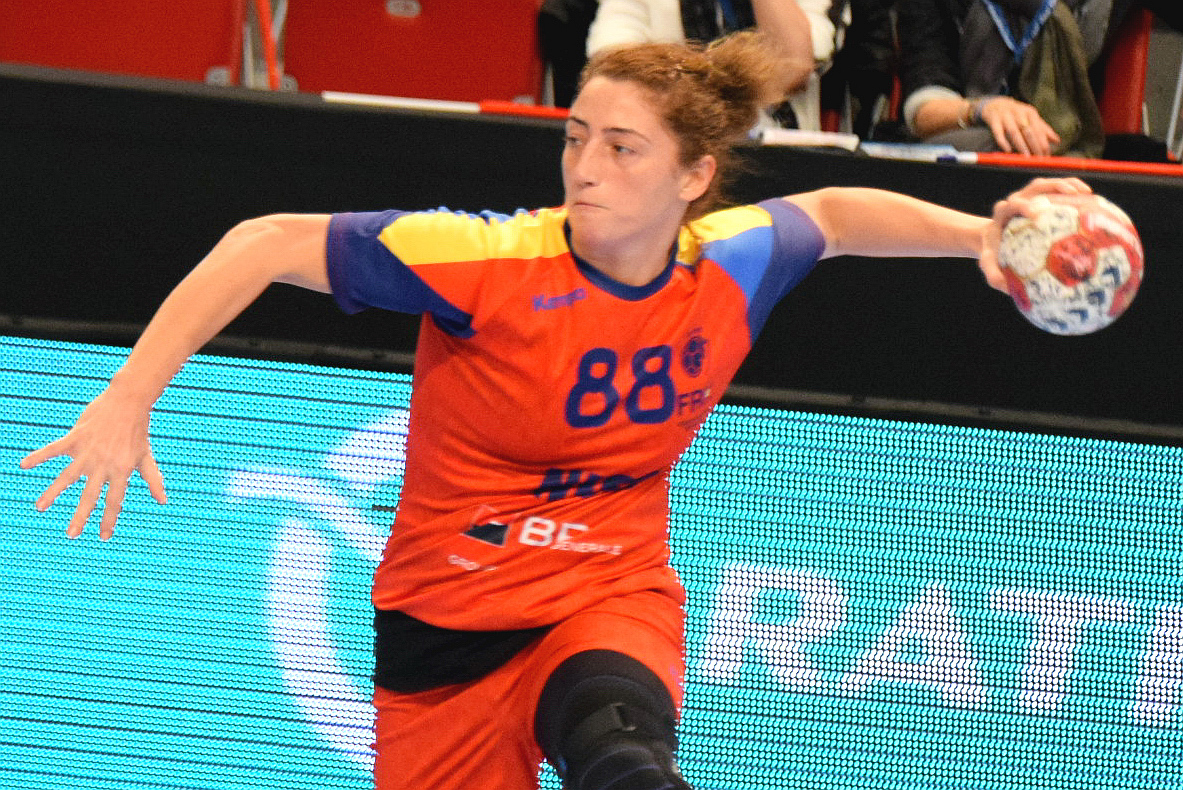
Patricia Vizitiu

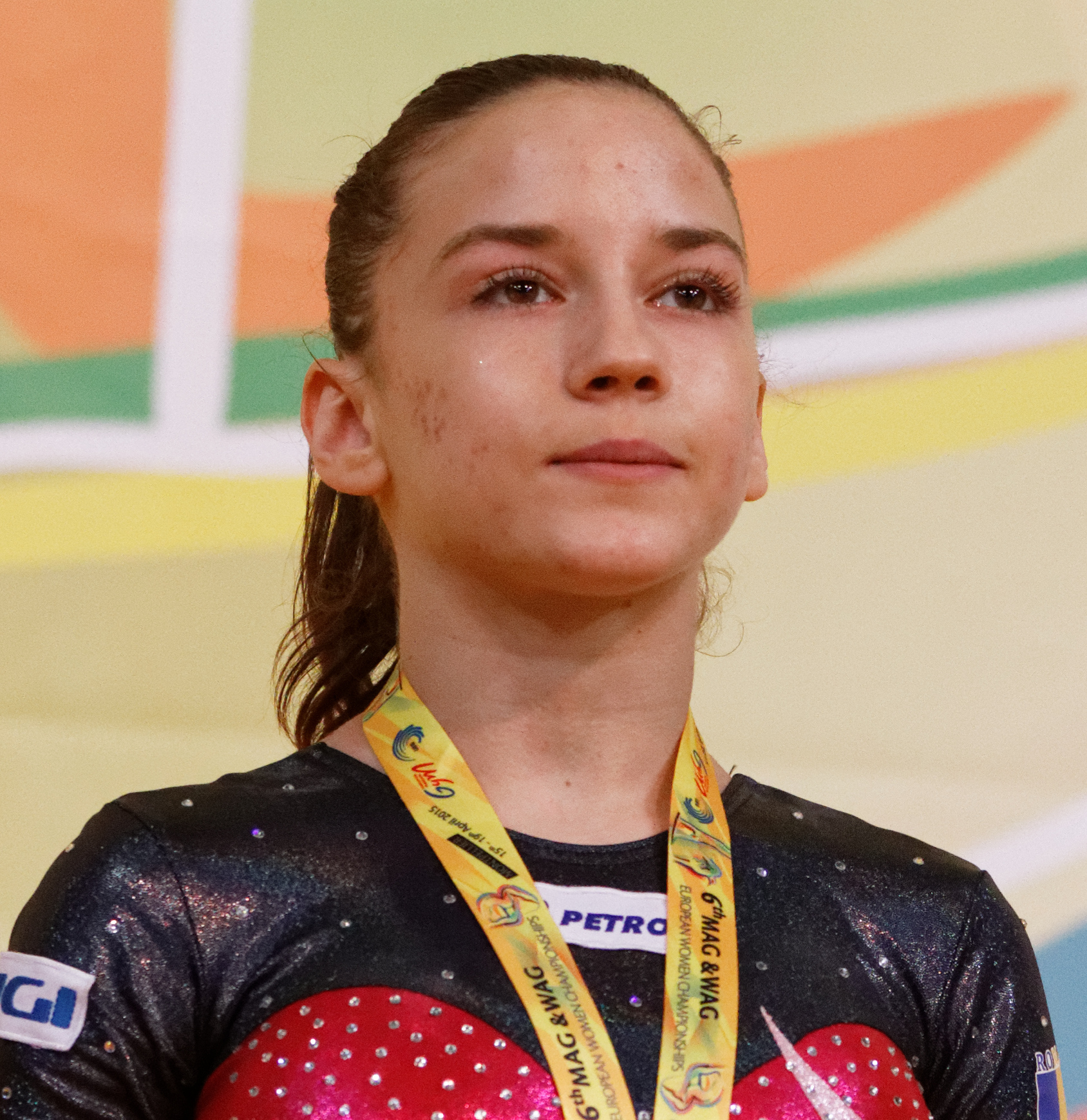
Andreea Munteanu

Name	Age	From	Profession	Season	Finish	Votes Against	Procentage
Augustin Viziru	39	Bucharest	Actor	Season 1	29th	0	0.00%
Cristina Șișcanu	35	Ungheni, Moldova	Journalist	Season 1	28th	6	0.00%
Claudia "Ruby" Grigore	31	Medgidia, Constanța	Dance-pop singer	Season 1	27th	2	15.00%
Cornel Chirică	27	Bucharest	Fitness instructor	Season 1	26th	0	0.00%
Lino Golden	22	Brașov, Brașov	Hip-hop / rap singer	Season 1	25th	2	13.00%
Bogdan Vlădău	40	Bucharest	Model	Season 1	24th	7	11.00%
Alexandra Soare	24	Bucharest	Tennis player	Season 1	23rd	0	60.00%
Ana Maria Pal	26	Bacău, Bacău	MMA fighter	Season 1	22nd	0	67.00%
Claudia Rostaș	28	Beclean, Bistrița-Năsăud	Cleaner	Season 1	21st	9	67.00%
Raul Cormoș	24	Baia Mare, Maramureș	Fitness instructor	Season 1	20nd	4	30.00%
Remus Mihai	41	Bucharest	Pilot	Season 1	19th	17	31.00%
Adriana Popescu	30	Bucharest	Rugby player	Season 1	18th	4	65.00%
Andi Constantin	28	Băicoi, Prahova	Fitness model	Season 1	17th	8	43.00%
Grațiela Teohari Duban	33	Buzău, Buzău	Theater actress	Season 1	16th	11	42.00%
Cristian Ioniță	27	Bucharest	Restaurant manager	Season 1	15th	7	45.00%
Sonny Flame	33	Ploiești, Prahova	Raggae singer	Season 1	14th	7	30.00%
Mihai Onicaș	30	Cluj-Napoca, Cluj	Footballer	Season 1	13th	12	35.00%
Alice Andrucă	23	Bucharest	Fitness instructor	Season 1	12th	12	40.00%
Asiana Peng	20	Deva, Hunedoara	Former elite gymnast	Season 1	11th	17	48.00%
Karina Fetica	24	Craiova, Dolj	Student	Season 1	10th	7	62.00%
Andrei Ciobanu	29	Bacău, Bacău	Music teacher	Season 1	9th	9	58.00%
Carmen Emanuela "Ema" Huruială	30	Reșița, Caraș-Severin	Accountant	Season 1	8th	12	50.00%
Ghiță Balmuș	27	Arad, Arad	Basketball player	Season 1	7th	16	42.00%
Emy Alupei	21	Bucharest	Trapper	Season 1	6th	3	59.00%
Cezar Juratoni	31	Deva, Hunedoara	Professional boxer	Season 1	5th	9	45.00%
Lola Crudu	33	Chișinău, Moldova	Fitness instructor and insurance agent	Season 1	4th	21	75.00%
Iancu Sterp	21	Tuștea, Hunedoara	Student	Season 1	3rd	7	50.00%
Emanuel Neagu	23	Cocorăștii Colț, Prahova	Dancer	Season 1	2nd	1	51.00%
Elena Ionescu	32	Caracal, Olt	Pop singer	Season 1	1st	28	50.00%
Lucian Barbu	33	Bacău, Bacău	Swimming teacher	Season 2	41st	0	17.64%
Cristina Andreea "Amna" Frunzăreanu	36	Slatina, Olt	Dance-pop singer	Season 2	40th	12	28.57%
Costi Ioniță	43	Constanța, Constanța	Record producer	Season 2	39th	5	14.28%
Andreea Moșneagu	31	Suceava, Suceava	Border police officer	Season 2	38th	10	50.00%
Georgiana Lupu	24	Bacău, Bacău	Athlete	Season 2	37th	6	18.18%
Mihaela Berteanu	24	Brașov, Brașov	Guidance counselor	Season 2	36th	1	18.75%
Marilena Cuciurean	26	Vatra Dornei, Suceava	Fitness instructor	Season 2	35th	14	75.00%
Alexandra Stan	31	Constanța, Constanța	International singer and songwriter	Season 2	34th	13	47.36%
Alin Sălăjean	35	Câmpia Turzii, Cluj	Event presenter	Season 2	33rd	16	30.00%
Simona Hapciuc	31	Bucharest	Actress	Season 2	32nd	7	50.00%
Roxana Ghiță	22	Bucharest	Fitness instructor	Season 2	31st	5	62.50%
Majda Aboulumosha	33	Ploiești, Prahova	Actress	Season 2	30th	5	50.00%
Musty Camara	39	Bucharest	Sound engineer	Season 2	29th	11	31.57%
Romina Géczi	35	Timișoara, Timiş	Massage therapist	Season 2	28th	1	63.16%
Andreea Antonescu	38	Galaţi, Galaţi	Singer	Season 2	27th	17	34.61%
Roxana Nemeș	31	Târgu Mureș, Mureș	Singer	Season 2	26th	23	44.00%
Maria Hîngu	25	Gologanu, Vrancea	Assistant manager	Season 2	25th	7	68.75%
Ana Porgras	27	Galați, Galați	Former gymnast	Season 2	24th	4	67.00%
Mellina Dumitru	34	Bucharest	Singer	Season 2	23rd	16	69.23%
Cătălin Moroșanu	36	Cotnari, Iași	Kickboxer	Season 2	22nd	5	30.00%
Vera Miron	34	Brașov, Brașov	Fitness instructor	Season 2	21st	3	38.89%
Ionuț "Jador" Dumitrache	26	Parincea, Bacău	Manele music singer	Season 2	20th	6	44.83%
Starlin Belén Medina	37	Medgidia, Constanța	Zumba instructor	Season 2	19th	4	37.32%
Szidónia "Sindy" Szász	26	Braşov, Braşov	Massage technician	Season 2	18th	1	70.00%
Irina "Irisha" Ceban	33	Chişinău, Moldova	Fashion model	Season 2	17th	4	65.45%
Sorin Pușcașu	30	Ploiești, Prahova	Marketing director	Season 2	16th	26	27.14%
Bogdan Urucu	32	Piteşti, Argeș	Traffic policeman	Season 2	15th	6	17.24%
Horațiu-Adrian "Cucu" Cuc	27	Topa de Criș, Bihor	Musician and vlogger	Season 2	14th	2	22.22%
Culiță Sterp	28	Tuștea, Hunedoara	Manele music singer	Season 2	13th	10	44.55%
Andreea Lodbă	25	Iaşi, Iaşi	Actress	Season 2	12th	4	50.00%
Adelina Damian	28	Galați, Galați	Event singer	Season 2	11th	9	44.30%
Raluca Dumitru	34	Bucharest	Former TV assistant	Season 2	10th	9	50.00%
Cosmin Stanciu	34	Cluj-Napoca, Cluj	Karate champion	Season 2	9th	3	36.12%
Ştefan Ciuculescu	27	Bucharest	Former footballer	Season 2	8th	13	46.15%
Sebastian Chitoșcă	28	Piatra Neamț, Neamț	Former footballer	Season 2	7th	29	29.43%
Albert Oprea	24	Bucharest	Entrepreneur	Season 2	6th	55	37.78%
Elena Marin	33	Bucharest	Dancer	Season 2	5th	19	61.54%
Maria Chițu	20	Câmpina, Prahova	Student	Season 2	4th	13	76.17%
Marius Crăciun	25	Piteşti, Argeș	Marketing manager	Season 2	3rd	9	52.50%
Andrei Dascălu	23	Constanța, Constanța	Boxer	Season 2	2nd	1	50.74%
Edmond Zannidache	22	Bucharest	Trapper	Season 2	1st	7	50.00%
Liviu Mihalca	22	Baia Mare, Maramureș	Professional folk dancer	Season 3	30th	0	0.00%
Loredana "Xonia" Sachelaru	32	Melbourne, Victoria	Singer	Season 3	29th	2	28.57%
Roxana Ciuhulescu	43	Sinaia, Prahova	TV presenter	Season 3	28th	5	50.00%
Andreea Tonciu	35	Bucharest	Television and media personality	Season 3	27th	6	28.57%
Robert Niță	44	Bucharest	Retired football player	Season 3	26th	9	0.00%
Angela Forero Diaz	36	Bucharest	Veterinarian	Season 3	25th	0	66.67%
Ana Dobrovie	30	Târgu Jiu, Gorj	Dancer	Season 3	24th	6	50.00%
Radu Itu	29	Bucharest	Model and hat maker	Season 3	23rd	6	29.62%
Elena Matei	23	Ploiești, Prahova	Chef	Season 3	22nd	2	45.45%
Otilia Brumă	29	Suceava, Suceava	International singer	Season 3	21st	2	44.44%
Emil Rengle	31	Oradea, Bihor	Choreographer	Season 3	20th	2	25.92%
Ramona Crăciunescu	35	Bucharest	Courier	Season 3	19th	3	55.31%
Natalia Duminică	31	Chișinău, Moldova	Belly dancer	Season 3	18th	1	50.00%
Cătălin Zmărăndescu	49	Bucharest	Retired mixed martial artist	Season 3	17th	7	45.00%
Laura Giurcanu	25	Bucharest	Model	Season 3	16th	2	63.33%
Mihaela Stan	21	Bucharest	Swimming instructor	Season 3	15th	3	68.00%
Eduard "CRBL" Andreianu	43	Pitești, Argeș	Hip-hop singer	Season 3	14th	10	38.36%
Relu Pănescu	50	Arad, Arad	Entrepreneur	Season 3	13th	12	20.31%
Alexandra Duli	24	London, United Kingdom	Manager	Season 3	12th	4	62.50%
Mari Fica	28	Târgu Jiu, Gorj	Athlete	Season 3	11th	5	60.00%
Doru Răduță	31	Mioveni, Argeș	IT engineer	Season 3	10th	10	27.50%
Tiberiu "TJ Miles" Iordache	34	Constanța, Constanța	Business owner and influencer	Season 3	9th	19	40.00%
Ștefania Ștefan	26	Lupeni, Hunedoara	Online streamer	Season 3	8th	4	80.00%
Marian Drăgulescu	41	Bucharest	Retired artistic gymnast	Season 3	7th	8	42.86%
Oana Ciocan	24	Bacău, Bacău	Unnemployed	Season 3	6th	3	57.62%
Godspower "Blaze" Okpata	26	Bucharest	Vlogger	Season 3	5th	6	44.83%
Alexandru Nedelcu	36	Orșova, Mehedinți	Footballer	Season 3	4th	4	43.33%
Ionuț Popa	33	Petrila, Hunedoara	Personal trainer	Season 3	3rd	7	57.83%
Elena Chiriac	20	Bucharest	Taekwondo champion	Season 3	2nd	8	57.14%
Alex Delea	26	Constanța, Constanța	Bartender	Season 3	1st	2	58.56%
Maria Constantin	35	Bălcești, Vâlcea	Traditional folk singer	Season 4	30th	1	25.00%
Gabriel "Gheboasă" Gavriș	21	Târgoviște, Dâmbovița	Trapper	Season 4	29th	9	0.00%
Daria Chiper	21	Bucharest	Basketball player	Season 4	28th	1	0.00%
Sebastian Dobrincu	24	Bucharest	Tech entrepreneur	Season 4	27th	0	0.00%
Maria Lungu	28	Chișinău, Moldova	Fashion designer	Season 4	26th	9	55.56%
Răzvan Danciu	20	Gălăuțaș, Harghita	Student	Season 4	25th	1	25.00%
George "Jorge" Papagheorghe	40	Constanța, Constanța	Singer and TV host	Season 4	24th	0	20.00%
Vica Blochina	47	Bucharest	Television and media personality	Season 4	23rd	6	50.00%
Andrei Neagu	26	Constanța, Constanța	Stage actor	Season 4	22nd	12	6.67%
Codruța Began	47	Cluj-Napoca, Cluj	Physical education and sports teacher	Season 4	21st	11	47.61%
Eduard Gogulescu	23	Bucharest	DJ	Season 4	20th	1	0.00%
Alina Radi	34	Timișoara, Timiș	Event singer	Season 4	19th	9	66.67%
Crina Abrudan	45	Oradea, Bihor	News anchor	Season 4	18th	6	45.45%
Vlad "DOC" Munteanu	42	Bucharest	Rapper	Season 4	17th	9	31.64%
Lucianna Vagneti	37	Ploiești, Prahova	Personal trainer	Season 4	16th	11	50.00%
Ada Dumitru	28	Bucharest	Film and stage actress	Season 4	15th	9	52.00%
Mihai Zmărăndescu	23	Bucharest	Amateur MMA fighter	Season 4	14th	3	33.33%
Remus Boroiu	36	Băicoi, Prahova	Body transformation specialist	Season 4	13th	5	45.45%
Kamara Ghedi	47	Bucharest	Singer	Season 4	12th	23	26.26%
Ionuț Iftimoaie	44	Comănești, Bacău	Kickboxing champion	Season 4	11th	18	36.12%
Alin Chirilă	34	Galați, Galați	Professional MMA fighter	Season 4	10th	5	71.15%
Bianca Patrichi	33	Bucharest	Choreographer	Season 4	9th	7	61.78%
Robert Moscalu	25	Murfatlar, Constanța	Bartender	Season 4	8th	10	42.11%
Andreea Moromete	23	Alexandria, Teleorman	User generated content creator	Season 4	7th	23	66.67%
Ștefania Stănilă	25	Aninoasa, Hunedoara	Gymnastics champion and gymnastics coach	Season 4	6th	10	69.57%
Alexandra Porkoláb	32	Brașov, Brașov	Marketing and sales manager	Season 4	5th	13	68.18%
Alexandra Ciomag	20	Bucharest	Model	Season 4	4th	10	65.57%
Carmen Grebenișan	30	Cluj-Napoca, Cluj	Digital creator	Season 4	3rd	23	60.89%
Andrei Krișan	30	Cluj-Napoca, Cluj	Personal trainer	Season 4	2nd	12	51.11%
Dan Ursa	40	Tășnad, Satu Mare	Regional sales manager	Season 4	1st	1	55.89%
Andreea Tonciu	37	Bucharest	Television and media personality	All Stars	26th	9	0.00%
Elena Ionescu	35	Caracal, Olt	Pop singer	All Stars	25th	3	22.22%
Relu Pănescu	52	Arad, Arad	Entrepreneur	All Stars	24th	4	0.00%
Roxana Nemeș	34	Târgu Mureș, Mureș	Singer	All Stars	23rd	10	20.00%
Elena Marin	36	Bucharest	Choreographer	All Stars	22nd	2	35.71%
Maria Lungu	29	Chișinău, Moldova	Fashion designer	All Stars	21st	12	50.00%
Ionuț "Jador" Dumitrache	28	Parincea, Bacău	Manele music singer	All Stars	20th	1	35.71%
Cătălin Moroșanu	39	Cotnari, Iași	Kickboxer	All Stars	19th	2	23.50%
George "Jorge" Papagheorghe	41	Constanța, Constanța	Singer and TV host	All Stars	18th	15	25.00%
Cătălin Zmărăndescu	51	Bucharest	Brazilian jiu-jitsu coach	All Stars	17th	15	22.22%
Oana Ciocan	26	Bacău, Bacău	Sales consultant	All Stars	16th	2	57.62%
Maria Chițu	23	Câmpina, Prahova	Nursing student	All Stars	15th	1	69.23%
Alexandra Ciomag	21	Bucharest	Make-up artist	All Stars	14th	9	58.78%
Lola Crudu	37	Chișinău, Moldova	Operations manager and fitness trainer	All Stars	13th	11	62.50%
Ana Maria Pal	30	Bacău, Bacău	MMA Fighter	All Stars	12th	5	33.33%
Alexandra Duli	26	London, United Kingdom	Receptionist	All Stars	11th	5	53.85%
Alex Delea	27	Constanța, Constanța	Content creator	All Stars	10th	1	57.12%
Ana Porgras	30	Galați, Galați	Former elite gymnast	All Stars	9th	10	63.67%
Ștefania "Ștefi" Stănilă	26	Aninoasa, Hunedoara	Gymnastics champion and gymnastics coach	All Stars	8th	11	64.74%
Ștefania Ștefan	28	Lupeni, Hunedoara	Gaming video creator	All Stars	7th	2	92.00%
Tiberiu "TJ Miles" Iordache	36	Constanța, Constanța	Business owner and influencer	All Stars	6th	8	45.39%
Robert Moscalu	26	Murfatlar, Constanța	Bartender	All Stars	5th	1	48.89%
Sorin Pușcașu	33	Ploiești, Prahova	Entrepreneur and content creator	All Stars	4th	4	39.12%
Andrei Ciobanu	33	Bacău, Bacău	Music teacher	All Stars	3rd	13	43.12%
Iancu Sterp	25	Tuștea, Hunedoara	Amateur MMA fighter	All Stars	2nd	2	54.93%
Edmond Zannidache	25	Bucharest	Trapper	All Stars	1st	13	65.00%
Ema Kovács	33	Timișoara, Timiș	Stay-at-home mom	Season 6	26th	5	50.00%
Alexia Preda	21	Mediaș, Sibiu	Tennis coach	Season 6	25th	5	9.09%
Alex Furman	25	Dornești, Suceava	Magician and tattoo artist	Season 6	24th	0	0.00%
Darius Măcinic	43	Alba Iulia, Alba	Judo coach	Season 6	23rd	7	20.00%
Dorian Afro	32	Bucharest	Choreographer	Season 6	22nd	8	75.00%
Francesca Chebuţiu	30	Târnăveni, Mureș	IT engineer	Season 6	21st	1	75.00%
Roxana Chiperi	37	Bucharest	Aerobics instructor	Season 6	20th	0	39.12%
Silvia Gherasim	44	Timișoara, Timiș	Personal trainer	Season 6	19th	13	52.23%
Cristian Marinescu	27	Bucharest	Model	Season 6	18th	4	25.00%
Mario Longa	19	Cavaran, Caraș-Severin	Student	Season 6	17th	4	64.74%
Filip Mastică	23	Sfântu Gheorghe, Tulcea	Restaurant owner	Season 6	16th	0	33.33%
Izabela Burugă	24	Râmnicu Vâlcea, Vâlcea	Bartender	Season 6	15th	4	52.03%
Adi Coșeru	31	Bârlad, Vaslui	Medical nurse	Season 6	14th	7	43.12%
Laurențiu Troancă	27	Făgăraș, Brașov	Police academy instructor	Season 6	13th	8	41.67%
Sebastian Coțofană	36	Constanța, Constanța	Radio host	Season 6	12th	2	28.57%
Mihai "Bitză" Biță	46	Bucharest	Hip-hop artist and music producer	Season 6	11th	14	28.46%
Ionela Dobre	30	Bucharest	Yoga instructor	Season 6	10th	6	66.67%
Diana Ursu	25	Chișinău, Moldova	Professional rugby player	Season 6	9th	17	75.00%
Larisa Popa	27	Curtea de Argeș, Argeș	Marketing specialist	Season 6	8th	15	52.23%
Diandra Moga	28	Târgu Mureș, Mureș	Fashion designer	Season 6	7th	2	64.82%
Ina Shan	31	Alba Iulia, Alba	Model	Season 6	6th	5	54.69%
Adina Gache	21	Constanța, Constanța	Dancer	Season 6	5th	8	55.56%
Lea Rancz	26	Timișoara, Timiș	Personal trainer	Season 6	4th	6	63.78%
Raul Săpătaru	24	Brașov, Brașov	Physical education and sports teacher	Season 6	3rd	0	56.72%
Vasile Petrovschi	36	Bucharest	IT engineer	Season 6	2nd	2	59.14%
Ovidiu "Uwe Dai" Măcinic	46	Alba Iulia, Alba	Judo coach	Season 6	1st	11	63.25%
Iustin Hvnds	35	Bucharest	Singer and songwriter	Faimoși VS Războinici	31st	4	0.00%
Iulia Istrate	32	Dumbrăvița, Timiș	Chef	Faimoși VS Războinici	30th	4	50.00%
Yasmin Awad	33	Bucharest	Beauty content creator and makeup artist	Faimoși VS Războinici	29th	0	60.00%
Roxana Condurache	38	Iași, Iași	Actress	Faimoși VS Războinici	28th	4	37.50%
Marina Dina	39	Bucharest	Former TV assistant	Faimoși VS Războinici	27th	2	50.00%
Călin Donca	41	Brașov, Brașov	Businessman	Faimoși VS Războinici	26th	2	33.33%
Niky Salman	38	Ploiești, Prahova	Fitness instructor	Faimoși VS Războinici	25th	17	50.00%
Larisa Uță	48	London, United Kingdom	Personal trainer	Faimoși VS Războinici	24th	15	70.00%
Adrian Petre	27	Arad, Arad	Footballer	Faimoși VS Războinici	23rd	10	35.71%
Naba Salem	31	Oradea, Bihor	TV personality	Faimoși VS Războinici	22nd	1	20.00%
Nicu Grigore	38	Bucharest	Talent manager	Faimoși VS Războinici	21st	1	31.25%
Adrian Kaan	34		Entrepreneur	Faimoși VS Războinici	20th	15	45.45%
Vicențiu "Cav" Andronache	47	Galați, Galați	Manager	Faimoși VS Războinici	19th	10	33.33%
Andrei Beleuț	34	Pitești, Argeș	Restaurant manager	Faimoși VS Războinici	18th	11	30.00%
Loredana Pălănceanu	29	Iași, Iași	Math teacher	Faimoși VS Războinici	17th	4	65.57%
Ceanu Zheng	26	Deva, Hunedoara	Content creator	Faimoși VS Războinici	16th	1	28.98%
Olga Barcari	39	Bucharest	Hairstylist	Faimoși VS Războinici	15th	8	52.64%
Alberto Hangan	29	Bistrița, Bistrița-Năsăud	Actor	Faimoși VS Războinici	14th	2	65.00%
Patrice Cărăușan	27	Bucharest	Medical school graduate	Faimoși VS Războinici	13th	6	54.83%
Marian Godină	39	Brașov, Brașov	Policeman	Faimoși VS Războinici	12th	16	34.48%
Aris Eram	22	Bucharest	TV presenter	Faimoși VS Războinici	11th	5	53.68%
Maria Dumitru	24	Bucharest	Judo coach	Faimoși VS Războinici	10th	2	71.43%
Gigi Nicolae	32	Ploiești, Prahova	Fast-food owner	Faimoși VS Războinici	9th	4	20.83%
Cristian Boureanu	53	Bucharest	Politician	Faimoși VS Războinici	8th	18	27.61%
Andreea Munteanu	27	Bustuchin, Gorj	Gymnast	Faimoși VS Războinici	7th	3	73.64%
Bianca Giurcanu	30	Bucharest	Flight attendant	Faimoși VS Războinici	6th	12	66.67%
Bianca Stoica	19	Slănic, Prahova	Physical education student	Faimoși VS Războinici	5th	9	75.00%
Ramona Micu	27	Focșani, Vrancea	Team leader customer care	Faimoși VS Războinici	4th	21	69.23%
Patricia Vizitiu	37	Petroșani, Hunedoara	Professional handballer	Faimoși VS Războinici	3rd	2	71.43%
Lucian Popa	43	Craiova, Dolj	Sports coach	Faimoși VS Războinici	2nd	24	55.95%
Gabriel Tamaș	42	Brașov, Brașov	Premier League International footballer	Faimoși VS Războinici	1st	2	74.14%
