= Survivor România 2022 =

- Season 3
- Promotional poster
- Presented by: Daniel Pavel
- No. of days: 141
- No. of castaways: 30
- Winner: Alex Delea
- Runner-up: Elena Chiriac
- Location: La Romana, Dominican Republic
- No. of episodes: 60

Release
- Original network: Pro TV
- Original release: 16 January – 31 May 2022

Additional information
- Filming dates: 11 January – 31 May 2022

Season chronology
- ← Previous; 2021 Next → 2023

Survivor România 2022 is the third season of the Romanian reality competition show, Survivor România. As with the previous seasons, the season features 24 contestants divided into two tribes: "Faimoșii", composed of twelve high-achievers who excelled in their fields, and "Războinicii", composed of twelve everyday Romanians.

The season premiered on 16 January 2022 and concluded on 31 May 2022, where Alex Delea was named the winner over Elena Chiriac winning the grand prize of 100.000 € and title of Sole Survivor. It was the first season to air on Pro TV and was filmed in La Romana, Dominican Republic from January to May 2022.

== Production ==
In September 2021, it was reported that Pro TV Studios were in talks with Acun Medya, who own the rights to Survivor România, to revive the show in 2022. On 12 October 2021, Pro TV aired a teaser trailer, officially confirming that the series would return for a new series in 2022 on Pro TV. Following the announcement of the series, Antonii Mangov, the Programming Director Pro TV said: "We are pleased to announce that in 2022 we will be adding this incredible format to our portfolio. Survivor is already a successful show in Romania, but we will add a touch of what Pro TV represents, which guarantees top-class entertainment." Filming began in January 2022.

=== Twist ===
The season included a twist called Exile Island. Since cycle 6 till cycle 11, in each cycle after the first Reward Challenge, each tribe must exile one teammate. The nomination is made by the member of their own tribe who achieved the best results in the Reward Challenge. The exiled contestants are sent to a remote location, entirely separate from the existing camps, where they will fend for themselves until last Reward Challenge of the cycle.

=== Broadcast ===
It was initially broadcast from January 16 to May 21, 2022 on Pro TV and Voyo and airs on Sundays, Mondays and Tuesdays at 8:30 pm.

== Contestants ==
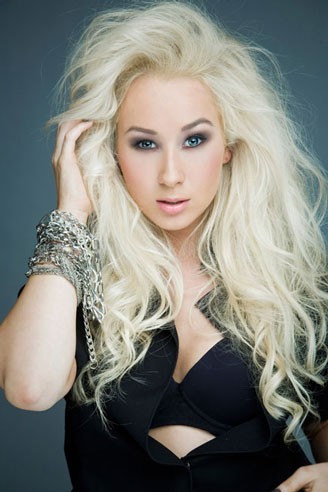
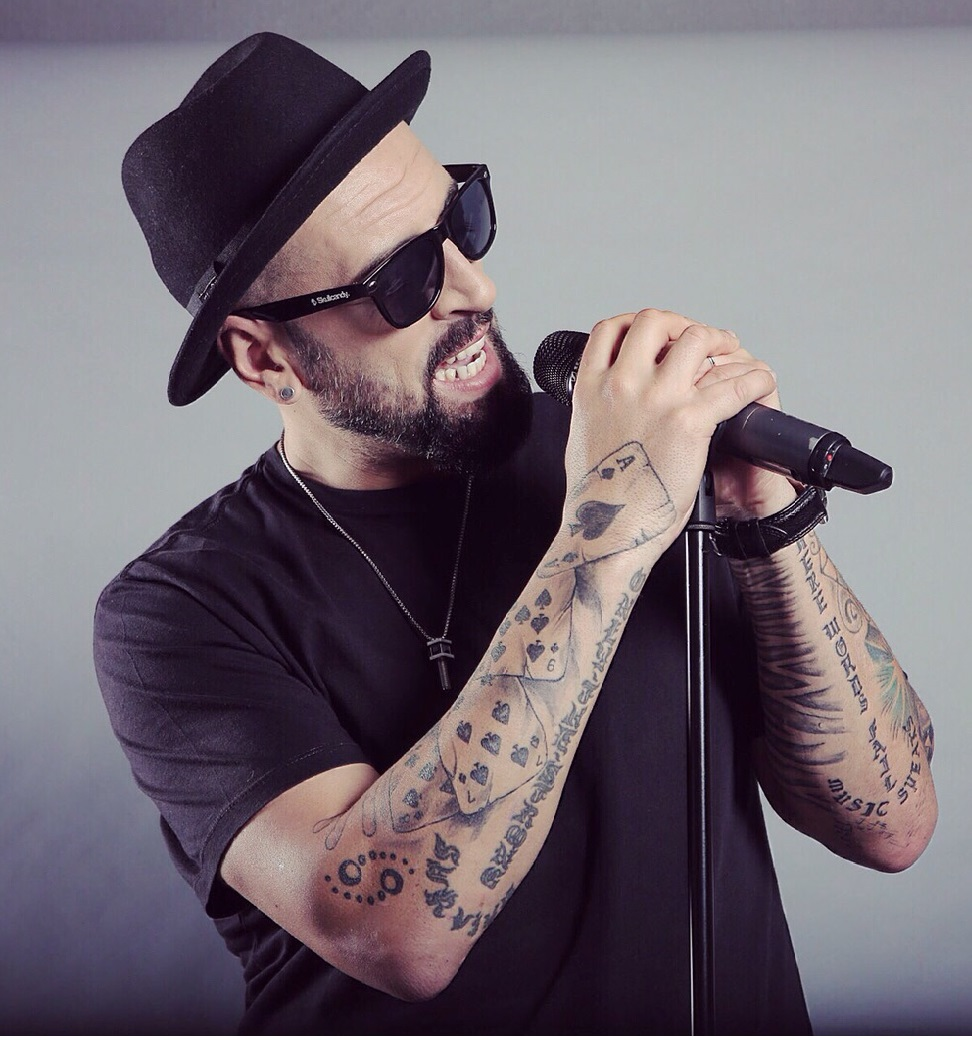
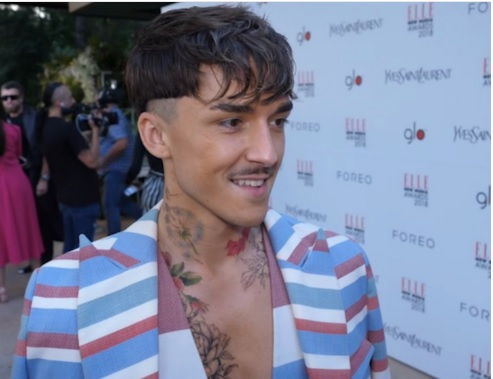
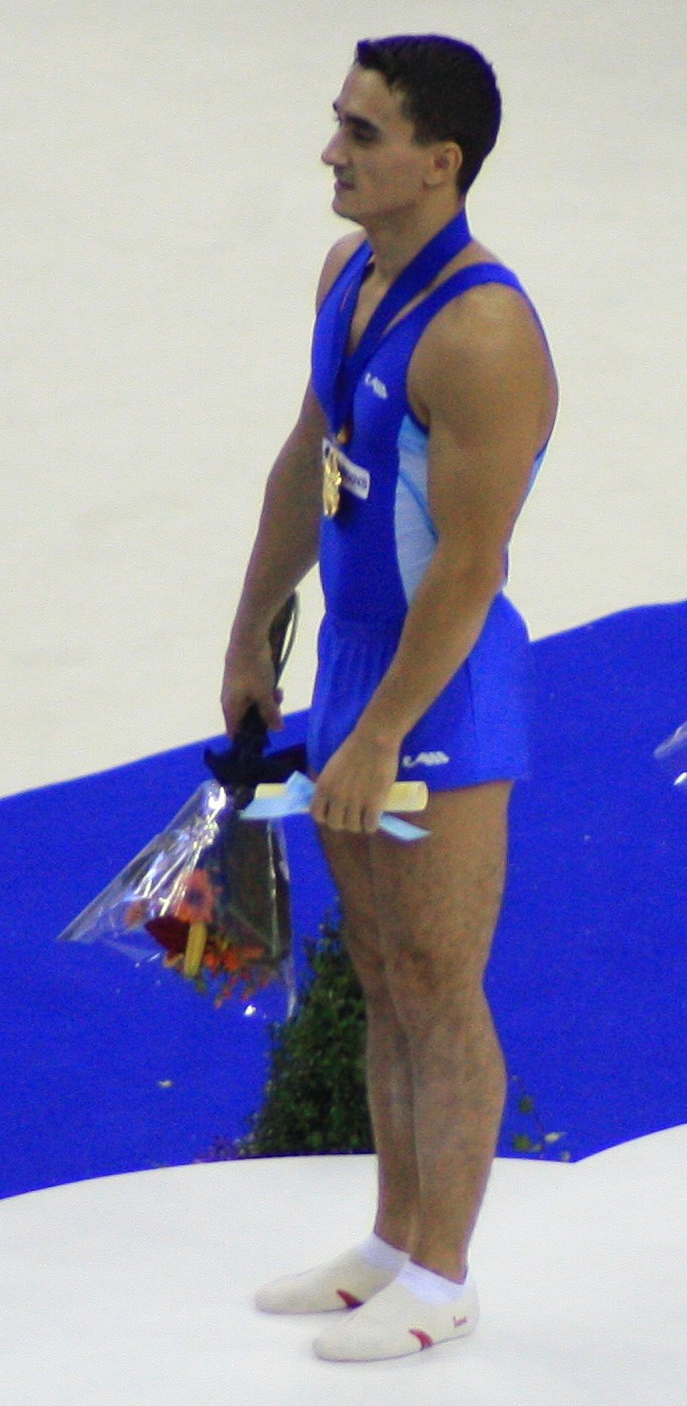
From left to right: Xonia, CRBL, Emil Rengle and Marian Drăgulescu.

The Faimoșii tribe was announced by Pro TV on December 13, 2021. Notable cast included former professional mixed martial artist, kickboxer and boxer Cătălin Zmărăndescu, former professional football player Robert Niță, Laura Giurcanu, the winner of Season 2 of Next Top Model and Emil Rengle the winner of Season 8 of Românii au talent. The Războinicii tribe was announced by Pro TV on January 10, 2022. Notable cast included Blaze, vlogger and finalist of Season 3 of Mireasa and Elena Matei, finalist of Season 9 of Chefi la Cuțite.

Six contestants were added later in the game in both tribes, including Marian Drăgulescu, multiple world champion and Olympic medalist in artistic gymnastics.

On Week 11, the sixteen remaining players merged but despite living on the same beach, tribes would still be split, competing against each other in challenges and fending for themselves, in a similar vein to the One World twist from the American version. On Week 13, fourteen of the fifteen remaining players were spread across two tribes of seven. The Războinicii and Faimoșii tribes were renamed Tigrii and Vulturii. Elena Chiriac and Ștefania Ștefan, the players with the best sports performances from the former tribes Faimoșii and Războinicii, determined the names and composition of the new tribes through consecutive selections. Due to medical intervention by production, CRBL did not attend tribe switch and later joined the tribe that lost the next Immunity Challenge: Vulturii.

The individual phase of the game occurred with 8 players left.

List of Survivor Romania 2022 contestants
Contestant	Age	From	Occupation	Tribe			Finish	
Contestant	Age	From	Occupation	Original	Switched	None	Placement	Day
Liviu Mihalca	22	Baia Mare, Maramureș	Professional folk dancer	Războinicii			Quit	Day 6
Loredana "Xonia" Sachelaru	32	Melbourne, Australia	Singer	Faimoșii			1st Voted Out	Day 6
Roxana Ciuhulescu	43	Sinaia, Prahova	TV presenter	Faimoșii			Medically evacuated	Day 10
Andreea Tonciu	35	Bucharest	Television and media personality	Faimoșii			2nd Voted Out	Day 13
Robert Niță	44	Bucharest	Retired football player	Faimoșii			3rd Voted Out	Day 19
Angela Forero Diaz	36	Bucharest	Veterinarian	Războinicii			Medically evacuated	Day 22
Ana Dobrovie	30	Târgu Jiu, Gorj	Dancer	Războinicii			4th Voted Out	Day 26
Radu Itu	29	Bucharest	Model and hat maker	Faimoșii			5th Voted Out	Day 32
Elena Matei	23	Ploiești, Prahova	Chef	Războinicii			6th Voted Out	Day 41
Otilia Brumă	29	Suceava, Suceava	Singer	Faimoșii			Medically evacuated	Day 43
Emil Rengle	31	Oradea, Bihor	Choreographer	Faimoșii			7th Voted Out	Day 48
Ramona Crăciunescu	35	Bucharest	Courier	Războinicii			8th Voted Out	Day 55
Natalia Duminică	31	Chișinău, Moldova	Belly dancer	Faimoșii			9th Voted Out	Day 63
Cătălin Zmărăndescu	49	Bucharest	Retired mixed martial artist	Faimoșii			10th Voted Out	Day 70
Laura Giurcanu	25	Bucharest	Model	Faimoșii			11th Voted Out	Day 84
Mihaela Stan	21	Bucharest	Swimming instructor	Războinicii	Vulturii		12th Voted Out	Day 89
Eduard "CRBL" Andreianu	43	Pitești, Argeș	Hip-hop singer	Faimoșii	Vulturii		Medically evacuated	Day 93
Relu Pănescu	50	Arad, Arad	Entrepreneur	Războinicii	Tigrii		13th Voted Out	Day 96
Alexandra Duli	24	London, United Kingdom	Manager	Războinicii	Vulturii		14th Voted Out	Day 105
Mari Fica	28	Târgu Jiu, Gorj	Athlete	Faimoșii	Tigrii		15th Voted Out	Day 110
Doru Răduță	31	Mioveni, Argeș	IT engineer	Războinicii	Vulturii		16th Voted Out	Day 117
Tiberiu "TJ Miles" Iordache	34	Constanța, Constanța	Business owner and influencer	Faimoșii	Tigrii		17th Voted Out	Day 122
Ștefania Ștefan	26	Lupeni, Hunedoara	Online streamer	Războinicii	Tigrii	None (Note: There was no official tribal designation at this point in the game)	18th Voted Out	Day 127
Marian Drăgulescu	41	Bucharest	Retired artistic gymnast	Faimoșii	Vulturii	None	19th Voted Out	Day 129
Oana Ciocan	24	Bacău, Bacău	Unnemployed	Războinicii	Tigrii	None	20th Voted Out	Day 131
Godspower "Blaze" Okpata	26	Bucharest	Vlogger	Războinicii	Vulturii	None	21st Voted Out	Day 138
Alexandru Nedelcu	36	Orșova, Mehedinți	Footballer	Războinicii	Tigrii	None	22nd Voted Out	Day 140
Ionuț Popa	33	Petrila, Hunedoara	Personal trainer	Războinicii	Tigrii	None	23rd Voted Out	Day 141
Elena Chiriac	20	Bucharest	Taekwondo champion	Faimoșii	Vulturii	None	Runner-up	Day 141
Alex Delea	26	Constanța, Constanța	Bartender	Războinicii	Vulturii	None	Sole Survivor	Day 141

=== Future appearances ===
Loredana "Xonia" Sachelaru, Roxana Ciuhulescu, Andreea Tonciu, Robert Niță, Elena Matei, Cătălin Zmărăndescu, Eduard "CRBL" Andreianu, Relu Pănescu, Alexandra Duli, Tiberiu "TJ Miles" Iordache, Ștefania Ștefan, Marian Drăgulescu, Oana Ciocan, Godspower "Blaze" Okpata, Alexandru Nedelcu, Ionuț Popa, Elena Chiriac and Alex Delea competed on Survivor România All Stars. Alex Delea, Elena Chiriac and Oana Ciocan returned on Season 4 to serve as a mentors alongside Edmond Zannidache.

== Season summary ==
Episodes air three days a week. First episode is dedicated to Reward Challenge and Mini games, the other one is dedicated to the Immunity Challenge, Tribal Council, along with the Individual Immunity Challenge for the losing tribe. The last episode of each week is dedicated to second Reward Challenge and Tribal Council that decides who gets eliminated.

Challenge winners and eliminations by cycle
Episode(s)		Challenge winner(s)			Exiled (vote)	Nominated (vote)	Eliminated (public vote)	Finish
No.	Original air date	Reward	Tribal immunity	Individual immunity	Exiled (vote)	Nominated (vote)	Eliminated (public vote)	Finish
1-3	January 16–18, 2022	Războinicii	Războinicii	Elena C., Emil		Roxana (5-3-1-1)	Liviu	Quit; Day 6
1-3	January 16–18, 2022	Războinicii	Războinicii	Elena C., Emil		Xonia, Cătălin (1-1-0)	Xonia	1st voted out Day 6
4-6	January 23–25, 2022	Faimoșii	Războinicii	Cătălin, ~~Roxana,~~; Laura (Note: Because Laura placed second in the immunity challenge, she received immunity after Roxana's evacuation.)		Andreea (6-2)	Roxana	Evacuated; Day 10
4-6	January 23–25, 2022	Războinicii (Note: Mini game)	Războinicii	Cătălin, ~~Roxana,~~; Laura		Andreea (6-2)	Roxana	Evacuated; Day 10
4-6	January 23–25, 2022	Războinicii	Războinicii	Cătălin, ~~Roxana,~~; Laura		Robert, Otilia (1-1-0)	Andreea	2nd voted out Day 13
7-9	January 30 — February 1, 2022	Faimoșii	Războinicii	Cătălin, Elena C. [Laura, Otilia] (Note: Due to the small number of girls in the Faimoșii tribe, Laura and Otilia were automatically immune.)		Robert (6-1)	Robert	3rd voted out Day 19
7-9	January 30 — February 1, 2022	Faimoșii	Războinicii	Cătălin, Elena C. [Laura, Otilia]		Robert (6-1)	Robert	3rd voted out Day 19
7-9	January 30 — February 1, 2022	Faimoșii	Războinicii	Cătălin, Elena C. [Laura, Otilia]		Radu, TJ Miles (1-1-0)	Robert	3rd voted out Day 19
10-12	February 6 — 8, 2022	Faimoșii	Faimoșii	Alexandra, Blaze		Ana (6-1-1)	Angela	Evacuated; Day 22
10-12	February 6 — 8, 2022	Războinicii	Faimoșii	Alexandra, Blaze		Relu, Ramona (1-1-0)	Ana	4th voted out Day 26
13-15	February 13 — 15, 2022	Războinicii	Războinicii	Laura, Emil [Marian, Natalia] (Note: As new castaways, Marian and Natalia were exempt from the nomination process.)		Radu (5-1)	Radu	5th voted out Day 32
13-15	February 13 — 15, 2022	Faimoșii	Războinicii	Laura, Emil [Marian, Natalia]		Radu (5-1)	Radu	5th voted out Day 32
13-15	February 13 — 15, 2022	Războinicii	Războinicii	Laura, Emil [Marian, Natalia]		Otilia, CRBL (1-1-0)	Radu	5th voted out Day 32
16-18	February 20–22, 2022	Faimoșii	Faimoșii	Ștefania, Blaze	CRBL	Doru (6-2-1)	Elena M.	6th voted out Day 41
16-18	February 20–22, 2022	Războinicii	Faimoșii	Ștefania, Blaze	Relu	Oana, Elena M. (1-1-0)	Elena M.	6th voted out Day 41
19-21	February 27–March 1, 2022	Războinicii	Războinicii	Elena C., Marian	Cătălin	Cătălin (4-1-1)	Otilia	Evacuated; Day 43
19-21	February 27–March 1, 2022	Războinicii	Războinicii	Elena C., Marian	Doru	Emil, CRBL (1-1-0)	Emil	7th voted out Day 48
22-24	March 6—8, 2022	Războinicii	Faimoșii	Oana, Doru	Marian	Relu (6-1-1)	Ramona	8th voted out Day 57
22-24	March 6—8, 2022	Războinicii	Faimoșii	Oana, Doru	Relu	Ramona, Blaze (1-1-0)	Ramona	8th voted out Day 57
25-27	March 13–15, 2022	Faimoșii	Războinicii	Elena C., Marian [Mari] (Note: As new castaways, Mari was exempt from the nomination process.)	CRBL	TJ Miles (3-2)	Natalia	9th voted out Day 63
25-27	March 13–15, 2022	Războinicii	Războinicii	Elena C., Marian [Mari]	Doru	Natalia, CRBL (1-1-0)	Natalia	9th voted out Day 63
28-30	March 20–22, 2022	Războinicii	Războinicii	Elena C., Marian	TJ Miles	TJ Miles (4-1)	Cătălin	10th voted out Day 70
28-30	March 20–22, 2022	Faimoșii	Războinicii	Elena C., Marian	Relu	Mari, Cătălin (1-1-0)	Cătălin	10th voted out Day 70
31-33	March 20–22, 2022	Faimoșii	No exile, immunity challenge or elimination on cycle 11 due to the merge.					
31-33	March 20–22, 2022	Războinicii	No exile, immunity challenge or elimination on cycle 11 due to the merge.					
31-33	March 20–22, 2022	Faimoșii	No exile, immunity challenge or elimination on cycle 11 due to the merge.					
31-33	March 20–22, 2022	Survivor; România	No exile, immunity challenge or elimination on cycle 11 due to the merge.					
34-36	April 3–5, 2022	Războinicii	Războinicii	Elena C., Marian	None (Note: There was no exile since merge.)	Laura (2-1-1)	Laura	11th voted out Day 84
34-36	April 3–5, 2022	Războinicii	Războinicii	Elena C., Marian	None	Laura (2-1-1)	Laura	11th voted out Day 84
34-36	April 3–5, 2022	Războinicii	Războinicii	Elena C., Marian	None	TJ Miles, CRBL (1-1-0)	Laura	11th voted out Day 84
37-39	April 10–12, 2022	Faimoșii	Tigrii	Elena C., Blaze	None	Mihaela (3-1-1)	Mihaela	12th voted out Day 89
37-39	April 10–12, 2022	Tigrii	Tigrii	Elena C., Blaze	None	Mihaela (3-1-1)	Mihaela	12th voted out Day 89
37-39	April 10–12, 2022	Tigrii	Tigrii	Elena C., Blaze	None	Doru, Alexandra (1-1-0)	Mihaela	12th voted out Day 89
40-42	April 17–19, 2022	Vulturii	Vulturii	Alexandru, Oana	None	Relu (4-1)	CRBL	Evacuated; Day 93
40-42	April 17–19, 2022	Vulturii	Vulturii	Alexandru, Oana	None	Mari, TJ Miles (1-1-0)	Relu	13th voted out Day 96
43-45	April 24–25, 2022	Tigrii	Tigrii	Alex, Doru	None	Elena C. (2-1-1)	Alexandra	14th voted out Day 105
43-45	April 24–25, 2022	Vulturii	Tigrii	Alex, Doru	None	Alexandra, Marian (1-1-0)	Alexandra	14th voted out Day 105
46-48	May 1–3, 2022	Vulturii	Vulturii	Ionuț, Alexandru	None	TJ Miles (3-1)	Mari	15th voted out Day 110
46-48	May 1–3, 2022	Vulturii	Vulturii	Ionuț, Alexandru	None	Mari, Oana (1-1-0)	Mari	15th voted out Day 110
49-51	May 8–10, 2022	Tigrii	Tigrii	Alex, [Elena C.]	None	Doru, Marian (2-2)	Doru	16th voted out Day 117
49-51	May 8–10, 2022	Vulturii	Tigrii	Alex, [Elena C.]	None	Doru, Marian (2-2)	Doru	16th voted out Day 117
49-51	May 8–10, 2022	Vulturii	Tigrii	Alex, [Elena C.]	None	Blaze (1-0)	Doru	16th voted out Day 117
52-54	May 15–17, 2022	Tigrii	Vulturii	Ionuț	None	TJ Miles (3-1)	TJ Miles	17th voted out Day 122
52-54	May 15–17, 2022	Tigrii	Vulturii	Ionuț	None	Alexandru (1-0)	TJ Miles	17th voted out Day 122
55-57	May 22–24, 2022	Marian [Elena C., Ștefania] (Note: Combined reward and immunity challenge.)	None	Marian	None	Ștefania, Elena C. (3-3-1)	Ștefania	18th voted out Day 127
55-57	May 22–24, 2022	Marian [Elena C., Ștefania]	None	Marian	None	Ionuț (1-0)	Ștefania	18th voted out Day 127
55-57	May 22–24, 2022	None	None	Elena C.	None	Marian (5-1)	Marian	19th voted out Day 129
55-57	May 22–24, 2022	None	None	Elena C.	None	Ionuț (1-0)	Marian	19th voted out Day 129
55-57	May 22–24, 2022	Ionuț [Alex, Alexandru]	None	Ionuț	None	Alex, Elena C. (3-3-1)	Oana	20th voted out Day 131
55-57	May 22–24, 2022	Ionuț [Alex, Alexandru]	None	Ionuț	None	Oana (1-0)	Oana	20th voted out Day 131
58-60	May 29–31, 2022	Alex [Alexandru, Ionuț]	None	Alex	None	Alexandru, Blaze, Elena C., Ionuț (1-1-1-1-0)	Blaze	21st voted out Day 138
58-60	May 29–31, 2022	None	None	Alex	None	Alexandru, Elena C., Ionuț (No vote) (Note: No vote; Since Alexandru, Elena C. and Ionuț were the only castaways without immunity, they were nominated by default.)	Alexandru	22nd voted out Day 140
58-60	May 29–31, 2022	None	None	Alex	None	Elena C., Ionuț (No vote) (Note: No vote; Since Elena C. and Ionuț were the only castaways without immunity, they were nominated by default.)	Ionuț	23rd voted out Day 141
58-60	May 29–31, 2022	Public vote					Public vote	
58-60	May 29–31, 2022	Public vote					Elena C.	Runner-up
58-60	May 29–31, 2022	Public vote					Alex	Sole Survivor

== Voting history ==
	Original tribes																																					Switched tribes																			No tribes																
Week #	1				2				3			4				5			6			7				8			9			10			12			13			14				15			16			17			18			19									20							
Episode #	2		3		5			6	8		9	10	11		12	14		15	17		18	19	20		21	23		24	26		27	29		30	35		36	38		39	41			42	44		45	47		48	50		51	53		54	55			56			57			58		59		60			
Voted Out	Nomination vote		Liviu	Xonia	Roxana	Nomination vote		Andreea	Nomination vote		Robert	Angela	Nomination vote		Ana	Nomination vote		Radu	Nomination vote		Elena M.	Otilia	Nomination vote		Emil	Nomination vote		Ramona	Nomination vote		Natalia	Nomination vote		Cătălin	Nomination vote		Laura	Nomination vote		Mihaela	CRBL	Nomination vote		Relu	Nomination vote		Alexandra	Nomination vote		Mari	Nomination vote		Doru	Nomination vote		TJ Miles	Nomination vote		Ștefania	Nomination vote		Marian	Nomination vote		Oana	Nomination vote	Blaze	Nomination vote	Alexandru	Nomination vote	Ionuț	Elena C.	Alex
Nominated	Roxana	Cătălin & Xonia				Andreea	Robert & Otilia		Robert	Radu & TJ Miles			Ana	Ramona & Relu		Radu	Otilia & CRBL		Doru	Oana & Elena M.			Cătălin	Emil & CRBL		Relu	Ramona & Blaze		TJ Miles	Natalia & CRBL		TJ Miles	Mari & Cătălin		Laura	TJ Miles & CRBL		Mihaela	Doru & Alexandra			Relu	Mari & TJ Miles		Elena C.	Alexandra & Marian		TJ Miles	Mari & Oana		Doru & Marian	Blaze		TJ Miles	Alexandru		Elena C. & Ștefania	Ionuț		Marian	Ionuț		Alex & Elena C.	Oana		Alexandru, Blaze, Elena C. & Ionuț		Alexandru, Elena C. & Ionuț		Elena C. & Ionuț			
Votes	5-3-1-1	1-1-0 (Note: The winner(s) of the Individual Immunity had to directly nominate a member of the tribe.)	No vote (Note: No vote; Before the second Reward challenge, Liviu elected to quit the game. No vote occurred for his removal.)	Public vote	No vote (Note: No vote; Roxana was medically evacuated. No vote occurred for her removal.)	6-2	1-1-0	Public vote	6-1	1-1-0	Public vote	No vote (Note: No vote; Angela was medically evacuated. No vote occurred for her removal.)	6-1-1	1-1-0	Public vote	5-1	1-1-0	Public vote	6-2-1	1-1-0	Public vote	No vote (Note: No vote; Otilia was medically evacuated. No vote occurred for her removal.)	4-1-1	1-1-0	Public vote	6-1-1	1-1-0	Public vote	3-2	1-1-0	Public vote	4-1	1-1-0	Public vote	2-1-1	1-1-0	Public vote	3-1-1	1-1-0	Public vote	No vote (Note: No vote; CRBL was medically evacuated. No vote occurred for his removal.)	4-1	1-1-0	Public vote	2-1-1	1-1-0	Public vote	3-1	1-1-0	Public vote	2-2	1-0	Public vote	3-1	1-0	Public vote	3-3-1	1-0	Public vote	5-1	1-0	Public vote	2-2-1	1-0	Public vote	1-1-1-1-0	Public vote	No vote (Note: No vote; Since Alexandru, Elena C. and Ionuț were the only castaways without immunity, they were nominated by default.)	Public vote	No vote (Note: No vote; Since Elena C. and Ionuț were the only castaways without immunity, they were nominated by default.)	Public vote	Public vote	
Voter	Vote																																																																								
Alex	—		—	—	—	—			—			—	Ana	—N/a	—	—			Doru	—N/a	—	—	—			Relu	—N/a	—	—			—			—			Mihaela	—N/a	—	—	—			—N/a	Alexandra	—	—			—N/a	Blaze	—	—			Elena C.	—N/a	—	Marian	—N/a	—	Elena C.	—N/a	Saved	—N/a	—	Immune		Immune		Sole Survivor	
Elena C.	—N/a	Xonia	—	—	—	Andreea	—N/a	—	—N/a	TJ Miles	—	—	—			Radu	—N/a	—	—			—	—N/a	Emil	—	—			—N/a	Natalia	—	—N/a	Mari	—	—N/a	TJ Miles	—	—N/a	Doru	—	—	—			Alexandra	Nominated	Saved	—			Doru	—N/a	—	—			Ionuț	Nominated	Saved	—N/a	Ionuț	—	Alex	—N/a	Saved	Ionuț	Saved	Nominated	Saved	Nominated	Saved	Runner-up	
Ionuț	—		—	—	—	—			—			—	Ana	—N/a	—	—			Doru	—N/a	—	—	—			Relu	—N/a	—	—			—			—			—			—	Relu	—N/a	—	—			—N/a	Mari	—	—			—N/a	Alexandru	—	Ștefania	—N/a	Saved	Marian	—N/a	Saved	—N/a	Oana	—	Elena C.	Saved	Nominated	Saved	Nominated	Voted out		
Alexandru	—		—	—	—	—			—			—	Ana	—N/a	—	—			Doru	—N/a	—	—	—			Relu	—N/a	—	—			—			—			—			—	—N/a	TJ Miles	—	—			—N/a	Oana	—	—			TJ Miles	—N/a	Saved	Elena C.	—N/a	—	Marian	—N/a	—	Elena C.	—N/a	—	Blaze	Saved	Nominated	Voted out				
Blaze	—		—	—	—	—			—			—	—N/a	Relu	—	—			—N/a	Elena M.	—	—	—			Relu	—N/a	Saved	—			—			—			—N/a	Alexandra	—	—	—			Elena C.	—	—N/a	—			Marian	—N/a	Saved	—			Ștefania	—N/a	—	Marian	—N/a	—	Alexandru	—N/a	—	Alexandru	Voted out						
Oana	Not in Game															Exempt (Note: Exempt; As new castaways, Doru, Marian, Natalia and Oana were exempt from the nomination process)			Elena M.	—N/a	Saved	—	—			—N/a	Ramona	—	—			—			—			—			—	—N/a	Mari	—	—			TJ Miles	—N/a	Saved	—			TJ Miles	—N/a	—	Ștefania	—N/a	—	Marian	—N/a	—	Alex	—N/a	Voted out								
Marian	Not in Game															Exempt			—			—	—N/a	CRBL	—	—			—N/a	CRBL	—	—N/a	Cătălin	—	—N/a	CRBL	—	Mihaela	—N/a	—	—	—			Blaze	—N/a	Saved	—			Doru	Nominated	Saved	—			—N/a	Ionuț	—	Blaze	Nominated	Voted out											
Ștefania	—		—	—	—	—			—			—	Ana	—N/a	—	—			—N/a	Oana	—	—	—			Relu	—N/a	—	—			—			—			—			—	Relu	—N/a	—	—			TJ Miles	—N/a	—	—			TJ Miles	—N/a	—	Elena C.	Nominated	Voted out														
TJ Miles	Roxana	—N/a	—	—	—	Andreea	—N/a	—	Robert	—N/a	Saved	—	—			Radu	—N/a	—	—			—	Cătălin	—N/a	—	—			CRBL	Nominated	Saved	CRBL	Nominated	Saved	Laura	—N/a	Saved	—			—	Relu	—N/a	—	—			Ștefania	Nominated	Saved	—			Alexandru	—N/a	Voted out																	
Doru	Not in Game															Exempt			Ionuț	Nominated	Saved	—	—			—N/a	Blaze	—	—			—			—			Mihaela	—N/a	Saved	—	—			—N/a	Marian	—	—			Marian	Nominated	Voted out																				
Mari	Not in Game																												Exempt (Note: Exempt; As new castaways, Mari and Mihaela were exempt from the nomination process)			TJ Miles	—N/a	Saved	Laura	—N/a	—	—			—	Relu	—N/a	Saved	—			TJ Miles	—N/a	Voted out																							
Alexandra	—		—	—	—	—			—			—	—N/a	Ramona	—	—			Doru	—N/a	—	—	—			Relu	—N/a	—	—			—			—			Doru	—N/a	Saved	—	—			Elena C.	—N/a	Voted out																										
Relu	—		—	—	—	—			—			—	Ana	—N/a	Saved	—			Ionuț	—N/a	—	—	—			Ionuț	Nominated	Saved	—			—			—			—			—	Mari	Nominated	Voted out																													
CRBL	Roxana	—N/a	—	—	—	Andreea	—N/a	—	Robert	—N/a	—	—	—			Radu	—N/a	Saved	—			—	TJ Miles	—N/a	Saved	—			TJ Miles	—N/a	Saved	TJ Miles	—N/a	—	TJ Miles	—N/a	Saved	Sick Day (Note: Sick Day; Due to medical intervention by production, CRBL did not attend Tribal Council but not be deemed unable to continue with the game. As he could not attend Tribal Council, he could not vote, nor be voted out.)			Evacuated																																
Mihaela	Not in Game																												Exempt			—			—			Alexandra	Nominated	Voted out																																	
Laura	CRBL	—N/a	—	—	—	—N/a	Otilia	—	Robert	—N/a	—	—	—			—N/a	Otilia	—	—			—	Cătălin	—N/a	—	—			TJ Miles	—N/a	—	TJ Miles	—N/a	—	Mari	Nominated	Voted out																																				
Cătălin	Roxana	—N/a	—	Saved	—	—N/a	Robert	—	—N/a	Radu	—	—	—			Radu	—N/a	—	—			—	Emil	Nominated	Saved	—			CRBL	—N/a	—	TJ Miles	—N/a	Voted out																																							
Natalia	Not in Game															Exempt			—			—	Cătălin	—N/a	—	—			TJ Miles	—N/a	Voted out																																										
Ramona	—		—	—	—	—			—			—	Ana	—N/a	Saved	—			Doru	—N/a	—	—	—			Blaze	—N/a	Voted out																																													
Emil	—N/a	Cătălin	—	—	—	Andreea	—N/a	—	Robert	—N/a	—	—	—			—N/a	CRBL	—	—			—	Cătălin	—N/a	Voted out																																																
Otilia	CRBL	—N/a	—	—	—	Robert	—N/a	Saved	Robert	—N/a	—	—	—			Radu	—N/a	Saved	—			Evacuated																																																			
Elena M.	—		—	—	—	—			—			—	Ramona	—N/a	—	—			Doru	—N/a	Voted out																																																				
Radu	Roxana	—N/a	—	—	—	Andreea	—N/a	—	Robert	—N/a	Saved	—	—			CRBL	Nominated	Voted out																																																							
Ana	—		—	—	—	—			—			—	Relu	Nominated	Voted out																																																										
Angela	—		—	—	—	—			—			Evacuated																																																													
Robert	Xonia	—N/a	—	—	—	Andreea	—N/a	Saved	TJ Miles	Nominated	Voted out																																																														
Andreea	CRBL	—N/a	—	—	—	Robert	Nominated	Voted Out																																																																	
Roxana	Cătălin	Nominated		Saved	Evacuated																																																																				
Xonia	Roxana	—N/a	—	Voted Out																																																																					
Liviu	—		Quit																																																																						
