= Survivor România 2023 =

- Season 4
- Presented by: Daniel Pavel
- No. of days: 135
- No. of castaways: 30
- Winner: Dan Ursa
- Runner-up: Andrei Krișan
- Location: La Romana, Dominican Republic
- No. of episodes: 61

Release
- Original network: Pro TV
- Original release: 9 January – 24 May 2023

Additional information
- Filming dates: 4 January – 24 May 2023

Season chronology
- ← Previous; 2022 Next → All Stars

Survivor România 2023 is the fourth season of the Pro TV incarnation of the competitive reality TV show Survivor România. As with the previous seasons, the season features 30 contestants divided into two tribes: "Faimoșii", composed of twelve high-achievers who excelled in their fields, and "Războinicii", composed of twelve everyday Romanians and was filmed in La Romana, Dominican Republic from January to May 2023.

The season premiered on 9 January 2023 and concluded on 24 May 2023. The winner was 40-year-old Dan Ursa, a regional sales manager from Tășnad, Satu Mare. He defeated Andrei Krișan at the live finale and take the grand prize of €100.000 and title of Sole Survivor.

== Production ==
=== Development ===
Like previous seasons, this fourth season is produced by Acun Media Global. The season was first announced on September 29, 2022. A press release for the show's renewal confirmed that Daniel Pavel would return as a host. Casting began also on September 29, 2022. Online applications opened upon the start of casting and closed in November 2022. On December 23, 2022, it was announced that the season would premiere on January 9, 2023.

=== Wildcard ===
The first member of Războinicii tribe was chosen by a public vote. On 10 October, it was announced that the public would decide the first castaway of the series through a competition. The casting was open from 10 to 24 October. Following the casting eight finalists were selected, four women and four men. Each week, the eight had to compete in various elimination challenges. The public ultimately decided who would be the first member of the Războinicii tribe

=== Mentors ===
In week 12, right before the merge, former Survivor winners Edmond Zannidache and Alex Delea alongside Elena Chiriac and Oana Ciocan returned as mentors to the castaways. Neither mentor was in contention to win prize.

=== Medallion of Power and Kidnapping ===
The Medallion of Power will be hidden at both camps. Both medallions are usable until week 11. Alexandra P. found the medallion from the Războinicii tribe, and Carmen from the Faimoșii tribe. In weeks 10 and 11 the tribe who wins the first Reward Challenge of the week was given the right to kidnap one member from the rival tribe. Their chosen victim was forced to compete with them until the last Reward Challenge of the week. At the end of the week, the holder of the Medallion decided whether the contestant returned to their original tribe or stayed with the kidnapped tribe. Both Remus and Alin returned to their original tribe.

== Contestants ==
Andreea Moromete was chosen by fans. The Faimoșii tribe was announced by Pro TV on December 15, 2022. Notable cast included kickboxing champion, Ionuț Iftimoaie, former elite gymnast Ștefania Stănilă and Silicon Valley's youngest self-made millionaire, Sebastian Dobrincu. The Războinicii tribe was announced by Pro TV on January 2, 2023.

Six contestants were added later in the game in both tribes. On Week 12, the thirteen remaining players merged into one tribe, named Taíno, the name of the Amerindians who were the first inhabitants of the Dominican Republic.

List of Survivor Romania 2023 contestants
Contestant	Age	From	Occupation	Tribe		Finish	
Contestant	Age	From	Occupation	Original	Merged	Placement	Day
Maria Constantin	35	Bălcești, Vâlcea	Traditional folk singer	Faimoșii		1st Voted Out	Day 7
Gabriel "Gheboasă" Gavriș	21	Târgoviște, Dâmbovița	Trapper	Faimoșii		Quit	Day 7
Daria Chiper	21	Bucharest	Basketball player	Războinicii		Eliminated	Day 10
Sebastian Dobrincu	24	Bucharest	Tech entrepreneur	Faimoșii		Medically evacuated	Day 14
Maria Lungu	28	Chișinău, Moldova	Fashion designer	Războinicii		2nd Voted Out	Day 14
Răzvan Danciu	20	Gălăuțaș-Pârău, Harghita	Student	Războinicii		3rd Voted Out	Day 20
George "Jorge" Papagheorghe	40	Constanța, Constanța	Singer and TV host	Faimoșii		Medically evacuated	Day 27
Vica Blochina	47	Bucharest	Television and media personality	Faimoșii		4th Voted Out	Day 27
Andrei Neagu	26	Constanța, Constanța	Actor	Războinicii		5th Voted Out	Day 34
Codruța Began	47	Cluj-Napoca, Cluj	Physical education and sports teacher	Războinicii		6th Voted Out	Day 42
Eduard Gogulescu	23	Bucharest	DJ	Războinicii		7th Voted Out	Day 49
Alina Radi	34	Timișoara, Timiș	Event singer	Războinicii		8th Voted Out	Day 56
Crina Abrudan	45	Oradea, Bihor	News anchor	Faimoșii		9th Voted Out	Day 64
Vlad "DOC" Munteanu	42	Bucharest	Rapper	Faimoșii		10th Voted Out	Day 71
Lucianna Vagneti	37	Ploiești, Prahova	Personal trainer	Războinicii		11th Voted Out	Day 79
Ada Dumitru	28	Bucharest	Film and stage actress	Faimoșii		Medically evacuated	Day 82
Mihai Zmărăndescu	23	Bucharest	Amateur MMA fighter	Faimoșii		12th Voted Out	Day 82
Remus Boroiu	36	Băicoi, Prahova	Body transformation specialist	Faimoșii	Taíno	13th Voted Out	Day 90
Kamara Ghedi	47	Bucharest	Singer	Faimoșii	Taíno	14th Voted Out	Day 97
Ionuț Iftimoaie	44	Comănești, Bacău	Kickboxing champion	Faimoșii	Taíno	Quit	Day 100
Alin Chirilă	34	Galați, Galați	Professional MMA fighter	Războinicii	Taíno	15th Voted Out	Day 106
Bianca Patrichi	33	Bucharest	Choreographer	Faimoșii	Taíno	16th Voted Out	Day 111
Robert Moscalu	25	Murfatlar, Constanța	Bartender	Războinicii	Taíno	17th Voted Out	Day 118
Andreea Moromete	23	Alexandria, Teleorman	User generated content creator	Războinicii	Taíno	18th Voted Out	Day 123
Ștefania Stănilă	25	Aninoasa, Hunedoara	Gymnastics champion and gymnastics coach	Faimoșii	Taíno	19th Voted Out	Day 128
Alexandra Porkoláb	32	Brașov, Brașov	Marketing and sales manager	Războinicii	Taíno	20th Voted Out	Day 133
Alexandra Ciomag	20	Bucharest	Model	Războinicii	Taíno	21st Voted Out	Day 134
Carmen Grebenișan	30	Cluj-Napoca, Cluj	Digital creator	Faimoșii	Taíno	22nd Voted Out	Day 135
Andrei Krișan	30	Cluj-Napoca, Cluj	Personal trainer	Războinicii	Taíno	Runner-up	Day 135
Dan Ursa	40	Tășnad, Satu Mare	Regional sales manager	Războinicii	Taíno	Sole Survivor	Day 135

=== Future appearances ===
Gabriel "Gheboasă" Gavriș, Sebastian Dobrincu, Maria Lungu, George "Jorge" Papagheorghe, Codruța Began, Vlad "DOC" Munteanu, Ada Dumitru, Mihai Zmărăndescu, Remus Boroiu, Kamara Ghedi, Ionuț Iftimoaie, Alin Chirilă, Robert Moscalu, Andreea Moromete, Ștefania Stănilă, Alexandra Porkoláb, Alexandra Ciomag, Carmen Grebenișan, Andrei Krișan and Dan Ursa competed on Survivor România All Stars.

== Season summary ==
=== Nomination mechanism ===
The tribe(s) attend Tribal Council to nominate a certain number of players.

- Cycle 1 - Cycle 4: There was only one Tribal Immunity Challenge, the losing tribe would have three nominees, one by vote and two chosen by the Individual Immunity winners.
- Cycle 5: Two Tribal Immunity Challenges are performed, after each challenge the losing tribe must attend Tribal Council and nominate one of its members by vote. If the same tribe loses both challenges, the Immunity Necklace winners would nominate another member, for a total of three nominees.

Challenge winners and eliminations by cycle
Episode(s)		Challenge winner(s)			Exiled (vote)	Kidnapped	Nominated (vote)	Eliminated (public vote)	Finish
No.	Original air date	Reward	Tribal immunity	Individual immunity	Exiled (vote)	Kidnapped	Nominated (vote)	Eliminated (public vote)	Finish
1–3	January 9–11, 2023	Războinicii	Războinicii	Ionuț, Ștefania	Jorge (Consensus)		Gheboasă (9-1)	Maria C.	1st voted out Day 7
1–3	January 9–11, 2023	Faimoșii	Războinicii	Ionuț, Ștefania	Răzvan (Consensus)		DOC, Maria C. (1–1–0)	Gheboasă	Quit; Day 7
4–7	January 15–18, 2023	Faimoșii	Faimoșii	Alexandra P., Andrei K.	Ionuț (7–2) (Note: No vote; Ionuț was voted out verbally by the Faimoșii tribe. Due to the nature of the verbal vote, Ionuț did not cast a vote.)		Daria (1–0)	Daria	Eliminated; Day 10
4–7	January 15–18, 2023	Faimoșii	Faimoșii	Alexandra P., Andrei K.	Andreea (9–1–1–1)		Maria L. (9–1)	Sebastian	Evacuated; Day 14
4–7	January 15–18, 2023	Războinicii	Faimoșii	Alexandra P., Andrei K.	Alexandra C., Kamara (No vote) (Note: Alexandra C. and Kamara starting the game in Day 7 on exile island apart from the two tribes. In order to enter the main game, they must compete in one entry challenge along with Ionuț and Andreea who were sent on exile by their tribe, where the three winners earn a spot in the main game. The loser of the challenge returned on exile.)		Codruța, Andrei N. (1–1–0)	Maria L.	2nd voted out Day 14
8–10	January 23–25, 2023	Faimoșii	Faimoșii	Alexandra P., Alin	None (Note: There was no exile.)		Andrei N. (8–1)	Răzvan	3rd voted out Day 20
8–10	January 23–25, 2023	Faimoșii (Note: Mini game)	Faimoșii	Alexandra P., Alin	None		Andrei N. (8–1)	Răzvan	3rd voted out Day 20
8–10	January 23–25, 2023	Războinicii	Faimoșii	Alexandra P., Alin	None		Codruța, Răzvan (1–1–0)	Răzvan	3rd voted out Day 20
11–13	January 30 – February 1, 2023	Faimoșii	Războinicii	Bianca, Kamara	None		Vica (6–1)	Jorge	Evacuated; Day 27
11–13	January 30 – February 1, 2023	Faimoșii	Războinicii	Bianca, Kamara	None		Vica (6–1)	Jorge	Evacuated; Day 27
11–13	January 30 – February 1, 2023	Războinicii	Războinicii	Bianca, Kamara	None		DOC, Ada (1–1–0)	Vica	4th voted out Day 27
14–16	February 6–8, 2023	Războinicii (Note: Combined reward and immunity challenge.)		Ada, DOC	None		Bianca, Remus (3–3)	Andrei N.	5th voted out Day 34
14–16	February 6–8, 2023	Războinicii		Ada, DOC	None		Kamara, Carmen (1–1–0)	Andrei N.	5th voted out Day 34
14–16	February 6–8, 2023	Faimoșii	Faimoșii	Andreea, Andrei K.	None		Codruța (8–1)	Andrei N.	5th voted out Day 34
14–16	February 6–8, 2023	Faimoșii	Faimoșii	Andreea, Andrei K.	None		Andrei N. Alexandra C. (1–1–0)	Andrei N.	5th voted out Day 34
17–19	February 13–15, 2023	Faimoșii		Lucianna, Andrei K. [Alina, Eduard] (Note: As new castaways, Alina and Eduard were exempt from the nomination process.)	None		Alexandra P. (5–1–1)	Codruța	6th voted out Day 42
17–19	February 13–15, 2023	Faimoșii		Lucianna, Andrei K. [Alina, Eduard]	None		Alexandra C., Codruța (1–1–0)	Codruța	6th voted out Day 42
17–19	February 13–15, 2023	Războinicii	Războinicii	Carmen, Remus [Crina, Mihai] (Note: As new castaways, Crina and Mihai were exempt from the nomination process.)	None		Ada (3–2–1)	Codruța	6th voted out Day 42
17–19	February 13–15, 2023	Războinicii	Războinicii	Carmen, Remus [Crina, Mihai]	None		Kamara, Bianca (1–1–0)	Codruța	6th voted out Day 42
20–22	February 20–22, 2023	Faimoșii		Lucianna, Alin	None		Robert (5–3)	Eduard	7th voted out Day 49
20–22	February 20–22, 2023	Faimoșii		Lucianna, Alin	None		Alexandra C., Eduard (1–1–0)	Eduard	7th voted out Day 49
20–22	February 20–22, 2023	Războinicii	Războinicii	Ada, Remus	None		Ionuț (4–2–1–1)	Eduard	7th voted out Day 49
20–22	February 20–22, 2023	Războinicii	Războinicii	Ada, Remus	None		DOC, Kamara (1–1–0)	Eduard	7th voted out Day 49
23–25	February 27 – March 1, 2023	Faimoșii		Andreea, Alin	None		Alina (6–1)	Alina	8th voted out Day 56
23–25	February 27 – March 1, 2023	Războinicii	Faimoșii	Andreea, Alin	None		Alexandra C., Alexandra P. (1–1–0)	Alina	8th voted out Day 56
23–25	February 27 – March 1, 2023	Războinicii	Faimoșii	Andreea, Alin	None		Lucianna (5–2)	Alina	8th voted out Day 56
26–28	March 6–8, 2023	Faimoșii	Războinicii	Ștefania, Ionuț	None		Crina (5–3)	Crina	9th voted out Day 64
26–28	March 6–8, 2023	Războinicii	Războinicii	Ștefania, Ionuț	None		DOC, Ada (1–1–0)	Crina	9th voted out Day 64
26–28	March 6–8, 2023	[Ștefania, Ionuț] (Note: The Războinicii tribe were told to invite two castaways from the Faimoșii tribe on their reward; they chose Ștefania and Ionuț.)	Războinicii	Ștefania, Ionuț	None		DOC, Ada (1–1–0)	Crina	9th voted out Day 64
26–28	March 6–8, 2023	Războinicii	Războinicii	Ștefania, Ionuț	None		Carmen (4–3–1)	Crina	9th voted out Day 64
29–31	March 13–15, 2023	Războinicii	Războinicii	Ștefania, Mihai	None	Remus	Ionuț (4–3)	DOC	10th voted out Day 71
29–31	March 13–15, 2023	Războinicii	Războinicii	Ștefania, Mihai	None	Remus	DOC, Ada (1–1–0)	DOC	10th voted out Day 71
29–31	March 13–15, 2023	Survivor; Auction	Războinicii	Ștefania, Mihai	None	Remus	Ionuț (4–2–1–1)	DOC	10th voted out Day 71
29–31	March 13–15, 2023	Războinicii	Faimoșii	Andreea, Dan	None	Remus	Alin (3–2–1)	DOC	10th voted out Day 71
29–31	March 13–15, 2023	Războinicii	Faimoșii	Andreea, Dan	None	Remus	Lucianna, Robert (1–1–0)	DOC	10th voted out Day 71
32–34	March 20–22, 2023	Faimoșii	Războinicii	Bianca, Remus	None	Alin	Kamara, Ada (3–3)	Lucianna	11th voted out Day 79
32–34	March 20–22, 2023	Faimoșii	Războinicii	Bianca, Remus	None	Alin	Ionuț, Mihai (1–1–0)	Lucianna	11th voted out Day 79
32–34	March 20–22, 2023	Faimoșii	Faimoșii	Andreea, Dan	None	Alin	Lucianna (4–1)	Lucianna	11th voted out Day 79
32–34	March 20–22, 2023	Războinicii	Faimoșii	Andreea, Dan	None	Alin	Andrei K., Robert (1–1–0)	Lucianna	11th voted out Day 79
35–37	March 27–29, 2023	Războinicii	Războinicii	Ionuț, Ștefania	None	None	Carmen (3–1–1)	Ada	Evacuated; Day 82
35–37	March 27–29, 2023	Războinicii	Războinicii	Ionuț, Ștefania	None	None	Carmen (3–1–1)	Ada	Evacuated; Day 82
35–37	March 27–29, 2023	Faimoșii	Războinicii	Ionuț, Ștefania	None	None	Carmen (3–1–1)	Ada	Evacuated; Day 82
35–37	March 27–29, 2023	Alexandra C., Alin, Remus, Ștefania [Alexandra P., Andreea, Bianca, Carmen]	Războinicii	Ionuț, Ștefania	None	None	Remus, Mihai (1–1–0)	Mihai	12th voted out Day 82
38–40	April 2–4, 2023	Kamara, Ștefania (Note: Capitan's challenge)	None	Dan	None	None	Carmen (8–5)	Remus	13th voted out Day 90
38–40	April 2–4, 2023	Ștefania, Carmen, Bianca, Remus, Alin, Dan, [Ionuț]	None	Dan	None	None	Carmen (8–5)	Remus	13th voted out Day 90
38–40	April 2–4, 2023	Bianca, Carmen, Ștefania, Alin, Kamara, Andrei K.	None	Dan	None	None	Remus (1–0)	Remus	13th voted out Day 90
41–43	April 10–12, 2023	Alexandra P., Alin	None	Alin	None	None	Kamara (7–5)	Kamara	14th voted out Day 97
41–43	April 10–12, 2023	Alin, Alexandra C., Bianca, Kamara, Robert, Ștefania	None	Alin	None	None	Kamara (7–5)	Kamara	14th voted out Day 97
41–43	April 10–12, 2023	Ștefania [Bianca, Carmen, Andrei K.]	None	Alin	None	None	Dan (1–0)	Kamara	14th voted out Day 97
41–43	April 10–12, 2023	Dan, Alexandra C., Alexandra P., Andreea, Ionuț, Robert	None	Alin	None	None	Dan (1–0)	Kamara	14th voted out Day 97
44–46	April 17–19, 2023	Alin, Robert	None	Robert	None	None	Carmen (6–4)	Ionuț	Quit; Day 100
44–46	April 17–19, 2023	Robert, Alexandra P., Andrei K., Andreea, Ștefania	None	Robert	None	None	Carmen (6–4)	Ionuț	Quit; Day 100
44–46	April 17–19, 2023	Survivor; Auction	None	Robert	None	None	Alin (1–0)	Alin	15th voted out Day 106
44–46	April 17–19, 2023	Robert, Alexandra C., Alexandra P., Andreea, Dan	None	Robert	None	None	Alin (1–0)	Alin	15th voted out Day 106
47–49	April 24–26, 2023	Alexandra P., Andrei K.	None	Robert	None	None	Bianca (5–3–1)	Bianca	16th voted out Day 111
47–49	April 24–26, 2023	Alexandra P., Alexandra C., Andreea, Dan, Robert	None	Robert	None	None	Bianca (5–3–1)	Bianca	16th voted out Day 111
47–49	April 24–26, 2023	Robert [Andreea, Alexandra C.]	None	Robert	None	None	Andrei K. (1–0)	Bianca	16th voted out Day 111
47–49	April 24–26, 2023	Robert, Alexandra C., Alexandra P., Andreea, Dan	None	Robert	None	None	Andrei K. (1–0)	Bianca	16th voted out Day 111
50–52	May 1–3, 2023	Ștefania [Andrei K., Carmen, Dan]	None	Andrei K.	None	None	Ștefania (5–3)	Robert	17th voted out Day 118
50–52	May 1–3, 2023	Andrei K. [Carmen, Dan, Ștefania]	None	Andrei K.	None	None	Robert (1–0)	Robert	17th voted out Day 118
53–55	May 8–10, 2023	Andrei K. [Carmen, Ștefania]	None	Andrei K.	None	None	Ștefania (4–3)	Andreea	18th voted out Day 123
53–55	May 8–10, 2023	Alexandra C. [Alexandra P., Andreea]	None	Andrei K.	None	None	Andreea (1–0)	Andreea	18th voted out Day 123
56–58	May 15–17, 2023	Andrei K. [Carmen, Ștefania]	None	Dan	None	None	Andrei K., Alexandra C. (3–3)	Ștefania	19th voted out Day 128
56–58	May 15–17, 2023	Andrei K. [Carmen, Ștefania]	None	Dan	None	None	Ștefania (1–0)	Ștefania	19th voted out Day 128
59–61	May 22–24, 2023	None	None	Andrei K.	None	None	Alexandra C., Alexandra P., Carmen, Dan (No vote) (Note: No vote; Since Alexandra C., Alexandra P., Carmen and Dan were the only castaways without immunity, they were nominated by default.)	Alexandra P.	20th voted out Day 133
59–61	May 22–24, 2023	None	None	Dan	None	None	Alexandra C., Andrei K., Carmen (No vote) (Note: No vote; Since Alexandra C., Andrei K., and Carmen were the only castaways without immunity, they were nominated by default.)	Alexandra C.	21st voted out Day 134
59–61	May 22–24, 2023	None	None	Andrei K.	None	None	Carmen, Dan (No vote) (Note: No vote; Since Carmen and Dan were the only castaways without immunity, they were nominated by default.)	Carmen	22nd voted out Day 135
59–61	May 22–24, 2023	Public vote						Public vote	
59–61	May 22–24, 2023	Public vote						Andrei K.	Runner-up
59–61	May 22–24, 2023	Public vote						Dan	Sole Survivor

== Voting history ==
	Original tribes																																																								Merged tribe																													
Week #	1						2						3			4				5					6					7					8				9				10					11					12				13			14			15				16			17			18			19			20							
Episode #	2		3				4	5	6		7		9		10	12		13		14		15		16	17		18		19	20		21		22	23		24	25	26		27	28	29		30		31	32		33		34	36				39		40	42		43	44	45		46	48		49	51		52	54		55	57		58	59		60		61			
Voted Out	Nomination vote		Maria C.	Gheboasă	Exile camp vote		Elimination duel vote	Daria	Nomination vote		Sebastian	Maria L.	Nomination vote		Răzvan	Nomination vote		Jorge	Vica	Nomination vote				Andrei N.	Nomination vote				Codruța	Nomination vote				Eduard	Nomination vote			Alina	Nomination vote			Crina	Nomination vote				DOC	Nomination vote				Lucianna	Ada	Nomination vote		Mihai	Nomination vote		Remus	Nomination vote		Kamara	Ionuț	Nomination vote		Alin	Nomination vote		Bianca	Nomination vote		Robert	Nomination vote		Andreea	Nomination vote		Ștefania	Nomination	Alexandra P.	Nomination	Alexandra C.	Nomination	Carmen	Andrei K.	Dan
Nominated	Gheboasă	DOC & Maria C.			Ionuț	Andreea	Daria		Maria L.	Codruța & Andrei N.			Andrei N.	Răzvan & Codruța		Vica	DOC & Ada			Bianca & Remus	Kamara & Carmen	Codruța	Andrei N. & Alexandra C.		Alexandra P.	Alexandra C. & Codruța	Ada	Kamara & Bianca		Robert	Eduard & Alexandra C.	Ionuț	DOC & Kamara		Alina	Alexandra C. & Alexandra P.	Lucianna		Crina	DOC & Ada	Carmen		Ionuț	DOC & Ada	Alin	Lucianna & Robert		Kamara & Ada	Ionuț & Mihai	Lucianna	Andrei K. & Robert			Carmen	Remus & Mihai		Carmen	Remus		Kamara	Dan			Carmen	Alin		Bianca	Andrei K.		Ștefania	Robert		Ștefania	Andreea		Andrei K. Alexandra C.	Ștefania		Alexandra C. Alexandra P. Carmen & Dan		Alexandra C. Andrei K. & Carmen		Carmen & Dan			
Vote	9-1	1-1-0 (Note: The winner(s) of the Individual Immunity had to directly nominate a member of the tribe.)	Public vote	No vote (Note: No vote; After Maria C.'s elimination, Gheboasă elected to quit the game. No vote occurred for his removal.)	7-2 (Note: No vote; Ionuț was voted out verbally by the Faimoșii tribe. Due to the nature of the verbal vote, Ionuț did not cast a vote.)	9-1-1-1	1-0	Challenge (Note: Challenge; The castaway who finished last in the Exile Island Duel would be eliminated from the game. Daria came in last and was eliminated.)	9-1	1-1-0	No vote (Note: No vote; Sebastian was medically evacuated. No vote occurred for his removal.)	Public vote	8-1	1-1-0	Public vote	6-1	1-1-0	No vote (Note: No vote; Jorge was medically evacuated. No vote occurred for his removal.)	Public vote	3-3	1-1-0	6-1	1-1-0	Public vote	5-1-1	1-1-0	3-2-1	1-1-0	Public vote	5-3	1-1-0	4-2-1-1	1-1-0	Public vote	6-1	1-1-0	5-2	Public vote	5-3	1-1-0	4-3-1	Public vote	4-2	1-1-0	3-2-1	1-1-0	Public vote	3-3	1-1-0	4-1	1-1-0	Public vote	No vote (Note: No vote; Ada was medically evacuated. No vote occurred for her removal.)	3-1-1	1-1-0	Public vote	8-5	1-0	Public vote	7-5	1-0	Public vote	No vote (Note: No vote; Ionuț elected to quit the game. No vote occurred for his removal.)	6-4	1-0	Public vote	5-3-1	1-0	Public vote	5-3	1-0	Public vote	4-3	1-0	Public vote	3-3-0	1-0	Public vote	No vote (Note: No vote; Since Alexandra C., Alexandra P., Carmen and Dan were the only castaways without immunity, they were nominated by default.)	Public vote	No vote (Note: No vote; Since Alexandra C., Andrei and Carmen were the only castaways without immunity, they were nominated by default.)	Public vote	No vote (Note: No vote; Since Carmen and Dan were the only castaways without immunity, they were nominated by default.)	Public vote		
Voter	Vote																																																																																					
Dan	―				―	Andreea	―		Maria L.	—N/a	―	―	Andrei N.	—N/a	―	―				―		Codruța	—N/a	―	Alexandra P.	—N/a	―		―	Robert	—N/a	―		―	Alina	—N/a	Lucianna	―	―				―		—N/a	Robert	―	―		—N/a	Robert	―	―	―			Carmen	Remus	―	Kamara	—N/a	Saved	―	Carmen	—N/a	―	Bianca	—N/a	―	Ștefania	—N/a	―	Ștefania	—N/a	―	Andrei K.	Ștefania	―	Nominated	Saved	Immune		Nominated	Saved	Sole Survivor	
Andrei K.	―				―	Andreea	―		—N/a	Codruța	―	―	Andrei N.	—N/a	―	―				―		—N/a	Andrei N.	―	—N/a	Codruța	―		―	Alina	—N/a	―		―	Alina	—N/a	Lucianna	―	―				―		Alin	—N/a	―	―		Lucianna	—N/a	Saved	―	―			Carmen	—N/a	―	Kamara	—N/a	―	―	Carmen	—N/a	―	Alexandra P.	—N/a	Saved	Alexandra P.	Robert	―	Alexandra P.	Andreea	―	Alexandra C.	Nominated	Saved	Immune		Nominated	Saved	Immune		Runner-up	
Carmen	Gheboasă	—N/a	―		Ionuț	―	―		―		―	―	―			Vica	—N/a	―		Remus	—N/a	Nominated		Saved	―		—N/a	Kamara	―	―		Ionuț	—N/a	―	―				Kamara	—N/a	Kamara	Saved	Ionuț	—N/a	―		—	Kamara	—N/a	―		—	—	Kamara	Nominated	Saved	Andrei K.	Nominated	Saved	Andreea	—N/a	―	―	Andreea	Nominated	Saved	Andreea	—N/a	―	Alexandra P.	—N/a	―	Alexandra P.	—N/a	―	Alexandra C.	—N/a	―	Nominated	Saved	Nominated	Saved	Nominated	Voted Out		
Alexandra C.	Not in Game						Daria	Won	Maria L.	—N/a	―	―	Andrei N.	—N/a	―	―				―		Codruța	—N/a	Saved	Andreea	—N/a	Nominated		Saved	Robert	—N/a	Nominated		Saved	Alina	—N/a	Lucianna	Saved	―				―		Alin	—N/a	―	―		Lucianna	—N/a	―	―	―			Carmen	—N/a	―	Kamara	—N/a	―	―	Carmen	—N/a	―	Bianca	—N/a	―	Ștefania	—N/a	―	Ștefania	—N/a	―	Andrei K.	Nominated	Saved	Nominated	Saved	Nominated	Voted Out				
Alexandra P.	―				―	Andreea	―		—N/a	Andrei N.	―	―	—N/a	Codruța	―	―				―		Sick Day (Note: Sick Day; Due to medical intervention by production, Alexandra P. did not attend Tribal Council but not be deemed unable to continue with the game. As she could not attend Tribal Council, she could not vote, nor be voted out.)		―	Alin	Nominated			Saved	Robert	—N/a	―		―	Alina	—N/a	Lucianna	Saved	―				―		Alin	—N/a	―	―		—N/a	Andrei K.	―	―	―			Carmen	—N/a	―	Kamara	—N/a	―	―	Carmen	—N/a	―	Bianca	—N/a	―	Ștefania	—N/a	―	Ștefania	—N/a	―	Andrei K.	—N/a	―	Nominated	Voted Out						
Ștefania	—N/a	DOC	―		DOC	―	―		―		―	―	―			Vica	—N/a	―		Remus	—N/a	―		―	―		Kamara	—N/a	―	―		DOC	—N/a	―	―				—N/a	DOC	—N/a	—	—N/a	DOC	―		—	Kamara	—N/a	―		—	—	—N/a	Mihai	—	Andrei K.	—N/a	―	Andreea	—N/a	―	―	Andreea	—N/a	―	Andreea	—N/a	―	Alexandra P.	Nominated	Saved	Alexandra P.	Nominated	Saved	Alexandra C.	—N/a	Voted Out								
Andreea	―				―	Alin	Returned	―	Maria L.	—N/a	―	―	Andrei N.	—N/a	―	―				―		—N/a	Alexandra C.	―	Alexandra P.	—N/a	―		―	Alina	—N/a	―		―	—N/a	Alexandra C.	—N/a	―	―				―		—N/a	Lucianna	―	―		Lucianna	—N/a	―	―	―			Carmen	—N/a	―	Kamara	—N/a	―	―	Carmen	—N/a	―	Bianca	—N/a	―	Ștefania	—N/a	―	Ștefania	—N/a	Voted Out											
Robert	―				―	Andreea	―		―		―	―	Andrei N.	—N/a	―	―				―		Codruța	—N/a	―	Alexandra P.	—N/a	―		―	Alina	Nominated			Saved	Alina	—N/a	Andrei K.	―	―				―		Lucianna	—N/a	Saved	―		Lucianna	—N/a	Saved	―	―			Carmen	—N/a	―	Kamara	—N/a	―	―	Carmen	Alin	―	Bianca	Andrei K.	―	Ștefania	—N/a	Voted Out														
Bianca	Gheboasă	—N/a	―		Ionuț	―	―		―		―	―	―			—N/a	DOC	―		Remus	Nominated			Saved	―		Ionuț	—N/a	Saved	―		Ionuț	—N/a	—	―				Crina	—N/a	Kamara	—	Ionuț	—N/a	―		—	—N/a	Mihai	―		—	—	Carmen	—N/a	—	Andrei K.	—N/a	―	Andreea	—N/a	―	―	Andreea	—N/a	―	Andreea	Nominated	Voted Out																	
Alin	―				―	Andreea	―		Maria L.	—N/a	―	―	—N/a	Răzvan	―	―				―		Codruța	—N/a	―	Alexandra P.	—N/a	―		―	—N/a	Eduard	―		―	—N/a	Alexandra P.	—N/a	―	―				―		Alexandra C.	—N/a	Saved	Kidnapped (Note: Kidnapped; Alin was kidnapped until after the last Reward Challenge of the week, which meant he could not be voted out or participate in the vote.)					―	―			Carmen	—N/a	―	Kamara	Dan	―	―	Andreea	—N/a	Voted Out																				
Ionuț	—N/a	Maria C.	―		—N/a		Returned	―	―		―	―	―			Vica	—N/a	―		Bianca	—N/a	―		―	―		Ada	—N/a	―	―		Crina	Nominated	Saved	―				—N/a	Ada	—N/a	—	Bianca	Nominated			Saved	Ada	—N/a	Nominated		Saved	—	—N/a	Remus	—	Carmen	—N/a	―	Andreea	—N/a	―	Quit																							
Kamara	Not in Game						Entered	―	―		―	―	―			—N/a	Ada	―		Bianca	—N/a	Nominated		Saved	―		Ada	—N/a	Saved	―		Ionuț	—N/a	Saved	―				Crina	—N/a	Carmen	—	Ionuț	—N/a	―		—	Ada	Nominated			Saved	—	Bianca	—N/a	—	Andrei K.	—N/a	―	Andreea	Nominated	Voted Out																								
Remus	Gheboasă	—N/a	―		DOC	―	―		―		―	―	―			Vica	—N/a	―		Bianca	Nominated			Saved	―		—N/a	Bianca	―	―		—N/a	DOC	―	―				Crina	—N/a	Carmen	—	Kidnapped (Note: Kidnapped; Remus was kidnapped until after the last Reward Challenge of the week, which meant he could not be voted out or participate in the vote.)					—N/a	Ionuț	―		―	—	Carmen	—N/a	Saved	Andrei K.	—N/a	Voted Out																											
Mihai	Not in Game																								Exempt (Note: Exempt; As new castaways, Alina, Crina, Eduard and Mihai were exempt from the nomination process)					―		Ionuț	—N/a	―	―				Crina	—N/a	Carmen	—	—N/a	Ada	―		—	Ada	—N/a	Nominated		Saved	—	Carmen	—N/a	Voted Out																														
Ada	Gheboasă	—N/a	―		Ionuț	―	―		―		―	―	―			Vica	—N/a	―	Saved	—N/a	Kamara	―		—	―		Ionuț	Nominated	Saved	―		—N/a	Kamara	—	―				Crina	—N/a	Carmen	Saved	Ionuț	—N/a	Nominated		Saved	Kamara	Nominated			Saved	Evacuated																																	
Lucianna	―				―	Andreea	―		Maria L.	—N/a	―	―	Andrei N.	—N/a	―	―				―		Codruța	—N/a	―	—N/a	Alexandra C.	―		―	—N/a	Alexandra C.	―		―	Alina	—N/a	Andrei K.	Saved	―				―		Alexandra C.	—N/a	Saved	―		Alexandra C.	—N/a	Voted Out																																		
DOC	Gheboasă	—N/a	Saved	―	Ionuț	―	―		―		―	―	―			Vica	—N/a	―	Saved	—N/a	Carmen	―		―	―		Ada	—N/a	―	―		Kamara	—N/a	Saved	―				Kamara	—N/a	Kamara	Saved	Bianca	—N/a	Nominated		Voted Out																																							
Crina	Not in Game																								Exempt					―		Kamara	—N/a	―	―				Kamara	Nominated	Mihai	Voted Out																																												
Alina	Not in Game																								Exempt					Robert	—N/a	―		―	Robert	Nominated	Lucianna	Voted Out																																																
Eduard	Not in Game																								Exempt					Robert	—N/a	Nominated		Voted Out																																																				
Codruța	―				―	Andreea	―		Maria L.	—N/a	—	Saved	Andrei N.	—N/a	Saved	―				―		Andrei N.	Nominated	Saved	Alexandra P.	—N/a	Nominated		Voted Out																																																									
Andrei N.	―				―	Andreea	―		Maria L.	—N/a	―	Saved	Codruța	Nominated	Saved	―				―		Codruța	—N/a	Voted Out																																																														
Vica	Gheboasă	—N/a	―		Ionuț	―	―		―		―	―	―			DOC	Nominated		Voted Out																																																																			
Jorge	Gheboasă	—N/a	―		Ionuț	―	―		―		―	―	―			Sick Day (Note: Sick Day; Due to medical intervention by production, Jorge did not attend Tribal Council but not be deemed unable to continue with the game. As he could not attend Tribal Council, he could not vote, nor be voted out.)		Evacuated																																																																				
Răzvan	―				―	Andrei N.	―		Maria L.	—N/a	―	―	Andrei N.	—N/a	Voted Out																																																																							
Maria L.	―				―	Robert	―		Codruța	Nominated		Voted Out																																																																										
Sebastian	Gheboasă	—N/a	―		Ionuț	―	―		―		Evacuated																																																																											
Daria	―				―	Andreea	Nominated	Eliminated																																																																														
Gheboasă	Carmen	Nominated	Saved	Quit																																																																																		
Maria C.	Gheboasă	—N/a	Voted Out																																																																																			

== Controversies ==
In Week 2, two contestants from the Războinici tribe competed against each other, even though the blue team held the Immunity Totem, which provided protection for all members of the tribe. Daria Chiper lost the challenge and was eliminated. This was an absolute premiere in the Roamanian version of the show, as it marked the first time a contestant was eliminated from the game without a public vote. The change in format surprised everyone and disappointed the show's fans, who accused the producers of behind-the-scenes manipulation. A significant portion of viewers felt that the elimination was unfair because it violated the fundamental principle established in the first three seasons of Survivor România, namely that only the public, through voting, decide who stays and who leaves.
