= Alex Delea =

Romanian reality TV personality

- Born: Alexandru Delea; September 4, 1996 (age 29); Constanța, Romania
- Television: Survivor România 2022; Survivor România All Stars

Alex Delea (born September 4, 1996) is a Romanian bartender and television personality who became known for his appearances on the reality game show Survivor România. He won the first season he appeared on, Survivor România 2022. In 2024, he returned and placed 10th on Survivor România All Stars.

== Early life ==
Delea was born in a poor family in Constanța on September 4, 1996. Delea's parents divorced when he was very young, and he was raised by his mother, aunt, and grandmother. After turning 17, Delea moved to Spain, where he worked as a bartender.

After Survivor, Delea moved to Romania, and in 2023 he made his acting debut in "Haita de acțiune."

== Survivor România ==
=== 2022 ===
Delea was part of the "Războinicii" tribe and made a name for himself in various challenges, earning the respect of the other contestants from the beginning. His strategy was based both on the physical aspect of the game, becoming an important pillar for his tribe, and on the social side of the game, building strong relationships with each tribe member and being involved in the most important decisions in the game. After winning the last three immunity challenges, Delea qualified for the season finale when the public rewarded him with the title of the Sole Survivor.

=== 2023 ===
Delea, along with Zannidache, Elena Chiriac and Oana Ciocan, participated in the show's 4th season which aired in 2023. Neither participated in any direct aspect of the game, but instead, they served as mentors to any player, offering advice on various topics deemed valuable attributes of a Survivor player. Neither mentor was in contention to win prize.

=== All Stars ===
Delea accepted a spot on "Survivor Romania All Stars" , a special edition with former contestants from previous seasons. He was one of three previous winners chosen; the other two were: Elena Ionescu and Edmond Zannidache. Once again, he was part of the "Războinicii" tribe. Delea formed an alliance with the other guys in the tribe, creating a strong bond that helped him strengthen his position in the game. After the merge, Delea became part of the "Războinicii" alliance consisting of himself and the remaining "Războinicii" tribe members. At the 15th tribal council, after Zannidache played the hidden immunity idol, negating all the votes cast against Ștefi by the "Războinicii" alliance, Delea became one of the five contestants who entered the Elimination duel. He lost the duel, becoming the 14th eliminated contestant.

== Other media appearances ==
In 2023, Delea was the host of the pilot show "Survivor: Camp Log".
