= Otilia Brumă =

- Born: Otilia Brumă; 13 June 1992 (age 34); Suceava, Romania
- Genres: Pop, House
- Occupation: Singer
- Years active: 2012-present
- Labels: Roton Music, JHaps Records

Otilia Brumă (born 13 June 1992) is a Romanian pop singer and songwriter.

== Early life ==
Brumă was born on 13 June 1992 in Suceava, Romania in a modest family.

== Music singles ==
- Bilionera (2014)
- Passion (2015)
- Diamante (2020)

== Bibliography ==
- Suceava: Otilia Brumă - De pe băncile școlii, pe scena muzicii (PORTRET), 6 noiembrie 2010, Adevărul
- „Cel mai celebru artist al anului 2014 în Turcia" e o româncă, 2 martie 2015, Evz Monden
- Otilia Brumă premiată de ambasadorul Turciei, Revista Bravo
