= Xonia =

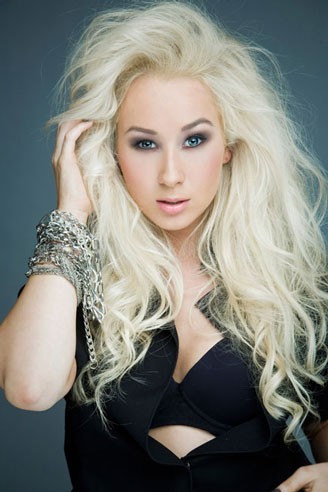
- Xonia, posed photo, 2009

Background information
- Also known as: Xonia
- Born: Loredana Sachelaru; 25 June 1989 (age 37); Melbourne, Australia
- Genres: Pop, dance, electronic
- Occupations: Singer, songwriter, actress, dancer
- Years active: 2008–present
- Labels: Universal Music Romania, MediaPro Music
- Website: www.xoniamusic.com

Xonia (born Loredana Sachelaru; 25 June 1989) is an Australian-born Romanian singer, songwriter, actress and dancer.

== Biography ==
=== 1989–2007: Early life and education ===
Xonia was born 25 June 1989 in Melbourne, Australia to Romanian parents. Her birth name is Loredana Sachelaru but she was known as "Xonia" since her teen years.

In 1997, Xonia began showing interest in music and was subsequently signed to a recording contract with a local label in early 2003. Throughout her adolescence she worked with several music producers such as Rob Davis, Doug Brady and Kevin Colbert in order to record her debut album. Simultaneously, Xonia graduated the Australian Ballet School (Certificate III in Dance) and was taken under the mentorship of Robert Sturrock, a well-known choreographer and dance coach. In early 2000s Xonia put aside her musical career and focused on acting; shortly after she had a number of cameo appearances in high-profile TV series such as Noah's Arc, SeaChange, Holly's Heroes and Neighbours.

In 2006, Xonia was selected to represent Australia at the international Beauty Contest "Miss Diaspora", where she had the opportunity to perform in front of 20,000 live spectators. Same year later she performed in the Melbourne Commonwealth Games opening and closing ceremonies and was selected to dance with a guest star, the football player Nathan Brown from Richmond team. Throughout 2007, Xonia showcased her choreography abilities while working with pop singer Georgina Ward for her live shows; eventually she was featured as a backup dancer in some of the music videos produced by Ian Smith and Laura Gissara. At the age of 19, Xonia enrolled in at the Hollywood Pop Academy in California, where she studied dance theory for a short time.

=== 2008–present: Career breakthrough ===
In early 2008, Xonia started touring the United States, where she sang for the Romanian diaspora at some social events. Eventually she spent some time in New York recording music and working on her original material. Whilst living in America, Xonia received an invitation to participate as a jury member at the annual Miss Diaspora Contest; she accepted the invitation and performed on the stage of the Callatis Festival same year later. Shortly after this representation, as a reward for her musical efforts, she was given a record deal with Star Management Romania in order to launch her career.

Xonia's debut single, titled "Someone to Love You", was released in late 2009 and enjoyed moderate success. Same year later she was selected to represent Australia at the international music festival the Golden Stag, where she performed two songs: "Dirty Dancer" and "Trandafir de la Moldova". Impressed by her vocal ability showcased during the contest, the Universal Romania representatives offered her a management contract. Eventually Xonia released a single in early 2010, entitled "Take the Lead", which has received favorable reactions and created a significant buzz on the internet.

In early 2010 Xonia collaborated with the Romanian pop band Deepcentral on a single called "My Beautiful One". Xonia is currently working on her debut album with some well-known Romanian music producers including Marius Moga, George Hora, Mihai Ogășanu and Deepcentral.

In 2013 Xonia released her new single "Ping Pong" through Red Cover Media Label. Song was produced by F.Charm and written by Xonia herself. Video for song premiered on 8 July. Video consists of Xonia either dancing in empty warehouse with back-up dancers or alone, walking outside the warehouse with two little dancers. In an interview with Cosmopolitan Romania, Sachelaru revealed that "she wanted to change herself, so she started with music". Ping Pong is reggae influenced track with a little bit of urban sound, but it's still very friendly to radio sound. The song was performed on several TV shows and concerts, such as Razboieni, Romanian Top Hits, Show Pacatos and Access Direct.

== Discography ==
- Take The Lead (digital EP - 2009) | Universal Music Romania.

=== Singles ===
- "Someone to Love You" (2009)
- "Take the Lead” (2010)
- "My Beautiful One" (2010)
- "Hold On" (2011)
- "Remember" (2012)
- "Ping Pong" (2013)
- "You and I" (2014)
- "I Want Cha (ft J Balvin)" (2014)
- "Vino Inapoi" (2014)
- "Vino Inapoi|Again" (2015)
- "Booty Down" (2016)
- "Find You" (2016)
- "Crave You" (2018)
- "Discrete” (2018)
