= Emil Rengle =

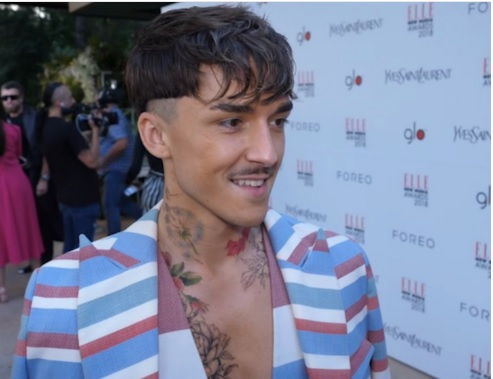

Background information
- Born: Emil Rengle; 1 September 1990 (age 36)
- Origin: Oradea, Romania
- Genre: Pop
- Occupations: Composer, choreographer, dancer, film director, soloist
- Years active: 1998-present

Emil Rengle (born 1 September 1990 in Oradea, Romania) is a Romanian composer, choreographer, dancer, film director, and soloist. He is the winner of the eighth season of Romania's Got Talent and the first dancer in the show's history to win the grand prize.

== Career ==
In 2015, Rengle founded the musical project called RENGLE, through which he released the singles "Click Click," "Say Cheese," "Lost You in Hong Kong," and "China" under the Roton record label. Emil was invited to be part of the artistic team for the MTV Europe Music Awards in 2015 thus being the only Romanian that is joining the artists who will tread the boards at the famous show hosted this year by British Ed Sheeran.

His dancing abilities have been perfected step by step, first at the National Theatre and Cinema University, then across the biggest dance schools all over the world such as Broadway Dance Center from New York, Pineapple Dance Studio from London or Debbie Reynolds from Los Angeles. At the age of 18, he won the Hip Hop International championship along with signing the choreography of the first dance band in Romania that took part in the Worlds Hip Hop Championships in Las Vegas.

Rengle is also known for his work as a choreographer with artists such as Alex Velea, Antonia, Loredana Groza, DJ Andi, Fly Project, Anda Adam, Corina, Alexandra Stan, Inna, and the late artist Anca Pop. He has also participated in events such as Coca Cola (Taste the Feeling), Media Music Awards 2012, Dubai XL Club, Untold Festival, and is the head choreographer for the show Vocea României (The Voice of Romania).

== Românii au talent ==
In 2018 Rengle won the originality award worth €10,000 and the grand prize worth €120,000 at the competition show Românii au talent (Romania's Got Talent). He donated his €10,000 prize to Bianca Badea, the contestant who finished in second place in the talent show on Pro TV.

== America's Got Talent: The Champions season 2 ==
In 2019 Emil Rengle's Preliminary performance in America's Got Talent: The Champions season 2 consisted of performing a dance routine in high heels flanked by two other dancers to Billie Eilish's "Bad Guy". Howie Mandel and Simon Cowell buzzed the act. Rengle did not receive enough votes from the Superfans to advance to the Semifinals, eliminating him from the competition along with Voices of Service instead of Strauss Serpent.

== Personal life ==
In a video posted on his YouTube channel, Emil Rengle acknowledged that he is bisexual. Currently, Rengle is engaged to Alejandro Fernandez.

== Discography ==
=== Singles ===
Title	Year	Album
„Click Click”	2015	—N/a
„Say Cheese” (Klyde with DREI and Rengle)	2016	—N/a
„Lost You in Hong Kong”	2017	—N/a
„Merry Tik Tok” (& Olivia Addams)	2020	—N/a

=== Music videos ===
Year	Music video	Director
2016	„Click Click”	Bogdan Păun and Emil Rengle
2016	„Say Cheese” (Klyde, Drei and RENGLE)	Bogdan Păun and Catalin Alionte
2016	„China”	Bogdan Păun
2017	„Lost You in Hong Kong	Bogdan Păun
