= Survivor România All Stars =

- Season 5
- Promotional poster
- Presented by: Daniel Pavel
- No. of days: 103
- No. of castaways: 26
- Winner: Edmond Zannidache
- Runner-up: Iancu Sterp
- Location: La Romana, Dominican Republic
- No. of episodes: 60

Release
- Original network: Pro TV; Voyo
- Original release: 16 January – 30 May 2024

Additional information
- Filming dates: 4 January – 15 April 2024 and 30 May 2024

Season chronology
- ← Previous; 2023 Next → 2025

Survivor România: All Stars, is the fifth season of Romanian Survivor which aired on Pro TV and Voyo. For the first time, the season features 20 returning contestants from the four previous seasons. The twenty contestants were initially divided into two tribes based on their prior reputation in their previous seasons, Faimoșii and Războinicii.

The season premiered on 16 January 2024 and concluded on 30 May 2024, where Edmond Zannidache became the first two-time Survivor România winner, defeating Iancu Sterp. Daniel Pavel returned as host.

== Production ==
=== Development and filming ===
Since August 2023 several rumours of an "All Stars" series being in development had been reported in various news outlets. In December 2023, the commissioning of Survivor România All Stars was officially announced by Pro TV. The show is set to feature a line-up consisting of former contestants from the previous four series. With the second teaser trailer released on 15 December, the twenty all stars were revealed.

The season was filmed in Dominican Republic, the same location of the previous seasons, from January 4 to April 15, 2024.

=== Elimination duels ===
This season introduced "Elimination duels" to the Romanian version of Survivor, based in part on concepts already used in foreign versions of the show, including Mexico, Czech Republic & Slovakia and Croatia & Serbia. Instead of being out of the game by public vote, the nominees of the cycle face a challenge in which the loser is eliminated. The public will votes only in the Grand Final for the most deserving of the title of Sole Survivor.

=== Broadcast ===
The series is scheduled to premiere on January 16, 2024 on Pro TV and Voyo and will air from Tuesday to Thursday at 21:30 p.m. Since February 13, the show will air from Monday to Wednesday at 21:30 p.m on Voyo and the day before on Pro TV.

== Contestants ==
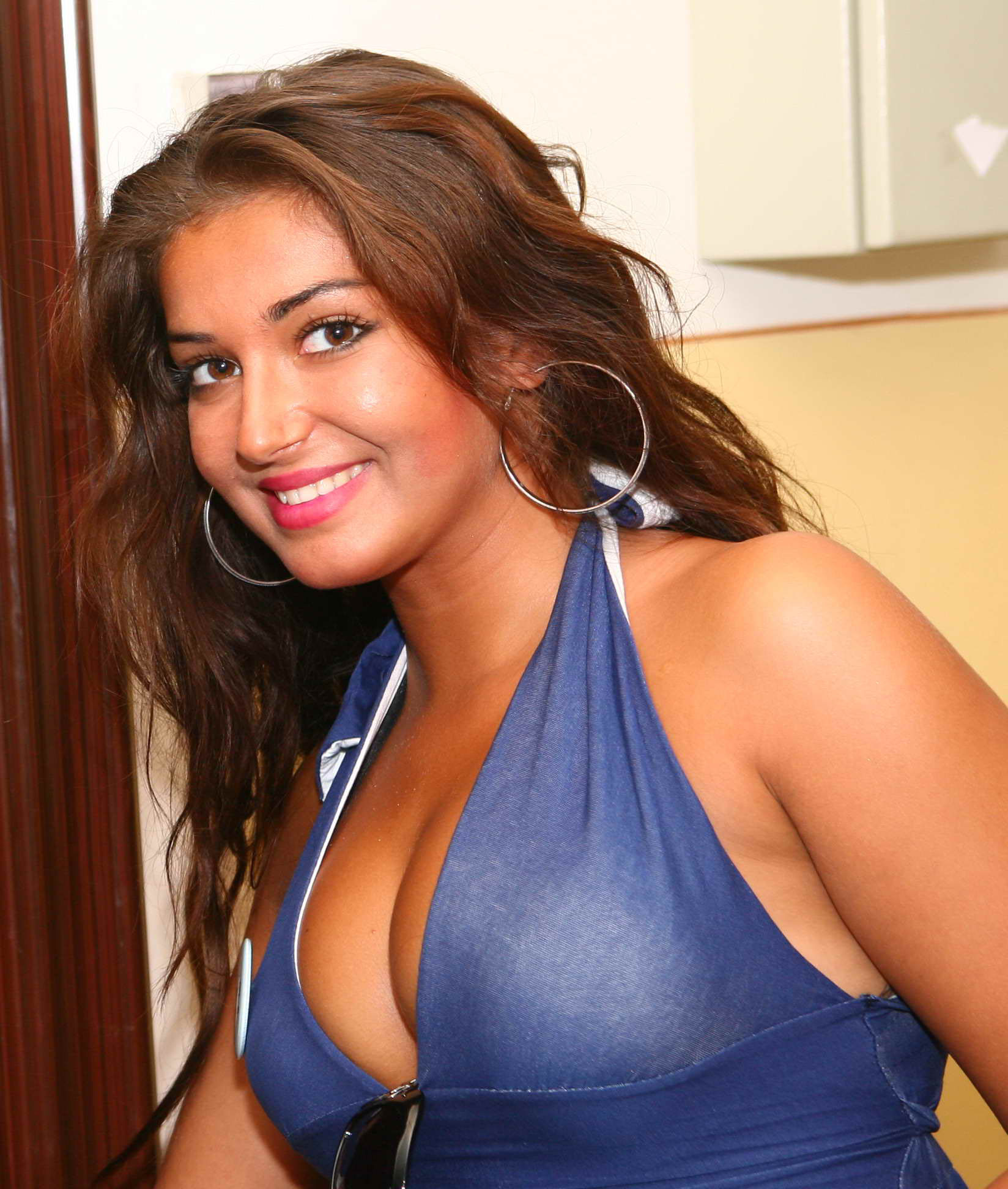
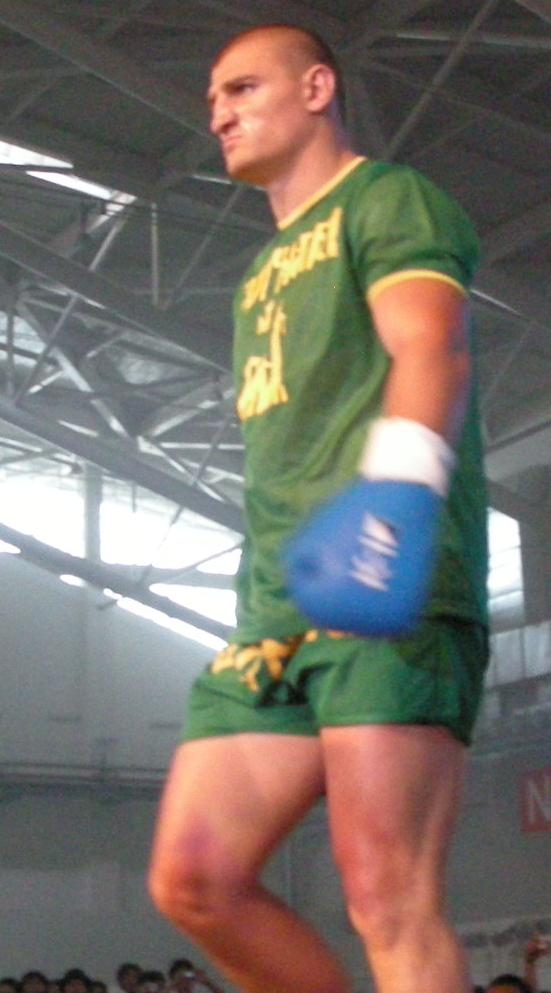
From left to right: Elena Ionescu and Cătălin Moroșanu

The twenty returning contestants were divided into two tribes of twelve by previews status: "Faimoșii" (overachievers) & "Războinicii" (underdogs).

Six contestants were added later in the game in both tribes. On Week 14, the thirteen remaining players merged into one tribe, named Los Bandidos.

List of Survivor România All Stars contestants
Contestant	Age	From	Occupation	Tribe					Finish	
Contestant	Age	From	Occupation	Original	First swapped	Second swapped	None	Merged	Placement	Day
Andreea Tonciu Season 3	37	Bucharest	Television and media personality	Faimoșii					1st eliminated	Day 7
Elena Ionescu Season 1	35	Caracal, Olt	Pop singer	Faimoșii					2nd eliminated	Day 13
Relu Pănescu Season 3	52	Arad, Arad	Entrepreneur	Războinicii					3rd eliminated	Day 19
Roxana Nemeș Season 2	34	Târgu Mureș, Mureș	Singer	Faimoșii					Medically evacuated	Day 25
Elena Marin Season 2	36	Bucharest	Choreographer	Faimoșii					4th eliminated	Day 25
Maria Lungu Season 4	29	Chișinău, Moldova	Fashion designer	Războinicii	Faimoșii				5th eliminated	Day 38
Ionuț "Jador" Dumitrache Season 2	28	Parincea, Bacău	Manele music singer	Faimoșii	Faimoșii				Ejected	Day 44
Cătălin Moroșanu Season 2	39	Cotnari, Iași	Kickboxer	Faimoșii	Faimoșii				6th eliminated	Day 44
George "Jorge" Papagheorghe Season 4	41	Constanța, Constanța	Singer and TV host	Faimoșii	Războinicii				Medically evacuated	Day 50
Cătălin Zmărăndescu Season 3	51	Bucharest	Brazilian jiu-jitsu coach	Faimoșii	Faimoșii				7th eliminated	Day 50
Oana Ciocan Season 3	26	Bacău, Bacău	Sales consultant		Războinicii				8th eliminated	Day 57
Maria Chițu Season 2	23	Câmpina, Prahova	Nursing student	Războinicii	Războinicii				9th eliminated	Day 62
Alexandra Ciomag Season 4	21	Bucharest	Make-up artist	Războinicii	Faimoșii				10th eliminated	Day 69
Lola Crudu Season 1	37	Chișinău, Moldova	Operations manager and fitness trainer	Războinicii	Războinicii	Războinicii			11th eliminated	Day 79
Ana Maria Pal Season 1	30	Bacău, Bacău	MMA Fighter		Faimoșii	Faimoșii	None (Note: At the start of the individual phase of the game on Day 80, players had to earn their way into the merged tribe by winning pre-merge challenge.)		12th eliminated	Day 80
Alexandra Duli Season 3	26	London, United Kingdom	Receptionist	Războinicii	Războinicii	Războinicii	None	Los Bandidos	13th eliminated	Day 82
Alex Delea Season 3	27	Constanța, Constanța	Content creator	Războinicii	Războinicii	Războinicii	None	Los Bandidos	14th eliminated	Day 86
Ana Porgras Season 2	30	Galați, Galați	Former elite gymnast	Faimoșii	Faimoșii	Faimoșii	None	Los Bandidos	Medically evacuated	Day 89
Ștefania "Ștefi" Stănilă Season 4	26	Aninoasa, Hunedoara	Gymnastics champion and gymnastics coach	Faimoșii	Faimoșii	Faimoșii	None	Los Bandidos	15th eliminated	Day 92
Ștefania Ștefan Season 3	28	Lupeni, Hunedoara	Gaming video creator	Războinicii	Războinicii	Războinicii	None	Los Bandidos	16th eliminated	Day 96
Tiberiu "TJ Miles" Iordache Season 3	36	Constanța, Constanța	Business owner and influencer	Faimoșii	Faimoșii	Faimoșii	None	Los Bandidos	17th eliminated	Day 100
Robert Moscalu Season 4	26	Murfatlar, Constanța	Bartender	Războinicii	Războinicii	Războinicii	None	Los Bandidos	18th eliminated	Day 101
Sorin Pușcașu Season 2	33	Ploiești, Prahova	Entrepreneur and content creator	Războinicii	Războinicii	Războinicii	None	Los Bandidos	19th eliminated	Day 102
Andrei Ciobanu Season 1	33	Bacău, Bacău	Music teacher	Războinicii	Faimoșii	Războinicii	None	Los Bandidos	20th eliminated	Day 103
Iancu Sterp Season 1	25	Tuștea, Hunedoara	Amateur MMA fighter	Războinicii	Războinicii	Războinicii	None	Los Bandidos	Runner-up	Day 103
Edmond Zannidache Season 2	25	Bucharest	Trapper	Faimoșii	Faimoșii	Faimoșii	None	Los Bandidos	Sole Survivor	Day 103

== Season summary ==
Challenge winners and eliminations by cycle
Episode(s)		Challenge winner(s)			Nominated (vote)	Eliminated	Finish
No.	Original air date	Reward	Tribal immunity	Individual immunity	Nominated (vote)	Eliminated	Finish
1–3	January 16–18, 2024	Faimoșii	Războinicii	TJ Miles	Andreea (9-1)	Andreea	1st Eliminated; Day 7
1–3	January 16–18, 2024	Războinicii	Războinicii	TJ Miles	Andreea (9-1)	Andreea	1st Eliminated; Day 7
1–3	January 16–18, 2024	Războinicii	Războinicii	TJ Miles	Roxana (1-0)	Andreea	1st Eliminated; Day 7
4-6	January 23–25, 2024	Războinicii	Războinicii	Jorge [Elena M., Zmărăndescu] (Note: As new castaways, Elena M. and Zmărăndescu were exempt from the nomination process.)	Roxana (9-2)	Elena I.	2nd Eliminated; Day 13
4-6	January 23–25, 2024	Războinicii	Războinicii	Jorge [Elena M., Zmărăndescu]	Elena I. (1-0)	Elena I.	2nd Eliminated; Day 13
7-9	January 30– February 1, 2024	Războinicii	Faimoșii	Sorin	Maria L. (9-3)	Relu	3rd Eliminated; Day 19
7-9	January 30– February 1, 2024	Faimoșii	Faimoșii	Sorin	Relu (1-0)	Relu	3rd Eliminated; Day 19
10-12	February 6–8, 2024	Războinicii	Războinicii	Jador	Jorge (8-1)	Roxana	Evacuated; Day 25
10-12	February 6–8, 2024	Ana (Note: The Războinicii tribe were told to invite a castaway from the Faimoșii tribe on their reward; they chose Ana.)	Războinicii	Jador	Jorge (8-1)	Roxana	Evacuated; Day 25
10-12	February 6–8, 2024	Războinicii	Războinicii	Jador	Elena M. (1-0)	Elena M.	4th Eliminated; Day 25
13-15	February 13–15, 2024	Faimoșii	Războinicii	TJ Miles, [Ana, Ștefi] (Note: Due to the small number of girls in the Faimoșii tribe, Ana and Ștefi were automatically immune.)	Jorge (7-1)	No elimination on Day 31 due to a tribe swap vote (Note: Instead of nominate two players, Faimoșii unknowingly voted for two players to become the leaders. Jorge and Jador became leaders and had the responsibility of forming new tribes.)	
13-15	February 13–15, 2024	Survivor; Auction	Războinicii	TJ Miles, [Ana, Ștefi]	Jorge (7-1)	No elimination on Day 31 due to a tribe swap vote	
13-15	February 13–15, 2024	Faimoșii	Războinicii	TJ Miles, [Ana, Ștefi]	Jador (1-0)	No elimination on Day 31 due to a tribe swap vote	
16-18	February 20–22, 2024	Războinicii	Războinicii	Ana	Alexandra C. (7-2-1)	Maria L.	5th Eliminated; Day 38
16-18	February 20–22, 2024	Războinicii	Războinicii	Ana	Maria L. (1-0)	Maria L.	5th Eliminated; Day 38
19-21	February 27–29, 2024	Faimoșii	Războinicii	Zannidache	Zmărăndescu (7-1)	Jador	Ejected; Day 44
19-21	February 27–29, 2024	Războinicii	Războinicii	Zannidache	Moroșanu (1-0)	Moroșanu	6th Eliminated; Day 44
22-24	March 5–7, 2024	Războinicii	Războinicii	TJ Miles [Ana Maria] (Note: As new castaway, Ana Maria was exempt from the nomination process.)	Zmărăndescu (7-0)	Jorge	Evacuated; Day 50
22-24	March 5–7, 2024	Faimoșii	Războinicii	TJ Miles [Ana Maria]	Zannidache (1-0)	Zmărăndescu	7th Eliminated; Day 50
25-27	March 12–14, 2024	Faimoșii	Faimoșii	Ștefania	Lola (8-1)	Oana	8th Eliminated; Day 57
25-27	March 12–14, 2024	Războinicii	Faimoșii	Ștefania	Oana (1-0)	Oana	8th Eliminated; Day 57
28-30	March 19–21, 2024	Faimoșii	Faimoșii	Sorin	Alexandra D. (1-0) (Note: Zannidache played a hidden immunity idol on Lola, therefore seven votes against her were not counted.)	Maria C.	9th Eliminated; Day 62
28-30	March 19–21, 2024	Faimoșii	Faimoșii	Sorin	Maria C. (1-0)	Maria C.	9th Eliminated; Day 62
31-33	March 26–28, 2024	Faimoșii	Războinicii	Ștefi	Ana (2-1-0) (Note: Iancu played a hidden immunity idol on Ana Maria, therefore four votes against her were not counted.)	Alexandra C.	10th Eliminated; Day 69
31-33	March 26–28, 2024	Războinicii	Războinicii	Ștefi	Alexandra C. (1-0)	Alexandra C.	10th Eliminated; Day 69
34-36	April 2–4, 2024	Războinicii	Războinicii	Ștefi	Ana Maria (5-1)	Andrei	Sent to Războincii tribe Day 74 (Note: Andrei lost the duel against Ana Maria, but instead of being eliminated from the game, he was sent to the Răboinicii tribe.)
34-36	April 2–4, 2024	Faimoșii	Războinicii	Ștefi	Andrei (1-0)	Andrei	Sent to Războincii tribe Day 74
37-39	April 9–11, 2024	Faimoșii	Faimoșii	Iancu	Andrei (6-2)	Lola	11th Eliminated; Day 79
37-39	April 9–11, 2024	Faimoșii	Faimoșii	Iancu	Lola (1-0)	Lola	11th Eliminated; Day 79
40-42	April 16–18, 2024	Robert	None	TJ Miles	Ana (7-3-1)	Ana Maria	12th Eliminated; Day 80
40-42	April 16–18, 2024	TJ Miles, Iancu, Robert, Ștefi, Ștefania	None	TJ Miles	Alexandra D. (1-0)	Alexandra D.	13th Eliminated; Day 82
43-45	April 23–15, 2024	Robert, Sorin (Note: Capitan's challenge)	None	Ștefania	Alex, Andrei, Robert, Sorin (1-1-1-1-0) (Note: Zannidache played a hidden immunity idol on Ștefi, therefore six votes against her were not counted.)	Alex	14th Eliminated; Day 86
43-45	April 23–15, 2024	Sorin, Alex, Andrei, Iancu, Ștefania	None	Ștefania	Alex, Andrei, Robert, Sorin (1-1-1-1-0)	Alex	14th Eliminated; Day 86
43-45	April 23–15, 2024	Ștefania, Alex, Robert, Ștefi, Zannidache	None	Ștefania	Zannidache (1-0)	Alex	14th Eliminated; Day 86
46-48	April 30– May 2, 2024	Zannidache, TJ Miles	None	Sorin	TJ Miles (5-3)	Ana	Evacuated; Day 89
46-48	April 30– May 2, 2024	Zannidache, Iancu, Robert, Sorin	None	Sorin	Zannidache (1-0)	Zannidache	Exiled; Day 89 (Note: On Days 89 and 92, the Los bandidos tribe voted to send a tribemate to Exile Beach. On Day 92 the two exiled castaways dueled, with the winner returning to the tribe and the loser being officially eliminated form the game. Zannidache and Ștefi were exiled. Zannidache won the duel, officially eliminating Ștefi.)
46-48	April 30– May 2, 2024	Sorin, Robert, Ștefi, Zannidache	None	Sorin	Zannidache (1-0)	Zannidache	Exiled; Day 89
49-51	May 7– May 9, 2024	Iancu, Ștefi	None	Andrei	Ștefi (5-2)	Ștefi	Exiled; Day 92
49-51	May 7– May 9, 2024	Iancu, Andrei, Ștefania	None	Andrei	TJ Miles (1-0)	Ștefi	Exiled; Day 92
49-51	May 7– May 9, 2024	Ștefi, Sorin, TJ Miles	None	Andrei	Ștefi, Zannidache	Ștefi	15th Eliminated; Day 92
52-54	May 14 – 16, 2024	Zannidache, TJ Miles	None	TJ Miles	Zannidache (5-1-1)	Ștefania	16th Eliminated; Day 96
52-54	May 14 – 16, 2024	Zannidache, Iancu, Sorin, Ștefania	None	TJ Miles	Ștefania (1-0)	Ștefania	16th Eliminated; Day 96
52-54	May 14 – 16, 2024	TJ Miles; Andrei, Iancu, Zannidache	None	TJ Miles	Ștefania (1-0)	Ștefania	16th Eliminated; Day 96
55-57	May 21 – 23, 2024	Zannidache, Robert	None	Iancu	Zannidache (3-2-1)	TJ Miles	17th Eliminated; Day 100
55-57	May 21 – 23, 2024	Zannidache; Iancu, TJ Miles	None	Iancu	TJ Miles (1-0)	TJ Miles	17th Eliminated; Day 100
55-57	May 21 – 23, 2024	Iancu, TJ Miles, Zannidache	None	Iancu	TJ Miles (1-0)	TJ Miles	17th Eliminated; Day 100
58–60	May 28–30, 2024	None	None	Zannidache, Iancu, Andrei	Robert, Sorin (No vote) (Note: No vote; Since Sorin and Robert were the only castaways without immunity, they were nominated by default.)	Robert	18th Eliminated; Day 101
58–60	May 28–30, 2024	None	None	Zannidache, Iancu	Andrei, Sorin (No vote) (Note: No vote; Since Andrei and Sorin were the only castaways without immunity, they were nominated by default.)	Sorin	19th Eliminated; Day 102
58–60	May 28–30, 2024	None	None	Zannidache	Andrei, Iancu (No vote) (Note: No vote; Since Andrei and Iancu were the only castaways without immunity, they were nominated by default.)	Andrei	20th Eliminated; Day 103
58–60	May 28–30, 2024	Public vote				Public vote	
58–60	May 28–30, 2024	Public vote				Iancu	Runner-up
58–60	May 28–30, 2024	Public vote				Zannidache	Sole Survivor

== Voting history ==
	Original tribes																First swapped tribes																							Second swapped tribes			No tribe	Merged tribe																											
Week #	1			2			3			4				5			6			7				8				9			10			11			12			13			14				15			16				17				18			19			20							
Episode #	3			6			9			12				15			18			21				24				27			30			33			36			39			40	42			45			48				51				54			57			58		59		60			
Eliminated	Nomination vote		Andreea	Nomination vote		Elena I.	Nomination vote		Relu	Roxana	Nomination vote		Elena M.	Nomination vote		None (Note: Instead of nominate two players, Faimoșii unknowingly voted for two players to become the leaders. Jorge and Jador became leaders and had the responsibility of forming new tribes.)	Nomination vote		Maria L.	Jador	Nomination vote		Moroșanu	Jorge	Nomination vote		Zmărăndescu	Nomination vote		Oana	Nomination vote		Maria C.	Nomination vote		Alexandra C.	Nomination vote		None (Note: Andrei lost the duel against Ana Maria, but instead of being eliminated from the game, he was sent to the Răboinicii tribe.)	Nomination vote		Lola	Ana Maria	Nomination vote		Alexandra D.	Nomination vote		Alex	Ana	Nomination vote		Zannidache	Nomination vote		Ștefi	Ștefi	Nomination vote		Ștefania	Nomination vote		TJ Miles	Nomination vote	Robert	Nomination vote	Sorin	Nomination vote	Andrei	Iancu	Zannidache
Nominated	Andreea	Roxana		Roxana	Elena I.		Maria L.	Relu			Jorge	Elena M.		Jorge	Jador		Alexandra C.	Maria L.			Zmărăndescu	Moroșanu			Zmărăndescu	Zannidache		Lola	Oana		Alexandra D.	Maria C.		Ana	Alexandra C.		Ana Maria	Andrei		Andrei	Lola			Ana	Alexandra D.		Alex, Andrei, Robert, Sorin	Zannidache			TJ Miles	Zannidache		Ștefi	TJ Miles			Zannidache	Ștefania		Zannidache	TJ Miles		Robert, Sorin		Andrei, Sorin		Andrei, Iancu			
Vote	9-1	1-0 (Note: The winner of the Individual Immunity had to directly nominate a member of the tribe.)	Duel	9-2	1-0	Duel	9-3	1-0	Duel	No vote (Note: No vote; Roxana was medically evacuated. No vote occurred for her removal.)	8-1	1-0	Duel	7-1	1-0	Duel	7-2-1	1-0	Duel	No vote (Note: No vote; Jador was ejected from the game. No vote occurred for his removal.)	7-1	1-0	Duel	No vote (Note: No vote; Jorge was medically evacuated. No vote occurred for his removal.)	7-1	1-0	Duel	8-1	1-0	Duel	1-0 (Note: Zannidache played a hidden immunity idol on Lola, therefore seven votes against her were not counted.)	1-0	Duel	2-1-0 (Note: Iancu played a hidden immunity idol on Ana Maria, therefore four votes against her were not counted.)	1-0	Duel	5-1	1-0	Duel	6-2	1-0	Duel	Challenge (Note: Challenge; The castaway who finished last in the Pre-merged challenge would be eliminated from the game. Ana Maria came in last and was eliminated.)	7-3-1	1-0	Duel	1-1-1-1-0 (Note: Zannidache played a hidden immunity idol on Ștefi, therefore six votes against her were not counted.)	1-0	Duel	No vote (Note: No vote; Ana was medically evacuated. No vote occurred for her removal.)	5-3	1-0	Duel	5-2	1-0	Duel	Duel (Note: On Weeks 16 and 17, the Los bandidos tribe voted to send a tribemate to Exile Beach. On Day 99 the two exiled castaways dueled, with the winner returning to the tribe and the loser being officially eliminated form the game. Zannidache and Ștefi were exiled. Zannidache won the duel, officially eliminating Ștefi.)	5-1-1	1-0	Duel	3-2-1	1-0	Duel	No vote (Note: No vote; Since Sorin and Robert were the only castaways without immunity, they were nominated by default.)	Duel	No vote (Note: No vote; Since Andrei and Robert were the only castaways without immunity, they were nominated by default.)	Duel	Public vote			
Voter	Vote																																																																						
Zannidache	Andreea	—N/a	―	Roxana	—N/a	―	―			―	Jorge	—N/a	―	Jorge	—N/a	―	Alexandra C.	—N/a	―	―	Zmărăndescu	Moroșanu	―	―	Zmărăndescu	—N/a	Won	―			―			Alexandra C.	—N/a	―	Ana Maria	—N/a	―	―			―	Alexandra D.	—N/a	―	Alex	—N/a	Won	―	Andrei	—N/a	Exiled				Returned	Andrei	Nominated	Won	Sorin	Nominated	Won	Saved		Saved		Saved		Sole Survivor	
Iancu	―			―			Maria L.	—N/a	―	―	―			―			―			―	―			―	―			Lola	—N/a	―	~~Lola~~	—N/a	―	―			―			Lola	Lola	―	―	Ana	—N/a	―	~~Ștefi~~	—N/a	―	―	TJ Miles	—N/a	―	Ștefi	—N/a	—		Zannidache	—N/a	—	TJ Miles	TJ Miles	—	Saved		Saved		Nominated	Won	Runner-up	
Andrei	―			―			Maria L.	—N/a	―	―	―			―			Alexandra C.	—N/a	―	―	Zmărăndescu	—N/a	―	―	Zmărăndescu	—N/a	―	―			―			Ana	—N/a	―	Ana Maria	—N/a	Swapped	Lola	Nominated	Won	―	Ana	—N/a	―	~~Ștefi~~	Nominated	Won	―	TJ Miles	—N/a	―	Ștefi	TJ Miles	—		Zannidache	—N/a	—	Zannidache	—N/a	—	Saved		Nominated	Won	Nominated	Eliminated		
Sorin	Not in Game			―			Maria L.	Relu	―	―	―			―			―			―	―			―	―			Lola	—N/a	―	~~Lola~~	Maria C.	―	―			―			Andrei	—N/a	―	―	Ana	—N/a	―	~~Ștefi~~	Nominated	Won	―	TJ Miles	Zannidache	―	Ștefi	—N/a	—		Zannidache	—N/a	—	Zannidache	—N/a	—	Nominated	Won	Nominated	Eliminated				
Robert	―			―			Maria L.	—N/a	―	―	―			―			―			―	―			―	―			Lola	—N/a	―	~~Lola~~	—N/a	―	―			―			Andrei	—N/a	―	―	Ana	—N/a	―	~~Ștefi~~	Nominated	Won	―	TJ Miles	—N/a	―	Ștefi	—N/a	—		Zannidache	—N/a	—	Zannidache	—N/a	—	Nominated	Eliminated						
TJ Miles	Andreea	Roxana	―	Roxana	—N/a	―	―			―	Jorge	—N/a	―	Jorge	Jador	―	Alexandra C.	—N/a	―	―	Zmărăndescu	—N/a	―	―	Zmărăndescu	Zannidache	―	―			―			~~Ana Maria~~	—N/a	―	Ana Maria	—N/a	―	―			―	Alexandra D.	Alexandra D.	―	Andrei	—N/a	—	―	Andrei	Nominated	Won	Iancu	—N/a	Won	—	Ștefania	Ștefania	—	Sorin	—N/a	Eliminated								
Ștefania	―			―			Maria L.	—N/a	―	―	―			―			―			―	―			―	―			Lola	Oana	―	~~Lola~~	—N/a	―	―			―			Andrei	—N/a	―	―	Ana	—N/a	―	~~Ștefi~~	Zannidache	—	―	TJ Miles	—N/a	―	Ștefi	—N/a	—		Zannidache	—N/a	Eliminated											
Ștefi	Andreea	—N/a	―	Roxana	—N/a	―	―			―	Jorge	—N/a	―	Jorge	—N/a	―	Alexandra C.	—N/a	―	―	Zmărăndescu	—N/a	―	―	Zmărăndescu	—N/a	―	―			―			~~Ana Maria~~	Alexandra C.	―	Ana Maria	Andrei	―	―			―	Sorin	—N/a	―	Sorin	—N/a	—	―	Andrei	—N/a	―	Iancu	Nominated	Exiled	Eliminated														
Ana	Andreea	—N/a	―	Roxana	—N/a	―	―			―	Jorge	—N/a	―	Jorge	—N/a	―	Alexandra C.	Maria L.	―	―	Zmărăndescu	—N/a	―	―	Zmărăndescu	—N/a	―	―			―			~~Ana Maria~~	Nominated	Won	Ana Maria	—N/a	―	―			―	Alexandra D.	Nominated	Won	Robert	—N/a	—	Evacuated																					
Alex	―			―			Maria L.	—N/a	―	―	―			―			―			―	―			―	―			Lola	—N/a	―	~~Lola~~	—N/a	―	―			―			Andrei	—N/a	―	―	Ana	—N/a	―	~~Ștefi~~	Nominated	Eliminated																						
Alexandra D.	―			―			Relu	—N/a	―	―	―			―			―			―	―			―	―			Lola	—N/a	―	~~Lola~~	Nominated	Won	―			―			Andrei	—N/a	―	―	Ana	—N/a	Eliminated																									
Ana Maria	Not in Game																							―	Zmărăndescu	Exempt (Note: Exempt; As new castaways, Ana Maria was exempt from the nomination process)	―	―			―			Ana	—N/a	―	Ana	Nominated	Won	―			Eliminated																												
Lola	―			―			Maria L.	—N/a	―	―	―			―			―			―	―			―	―			Oana	Nominated	Won	Alexandra D.	—N/a	―	―			―			Andrei	—N/a	Eliminated																													
Alexandra C.	Not in Game			―			Maria L.	—N/a	―	―	―			―			Maria L.	Nominated	Won	―	Zmărăndescu	—N/a	―	―	Zmărăndescu	—N/a	―	―			―			~~Ana Maria~~	—N/a	Eliminated																																			
Maria C.	―			―			Relu	—N/a	―	―	―			―			―			―	―			―	―			Lola	—N/a	―	~~Lola~~	—N/a	Eliminated																																						
Oana	Not in Game																							―	―			Lola	—N/a	Eliminated																																									
Zmărăndescu	Not in Game			Roxana	Exempt (Note: Exempt; As new castaways, Elena M. and Zmărăndescu were exempt from the nomination process)	―	―			―	Jorge	—N/a	―	Jorge	—N/a	―	Alexandra C.	—N/a	―	―	Moroșanu	Nominated	Won	―	Zannidache	Nominated	Eliminated																																												
Jorge	Andreea	—N/a	―	Roxana	Elena I.	―	―			―	Elena M.	Nominated	Won	Zmărăndescu	Nominated	None	―			―	―			Evacuated																																															
Moroșanu	Andreea	—N/a	―	Elena I.	—N/a	―	―			―	Jorge	—N/a	―	Jorge	—N/a	―	Alexandra C.	—N/a	―	―	Zmărăndescu	—N/a	Eliminated																																																
Jador	Andreea	—N/a	―	Roxana	—N/a	―	―			―	Jorge	Elena M.	―	Jorge	—N/a	None	Maria L.	—N/a	―	Ejected																																																			
Maria L.	―			―			Relu	Nominated	Won	―	―			―			Andrei	—N/a	Eliminated																																																				
Elena M.	Not in Game			Roxana	Exempt	―	―			―	Jorge	—N/a	Eliminated																																																										
Roxana	Andreea	—N/a	Won	Elena I.	Nominated	Won	―			Evacuated																																																													
Relu	―			―			Maria L.	—N/a	Eliminated																																																														
Elena I.	Andreea	—N/a	―	Roxana	—N/a	Eliminated																																																																	
Andreea	Zannidache	Nominated	Eliminated																																																																				
