= Survivor România 2021 =

- Season 2
- Presented by: Daniel Pavel
- No. of days: 185
- No. of castaways: 41
- Winner: Edmond Zannidache
- Runner-up: Andrei Dascălu
- Location: La Romana, Dominican Republic
- No. of episodes: 106

Release
- Original network: Kanal D
- Original release: 9 January – 10 July 2021

Additional information
- Filming dates: 6 January – 10 July 2021

Season chronology
- ← Previous; 2020 Next → 2022

Survivor România 2021 is the second season of Survivor România, a Romanian television series based on the popular reality game show Survivor. The season featured 24 contestants divided into two tribes: "Faimoșii", composed of twelve high-achievers who excelled in their fields, and "Războinicii", composed of twelve everyday Romanians.

The season premiered on 9 January 2021, and concluded on 10 July 2021, where Edmond Zannidache was named the winner over Andrei Dascălu winning the grand prize of 250.000 lei and title of Sole Survivor. It was the second season to air on Kanal D and was filmed in La Romana, Dominican Republic from January to July 2021, lasting over 180 days - the longest Romanian edition of Survivor to date.

This season brought in ratings above the average for the Kanal D station. The first episode, which aired in January, attracted over 2.4 million viewers nationwide. The finale had an audience of over 1.7 million viewers.

== Production ==
This season was officially announced by Kanal D on November 13, 2020, with the applications being open immediately. On 29 December 2020, Dan Cruceru announced he would be stepping down as presenter after one season. Citing his reasons for leaving, Cruceru said flying back and forth to Dominican Republic "conflicted with [his] new projects" On 6 January, it was announced that former television presenter and swimmer Daniel Pavel would be his replacement.

=== Broadcast ===
The show airs on Thursdays, Fridays, Saturdays and Sundays at 8:30 pm.

=== Nomination mechanism and public vote ===
In this season, the nominations for the elimination can be from both tribes in each week. The TV viewers decide who will be eliminated. For the first time in the show, TV viewers can vote for their favourite player. The Most Popular player by the public vote will have immunity and has the chance to nominee another contestant for elimination. In addition, in this season, the public was able to decide the reward that the tribe who wins the Reward Challenge would receive.

== Contestants ==
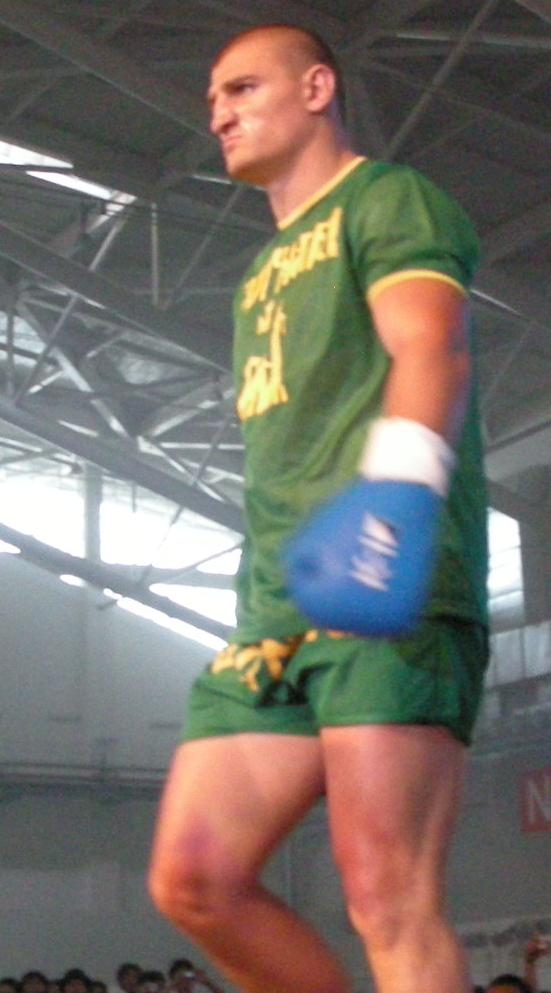
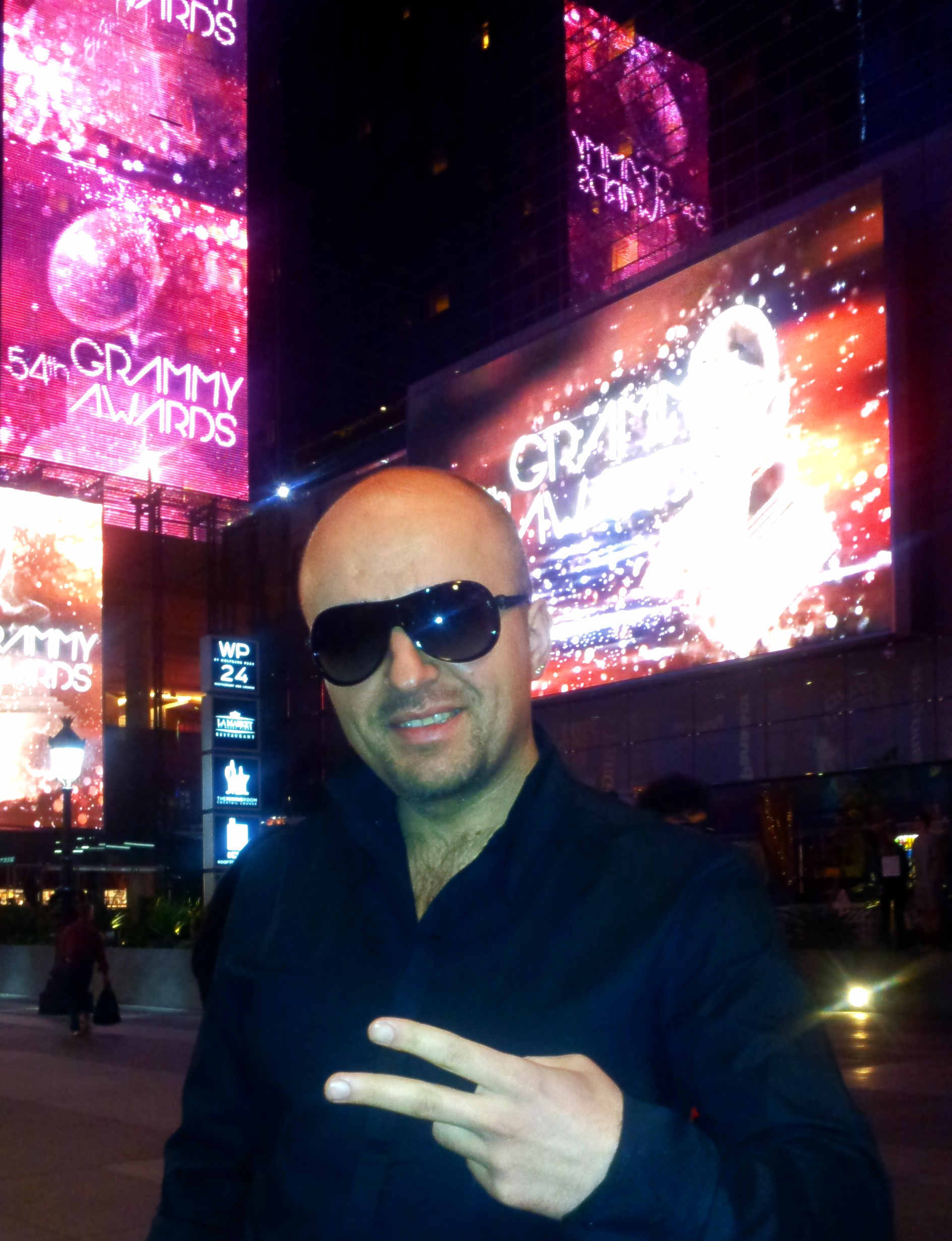
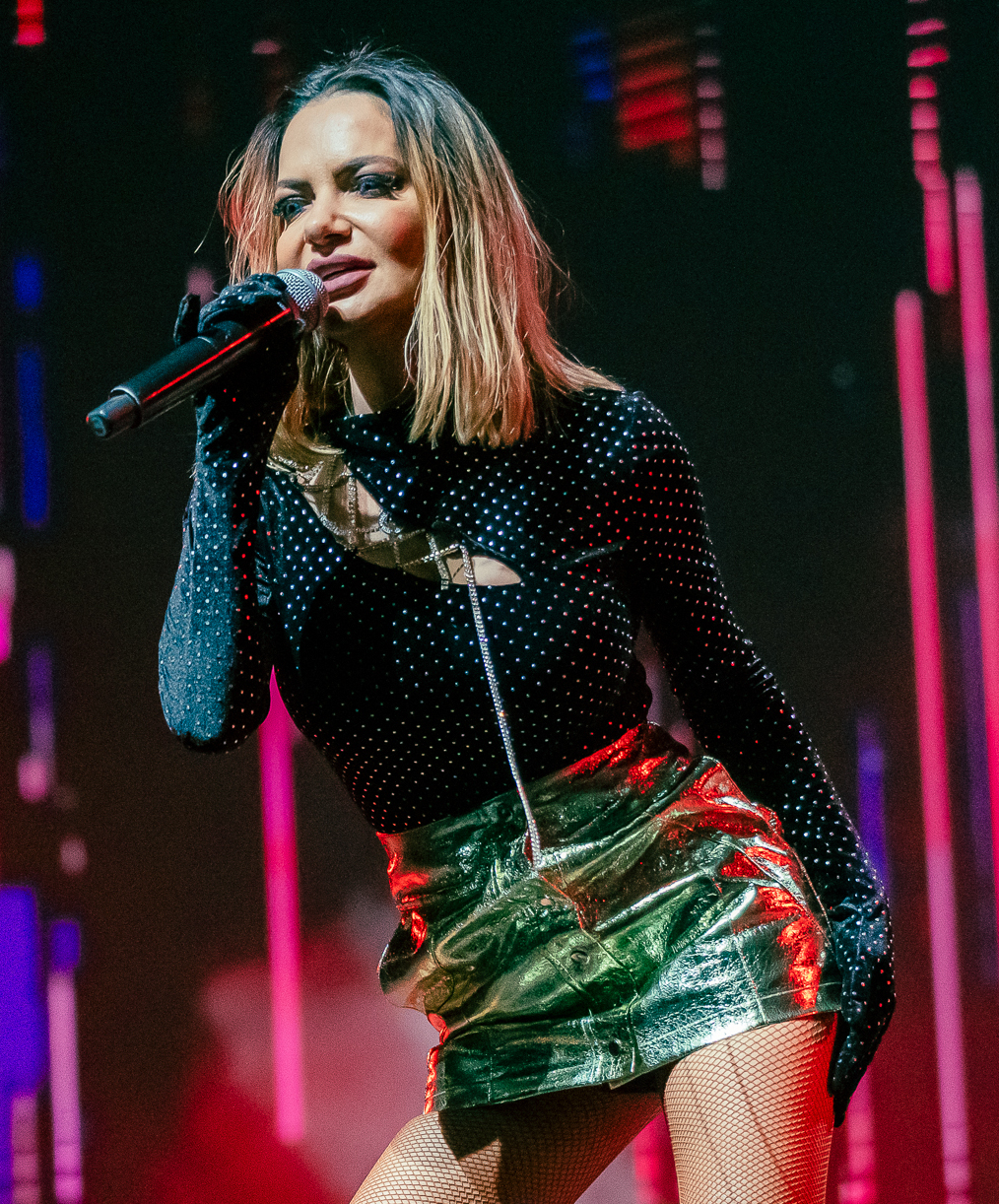
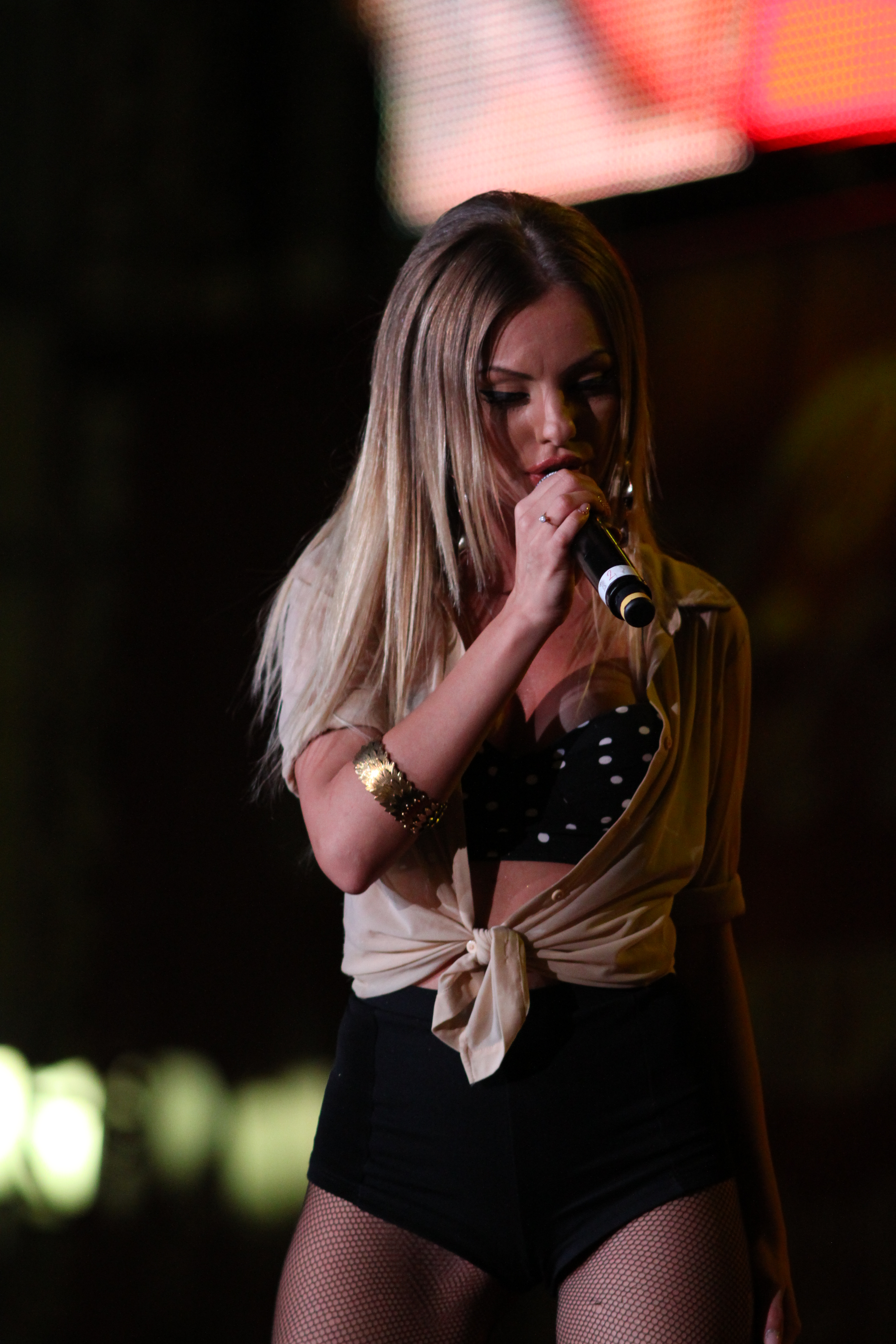
From left to right: Cătălin Moroșanu, Costi Ioniță, Andreea Antonescu and Alexandra Stan.

Faimoșii tribe include a kickboxer, Cătălin Moroșanu, who holds the record for longest winning streak in SUPERKOMBAT history with 17 consecutive wins and international singer-songwriter, Alexandra Stan who made her worldwide breakthrough with the 2010 single "Mr. Saxobeat"

Former artistic gymnast, Ana Porgras and Sindy Szász dropped out before the game began. Porgras was replaced by dancer Elena Marin and Szász by singer Mellina Dumitru. Porgras eventually returned on Day 26 and Szász on Day 48.

During the game, seventeen new contestants joined the remaining original contestants.

On Week 20, the thirteen remaining players merged but despite living on the same beach, tribes would still be split, competing against each other in challenges and fending for themselves, in a similar vein to the One World twist from the American version. The individual phase of the game occurred with 6 players left.

List of Survivor Romania 2021 contestants
Contestant	Age	From	Occupation	Tribe			Finish	
Contestant	Age	From	Occupation	Original	Post-Swap	None	Placement	Day
Lucian Barbu	33	Bacău, Bacău	Swimming teacher	Războinicii	Războinicii		Medically evacuated	Day 9
Cristina Andreea "Amna" Frunzăreanu	36	Slatina, Olt	Dance-pop singer	Faimoșii	Faimoșii		1st Voted Out	Day 9
Costi Ioniță	43	Constanța, Constanța	Record producer	Faimoșii	Faimoșii		2nd Voted Out	Day 16
Andreea Moșneagu	31	Suceava, Suceava	Border police officer	Războinicii	Războinicii		3rd Voted Out	Day 23
Giorgiana Lupu	24	Bacău, Bacău	Athlete	Războinicii	Faimoșii		4th Voted Out	Day 31
Mihaela Berteanu	24	Brașov, Brașov	Guidance counselor		Războinicii		5th Voted Out	Day 38
Marilena Ciucurean	26	Vatra Dornei, Suceava	Fitness instructor	Războinicii	Războinicii		Quit	Day 42
Alexandra Stan	31	Constanța, Constanța	International singer & songwriter	Faimoșii	Faimoșii		Medically evacuated	Day 42
Alin Sălăjean	35	Câmpia Turzii, Cluj	Event presenter	Războinicii	Războinicii		Medically evacuated	Day 43
Simona Hapciuc	31	Bucharest	Actress	Faimoșii	Faimoșii		6th Voted Out	Day 45
Roxana Ghiță	22	Bucharest	Fitness instructor	Războinicii	Războinicii		Medically evacuated	Day 49
Majda Aboulumosha	33	Ploiești, Prahova	Actress	Faimoșii	Faimoșii		7th Voted Out	Day 52
Musty Camara	39	Bucharest	Sound engineer	Războinicii	Războinicii		8th Voted Out	Day 59
Romina Géczi	35	Timișoara, Timiş	Massage therapist		Războinicii		9th Voted Out	Day 66
Andreea Antonescu	38	Galaţi, Galaţi	Singer		Faimoșii		10th Voted Out	Day 73
Roxana Nemeș	31	Târgu Mureș, Mureș	Singer	Faimoșii	Faimoșii		Medically evacuated	Day 80
Maria Hîngu	25	Gologanu, Vrancea	Assistant manager	Războinicii	Războinicii		11th Voted Out	Day 80
Ana Porgras	27	Galați, Galați	Former elite gymnast		Faimoșii		12th Voted Out	Day 87
Mellina Dumitru	34	Bucharest	Singer	Războinicii	Războinicii		13th Voted Out	Day 94
Cătălin Moroșanu	36	Cotnari, Iași	Kickboxer	Faimoșii	Faimoșii		Medically evacuated	Day 98
Vera Miron	34	Brașov, Brașov	Fitness instructor		Războinicii		14th Voted Out	Day 101
Ionuț "Jador" Dumitrache	26	Parincea, Bacău	Manele music singer	Faimoșii	Faimoșii		Medically evacuated	Day 105
Starlin Belén Medina	37	Medgidia, Constanța	Zumba instructor	Războinicii	Războinicii		15th Voted Out	Day 108
Szidónia "Sindy" Szász	26	Braşov, Braşov	Massage technician		Războinicii		16th Voted Out	Day 115
Irina "Irisha" Ceban	33	Chişinău, Moldova	Fashion model		Faimoșii		17th Voted Out	Day 122
Sorin Pușcașu	30	Ploiești, Prahova	Marketing director	Războinicii	Războinicii		Medically evacuated	Day 127
Bogdan Urucu	32	Piteşti, Argeș	Traffic policeman		Războinicii		18th Voted Out	Day 129
Horațiu-Adrian "Cucu" Cuc	27	Topa de Criș, Bihor	Musician and vlogger		Faimoșii		19th Voted Out	Day 136
Culiță Sterp	28	Tuștea, Hunedoara	Manele music singer	Faimoșii	Faimoșii		Quit	Day 141
Andreea Lodbă	25	Iaşi, Iaşi	Actress		Faimoșii		20th Voted out	Day 143
Adelina Damian	28	Galați, Galați	Event singer		Războinicii		21st Voted Out	Day 150
Raluca Dumitru	34	Bucharest	Former TV assistant		Faimoșii		22nd Voted Out	Day 157
Cosmin Stanciu	34	Cluj-Napoca, Cluj	Karate champion	Faimoșii	Faimoșii		Medically evacuated	Day 161
Ştefan Ciuculescu	27	Bucharest	Former footballer		Faimoșii		23rd Voted Out	Day 164
Sebastian Chitoșcă	28	Piatra Neamț, Neamț	Former footballer		Faimoșii		24th Voted Out	Day 171
Albert Oprea	24	Bucharest	Entrepreneur	Războinicii	Războinicii	None (Note: There was no official tribal designation at this point in the game)	25th Voted Out	Day 178
Elena Marin	33	Bucharest	Dancer	Faimoșii	Faimoșii	None	26th Voted Out	Day 183
Maria Chițu	20	Câmpina, Prahova	Student		Războinicii	None	27th Voted Out	Day 184
Marius Crăciun	25	Piteşti, Argeș	Marketing manager		Războinicii	None	28th Voted Out	Day 185
Andrei Dascălu	23	Constanța, Constanța	Boxer		Războinicii	None	Runner-Up	Day 185
Edmond Zannidache	22	Bucharest	Trapper	Faimoșii	Faimoșii	None	Sole Survivor	Day 185

=== Future appearances ===
Marilena Cuciurean, Alin Sălăjean, Simona Hapciuc, Roxana Ghiță, Musty Camara, Majda Aboulumosha, Roxana Nemeș, Maria Hîngu, Ana Porgras, Mellina Dumitru, Cătălin Moroșanu, Ionuț "Jador" Dumitrache, Starlin Belén Medina, Irina "Irisha" Ceban, Sorin Pușcașu, Bogdan Urucu, Culiță Sterp, Cosmin Stanciu, Ștefan Ciuculescu, Sebastian Chitoșcă, Albert Oprea, Elena Marin, Marius Crăciun, Andrei Dascălu, Maria Chițu and Edmond Zannidache competed on Survivor România All Stars. Zannidache returned on Season 4 to serve as a mentor alongside Alex Delea, Elena Chiriac and Oana Ciocan.

== Season summary ==
Challenge winners and eliminations by cycle
Episode(s)		Challenge winner(s)			Nominated (vote)	Eliminated (public vote)	Finish
No.	Original air date	Reward	Tribal immunity	Player of the Week (public vote)	Nominated (vote)	Eliminated (public vote)	Finish
1-7	January 9–10, 2021; January 13–17, 2021	Războinicii	Faimoșii	Roxana G.	Sorin (3-2-2-2-1-1)	Lucian	Evacuated; Day 9
1-7	January 9–10, 2021; January 13–17, 2021	Războinicii	Faimoșii	Roxana G.	Sorin (3-2-2-2-1-1)	Lucian	Evacuated; Day 9
1-7	January 9–10, 2021; January 13–17, 2021	Războinicii	Faimoșii	Roxana G.	Alin (1-0)	Lucian	Evacuated; Day 9
1-7	January 9–10, 2021; January 13–17, 2021	Faimoșii	Războinicii	Jador	Amna (12-1)	Amna	1st voted out Day 9
1-7	January 9–10, 2021; January 13–17, 2021	Războinicii	Războinicii	Jador	Alexandra (1-0)	Amna	1st voted out Day 9
8-11	January 21–24, 2021	Războinicii	Războinicii	Zannidache	Roxana N. (8-2-1)	Costi	2nd voted out Day 16
8-11	January 21–24, 2021	Războinicii (Note: Mini game)	Războinicii	Zannidache	Costi (5-3-2-2)	Costi	2nd voted out Day 16
8-11	January 21–24, 2021	Faimoșii	Războinicii	Zannidache	Alexandra (1-0)	Costi	2nd voted out Day 16
12-15	January 28–31, 2021	Războinicii	Faimoșii	Sorin	Andreea M. (8-1-1)	Andreea M.	3rd voted out Day 23
12-15	January 28–31, 2021	Războinicii	Faimoșii	Sorin	Marilena (4-2-2-1-1)	Andreea M.	3rd voted out Day 23
12-15	January 28–31, 2021	Războinicii	Faimoșii	Sorin	Alin (1-0)	Andreea M.	3rd voted out Day 23
16-19	February 4–7, 2021	Faimoșii	Faimoșii	Roxana G. [Andrei, Mihaela] (Note: As new castaways, Ana, Andrei, Mihaela and Sebastian were exempt from the nomination process.)	Musty (3-2-2-1)	Giorgiana	4th voted out Day 31
16-19	February 4–7, 2021	Faimoșii	Faimoșii	Roxana G. [Andrei, Mihaela]	Alexandra (8-1-1-1)	Giorgiana	4th voted out Day 31
16-19	February 4–7, 2021	Războinicii	Războinicii	Jador [Ana, Sebastian]	Marilena (1-0)	Giorgiana	4th voted out Day 31
16-19	February 4–7, 2021	Războinicii	Războinicii	Jador [Ana, Sebastian]	Giorgiana (1-0)	Giorgiana	4th voted out Day 31
20-23	February 11–14, 2021	Faimoșii	Faimoșii	Marilena, Alin, Sorin	Marilena (9-1)	Mihaela	5th voted out Day 38
20-23	February 11–14, 2021	Faimoșii	Faimoșii	Marilena, Alin, Sorin	Alin (9-1)	Mihaela	5th voted out Day 38
20-23	February 11–14, 2021	Faimoșii	Faimoșii	Marilena, Alin, Sorin	Mihaela, Musty, Albert (1-1-1-0)	Mihaela	5th voted out Day 38
24-27	February 18–21, 2021	Faimoșii	Războinicii	Jador	Roxana N. (6-4-1)	Marilena	Quit; Day 39
24-27	February 18–21, 2021	Faimoșii	Războinicii	Jador	Roxana N. (6-4-1)	Alexandra	Evacuated; Day 40
24-27	February 18–21, 2021	Faimoșii	Războinicii	Jador	Simona (5-3-1-1)	Alin	Evacuated; Day 42
24-27	February 18–21, 2021	Faimoșii	Războinicii	Jador	Majda (1-0)	Simona	6th voted out Day 45
28-31	February 25–28, 2021	Războinicii	Războinicii	Jador [Andreea A.] (Note: As new castawaya, Andreea A. was exempt from the nomination process.)	Roxana N. (9-1-1)	Roxana G.	Evacuated; Day 49
28-31	February 25–28, 2021	Faimoșii	Războinicii	Jador [Andreea A.]	Elena (5-2-2-1)	Majda	7th voted out Day 52
28-31	February 25–28, 2021	Războinicii	Războinicii	Jador [Andreea A.]	Majda (1-0)	Majda	7th voted out Day 52
32-35	March 4–7, 2021	Faimoșii	Războinicii	Elena	Andreea A. (6-1-1-1)	Musty	8th voted out Day 59
32-35	March 4–7, 2021	Războinicii	Războinicii	Elena	Albert (6-4)	Musty	8th voted out Day 59
32-35	March 4–7, 2021	Războinicii	Faimoșii	Albert, Marius	Zannidache (1-0)	Musty	8th voted out Day 59
32-35	March 4–7, 2021	Războinicii	Faimoșii	Albert, Marius	Musty, Maria H. (1-1-0)	Musty	8th voted out Day 59
36-39	March 11–14, 2021	Războinicii	Faimoșii	Albert, Andrei	Albert (8-1)	Romina	9th voted out Day 66
36-39	March 11–14, 2021	Faimoșii	Faimoșii	Albert, Andrei	Andreea A. (7-2)	Romina	9th voted out Day 66
36-39	March 11–14, 2021	Războinicii	Războinicii	Elena	Sorin, Romina (1-1-0)	Romina	9th voted out Day 66
36-39	March 11–14, 2021	Războinicii	Războinicii	Elena	Sebastian (1-0)	Romina	9th voted out Day 66
40-43	March 18–21, 2021	Faimoșii	Războinicii	Elena	Andreea A. (4-2-1)	Andreea A.	10th voted out Day 73
40-43	March 18–21, 2021	Războinicii	Războinicii	Elena	Albert, Sorin (4-4)	Andreea A.	10th voted out Day 73
40-43	March 18–21, 2021	Faimoșii	Faimoșii	Albert, Sindy	Sebastian (1-0)	Andreea A.	10th voted out Day 73
40-43	March 18–21, 2021	Faimoșii	Faimoșii	Albert, Sindy	Maria H., Mellina (1-1-0)	Andreea A.	10th voted out Day 73
44-47	March 25–28, 2021	Războinicii	Faimoșii	Albert, Marius, Sorin	Marius (4-3-1)	Roxana N.	Evacuated; Day 80
44-47	March 25–28, 2021	Războinicii	Faimoșii	Albert, Marius, Sorin	Albert, Maria H. (4-4)	Roxana N.	Evacuated; Day 80
44-47	March 25–28, 2021	Faimoșii	Faimoșii	Albert, Marius, Sorin	Mellina, Starlin, Sindy (1-1-1-0)	Maria H.	11th voted out Day 80
48-51	April 1–4, 2021	Faimoșii	Faimoșii	Albert	Mellina (6-1)	Ana	12th voted out Day 87
48-51	April 1–4, 2021	Faimoșii	Faimoșii	Albert	Sebastian (4-1-1-1-1)	Ana	12th voted out Day 87
48-51	April 1–4, 2021	Faimoșii	Războinicii	Jador	Marius (1-0)	Ana	12th voted out Day 87
48-51	April 1–4, 2021	Faimoșii	Războinicii	Jador	Ana (1-0)	Ana	12th voted out Day 87
52-55	April 8–11, 2021	Războinicii	Faimoșii	Albert [Maria C., Vera] (Note: As new castaways, Maria C., Irisha, Raluca and Vera were exempt from the nomination process.)	Mellina (5-1-1)	Mellina	13th voted out Day 94
52-55	April 8–11, 2021	Faimoșii	Faimoșii	Albert [Maria C., Vera]	Jador (2-1-1-1-1)	Mellina	13th voted out Day 94
52-55	April 8–11, 2021	Războinicii	Războinicii	Zannidache [Irisha, Raluca]	Sorin (1-0)	Mellina	13th voted out Day 94
52-55	April 8–11, 2021	Faimoșii	Războinicii	Zannidache [Irisha, Raluca]	Elena (1-0)	Mellina	13th voted out Day 94
56-59	April 15–18, 2021	Faimoșii	Războinicii	Albert, Marius	Irisha (4-2-1)	Cătălin	Evacuated; Day 95
56-59	April 15–18, 2021	Faimoșii	Războinicii	Albert, Marius	Albert (6-2)	Cătălin	Evacuated; Day 95
56-59	April 15–18, 2021	Războinicii	Faimoșii	Zannidache	Vera, Maria C. (1-1-0)	Vera	14th voted out Day 101
56-59	April 15–18, 2021	Războinicii	Faimoșii	Zannidache	Elena (1-0)	Vera	14th voted out Day 101
60-63	April 22–25, 2021	Faimoșii	Faimoșii	Albert, Marius [Adelina, Maria C., Sindy]	Albert (4-2)	Jador	Evacuated; Day 104
60-63	April 22–25, 2021	Faimoșii	Faimoșii	Albert, Marius [Adelina, Maria C., Sindy]	Sorin (5-1)	Jador	Evacuated; Day 104
60-63	April 22–25, 2021	Războinicii	Faimoșii	Albert, Marius [Adelina, Maria C., Sindy]	Starlin, Andrei (1-1-0)	Starlin	15th voted out Day 108
64-67	April 29 - May 2, 2021	Războinicii	Faimoșii	Albert, Maria C., Andrei, Sorin [Bogdan, Adelina] (Note: As new castaways, Adelina and Bogdan were exempt from the nomination process.)	Albert (4-2)	Sindy	16th voted out Day 115
64-67	April 29 - May 2, 2021	Draw (Note: Each tribe earned food for their survival; while there was no designated winner, both teams earned the same amount of food.)	Faimoșii	Albert, Maria C., Andrei, Sorin [Bogdan, Adelina]	Maria C. (4-1)	Sindy	16th voted out Day 115
64-67	April 29 - May 2, 2021	Războinicii	Faimoșii	Albert, Maria C., Andrei, Sorin [Bogdan, Adelina]	Marius, Sindy (No vote) (Note: No vote; Since Mariu and Sindy were the only castaways without immunity, they were nominated by default.)	Sindy	16th voted out Day 115
68-71	May 6–9, 2021	Faimoșii	Războinicii	Zannidache	Irisha (6-4)	Irisha	17th voted out Day 122
68-71	May 6–9, 2021	Războinicii	Războinicii	Zannidache	Albert (5-1-1)	Irisha	17th voted out Day 122
68-71	May 6–9, 2021	Faimoșii	Faimoșii	Albert, Marius	Elena (1-0)	Irisha	17th voted out Day 122
68-71	May 6–9, 2021	Faimoșii	Faimoșii	Albert, Marius	Sorin, Bogdan (1-1-0)	Irisha	17th voted out Day 122
72-75	May 13–16, 2021	Războinicii	Războinicii	Ștefan, Zannidache [Andreea L., Elena, Raluca]	Sebastian, Ștefan (4-4-1)	Sorin	Evacuated; Day 127
72-75	May 13–16, 2021	Draw (Note: Each tribe earned food for their survival; while there was no designated winner, both teams earned the same amount of food.)	Războinicii	Ștefan, Zannidache [Andreea L., Elena, Raluca]	Bogdan (5-1)	Sorin	Evacuated; Day 127
72-75	May 13–16, 2021	Faimoșii	Faimoșii	Albert	Cosmin, Cucu (1-1-0)	Bogdan	18th Voted Out; Day 129
72-75	May 13–16, 2021	Faimoșii	Faimoșii	Albert	Adelina (1-0)	Bogdan	18th Voted Out; Day 129
76-79	May 20–23, 2021	Războinicii	Războinicii	Zannidache [Andreea L., Elena, Raluca]	Sebastian (5-2-1-1)	Cucu	19th voted out Day 136
76-79	May 20–23, 2021	Faimoșii	Războinicii	Zannidache [Andreea L., Elena, Raluca]	Culiță (6-2-1)	Cucu	19th voted out Day 136
76-79	May 20–23, 2021	Războinicii	Războinicii	Zannidache [Andreea L., Elena, Raluca]	Cucu (1-0)	Cucu	19th voted out Day 136
80-83	May 27–30, 2021	Faimoșii	Războinicii	Zannidache	Andreea L. (4-2-1)	Culiță	Quit; Day 141
80-83	May 27–30, 2021	Războinicii	Războinicii	Zannidache	Adelina (4-1)	Culiță	Quit; Day 141
80-83	May 27–30, 2021	Faimoșii	Faimoșii	Albert	Ștefan (1-0)	Andreea L.	20th voted out Day 143
80-83	May 27–30, 2021	Faimoșii	Faimoșii	Albert	Marius (1-0)	Andreea L.	20th voted out Day 143
84-87	June 3–6, 2021	Faimoșii	Faimoșii	Andrei	Adelina (4-1)	Adelina	21st voted out Day 150
84-87	June 3–6, 2021	Războinicii	Faimoșii	Andrei	Maria C. (4-1)	Adelina	21st voted out Day 150
84-87	June 3–6, 2021	Războinicii	Faimoșii	Andrei	Albert (1-0)	Adelina	21st voted out Day 150
88-91	June 10–13, 2021	Războinicii	Faimoșii	Albert, Maria C.	Albert (3-1)	Raluca	22nd voted out Day 157
88-91	June 10–13, 2021	Războinicii	Faimoșii	Albert, Maria C.	Ștefan (3-1-1)	Raluca	22nd voted out Day 157
88-91	June 10–13, 2021	Faimoșii	Războinicii	Elena	Andrei, Marius (No vote)^{8}	Raluca	22nd voted out Day 157
88-91	June 10–13, 2021	Faimoșii	Războinicii	Elena	Raluca (1-0)	Raluca	22nd voted out Day 157
92-95	June 17–20, 2021	Războinicii	Războinicii	Zannidache	Elena (3-1)	Cosmin	Evacuated; Day 161
92-95	June 17–20, 2021	Războinicii	Războinicii	Zannidache	Albert (3-1)	Cosmin	Evacuated; Day 161
92-95	June 17–20, 2021	Faimoșii	Faimoșii	Andrei	Ștefan (1-0)	Ștefan	23rd voted out Day 164
92-95	June 17–20, 2021	Faimoșii	Faimoșii	Andrei	Maria C. (1-0)	Ștefan	23rd voted out Day 164
96-99	June 24–27, 2021	Războinicii	Războinicii	Zannidache	Sebastian (2-1)	Sebastian	24th voted out Day 171
96-99	June 24–27, 2021	Andrei [Marius]	Războinicii	Zannidache	Sebastian (2-1)	Sebastian	24th voted out Day 171
96-99	June 24–27, 2021	Războinicii	Războinicii	Zannidache	Elena (2-1)	Sebastian	24th voted out Day 171
100-103	July 1–4, 2021	Zannidache [Albert, Elena]	None	Marius	Elena (1-0)	Albert	25th voted out Day 178
100-103	July 1–4, 2021	Zannidache [Albert, Elena]	None	Elena	Marius (1-0)	Albert	25th voted out Day 178
100-103	July 1–4, 2021	Zannidache [Albert, Elena]	None	Maria C.	Albert (1-0)	Albert	25th voted out Day 178
104-106	July 8–10, 2021	None	None	Marius, Andrei	Elena, Maria C., Zannidache (No vote) (Note: No vote; Since Elena, Maria C. and Zannidache were the only castaways without immunity, they were nominated by default.)	Elena	26th voted out Day 183
104-106	July 8–10, 2021	None	None	Andrei, Marius	Maria C., Zannidache (No vote) (Note: No vote; Since Maria C. and Zannidache were the only castaways without immunity, they were nominated by default.)	Maria C.	27th voted out Day 184
104-106	July 8–10, 2021	None	None	Andrei	Marius, Zannidache (No vote) (Note: No vote; Since Marius and Zannidache were the only castaways without immunity, they were nominated by default.)	Marius	28th voted out Day 185
104-106	July 8–10, 2021	Public vote				Public vote	
104-106	July 8–10, 2021	Public vote				Andrei	Runner-up
104-106	July 8–10, 2021	Public vote				Zannidache	Sole Survivor

== Voting history ==
	Original tribes	Post-Swap tribes																																																																No tribes																																																																	
Week #	1						2				3				4					5				6							7					8					9					10					11					12					13					14						15					16				17					18						19				20						21				22					23						24			25				26							
Episode #	5	6	7				9	10	11		13	14	15		17	18	19			21	22	23		24		25		26	27		29		30	31		33	34	35			37	38	39			41	42	43			45	46	47			49	50	51			53	54	55			56	57	58	59			60	61	62	63		65	66	67		69	70	71			73	74		75			77	78	79		81		82	83			85	86	87		89	90	91			92	93	94	95			97	98	99	101	102	103		104		105		106			
Voted Out	Nomination vote				Lucian	Amna	Nomination vote			Costi	Nomination vote			Andreea M.	Nomination vote				Giorgiana	Nomination vote			Mihaela	Marilena	Alexandra	Alin	Nomination vote			Simona	Roxana G.	Nomination vote			Majda	Nomination vote				Musty	Nomination vote				Romina	Nomination vote				Andreea A.	Nomination vote			Roxana N.	Maria H.	Nomination vote				Ana	Nomination vote				Mellina	Cătălin	Nomination vote				Vera	Jador	Nomination vote			Starlin	Nomination vote			Sindy	Nomination vote				Irisha	Nomination vote	Sorin	Nomination vote			Bogdan	Nomination vote			Cucu	Culiță	Nomination vote				Andreea L.	Nomination vote			Adelina	Nomination vote				Raluca	Cosmin	Nomination vote				Ștefan	Nomination vote		Sebastian	Nomination vote			Albert	Nomination vote	Elena	Nomination vote	Maria C.	Nomination vote	Marius	Andrei	Zannidache
Nominated	Sorin	Amna	Alin	Alexandra			Roxana N.	Costi	Alexandra		Andreea M.	Marilena	Alin		Musty	Alexandra	Marilena	Giorgiana		Marilena	Alin	Mihaela, Musty & Albert					Roxana N.	Simona	Majda			Roxana N.	Elena	Majda		Andreea A.	Albert	Zannidache	Musty & Maria H.		Albert	Andreea A.	Sorin & Romina	Sebastian		Andreea A.	Albert & Sorin	Sebastian	Maria H. & Mellina		Marius	Albert & Maria H.	Mellina, Starlin & Sindy			Mellina	Sebastian	Marius	Ana		Mellina	Jador	Sorin	Elena			Irisha	Albert	Elena	Vera & Maria C.			Albert	Sorin	Starlin & Andrei		Albert	Maria C.	Sindy & Marius		Irisha	Albert	Elena	Sorin & Bogdan		Sebastian & Ștefan		Bogdan	Cucu & Cosmin	Adelina		Sebastian	Culiță	Cucu			Andreea L.	Adelina	Ștefan	Marius		Adelina	Maria C.	Albert		Albert	Ștefan	Andrei, Marius	Raluca			Elena	Albert	Ștefan	Maria C.		Sebastian	Elena		Elena	Marius	Albert		Elena, Maria C. & Zannidache		Maria C. & Zannidache		Marius & Zannidache			
Votes	3-2-2-2-1-1	12-1	1-0 (Note: The Most Popular player(s) had to directly nominate a member of the tribe.)	1-0	No vote (Note: No vote; Lucian was medically evacuated from the game due to an injury sustained in the challenge.)	Public vote	8-2-1	5-3-2-2	1-0	Public vote	8-1-1	4-2-2-1-1	1-0	Public vote	3-2-2-1	8-1-1-1	1-0	1-0	Public vote	9-1	9-1	1-1-1-0	Public vote	No vote (Note: No vote; Marilena elected to quit the game. No vote occurred for her removal.)	No vote (Note: No vote; Alexandra was medically evacuated. No vote occurred for her removal.)	No vote (Note: No vote; Alin was medically evacuated. No vote occurred for his removal.)	6-4-1	5-3-1-1	1-0	Public vote	No vote (Note: No vote; Roxana G. was medically evacuated. No vote occurred for her removal.)	9-1-1	5-2-2-1	1-0	Public vote	6-1-1-1	6-4	1-0	1-1-0	Public vote	8-1	7-2	1-1-0	1-0	Public vote	4-2-1	4-4	1-0	1-1-0	Public vote	4-3-1	4-4	1-1-1-0	No vote (Note: No vote; Roxana N. was medically evacuated. No vote occurred for her removal.)	Public vote	6-1	4-1-1-1-1	1-0	1-0	Public vote	5-1-1	2-1-1-1-1	1-0	1-0	Public vote	No vote (Note: No vote; Cătălin was medically evacuated. No vote occurred for his removal.)	4-2-1	6-2	1-0	1-1-0	Public vote	No vote (Note: No vote; Jador was medically evacuated. No vote occurred for his removal.)	4-2	5-1	1-1-0	Public vote	4-2	4-2	No vote (Note: Since Marius and Sindy were the only castaways without immunity, they were nominated by default.)	Public vote	6-4	5-1-1	1-0	1-1-0	Public vote	4-4-1	No vote (Note: No vote; Sorin was medically evacuated. No vote occurred for his removal.)	5-1	1-1-0	1-0	Public vote	5-2-1-1	6-2-1	1-0	Public vote	No vote (Note: No vote; Culiță elected to quit the game. No vote occurred for hir removal.)	4-2-1	4-1	1-0	1-0	Public vote	4-1	4-1	1-0	Public vote	3-1	3-1-1	No vote (Note: Since Andrei and Marius were the only castaways without immunity, they were nominated by default.)	1-0	Public vote	No vote (Note: No vote; Cosmin was medically evacuated. No vote occurred for his removal.)	3-1	3-1	1-0	1-0	Public vote	2-1	2-1	Public vote	1-0 (Note: The winner(s) of the Individual Immunity had to directly nominate a member of the tribe.)	1-0	1-0	Public vote	No vote (Note: No vote; Since Elena, Maria C. and Zannidache were the only castaways without immunity, they were nominated by default.)	Public vote	No vote (Note: No vote; Since Maria C. and Zannidache were the only castaways without immunity, they were nominated by default.)	Public vote	No vote (Note: No vote; Since Marius and Zannidache were the only castaways without immunity, they were nominated by default.)	Public vote	Public vote	
Voter	Vote																																																																																																																																		
Zannidache	—	Amna	—N/a		—	—	Roxana N.	Jador	Alexandra	—	—				—	Alexandra	—N/a		—	—				—	—	—	Roxana N.	Simona	—N/a	—	—	Roxana N.	Elena	—N/a	—	Andreea A.	—	—N/a		Saved	—	Andreea A.	—N/a		—	Cătălin	—	—N/a		—	—				—	—	Jador	—N/a		—	—	Jador	Elena		—	—	Irisha	—	Elena		—	—	—				—				Irisha	—	Elena		—	Ștefan	—	—	Cucu		—	Culiță	Culiță	Cucu	—	—	Andreea L.	—	Ștefan		—	—				—	Ștefan	—N/a		—	—	Elena	—	Ștefan		—	Sebastian	Elena	—	—N/a			—	Nominated	Saved	Nominated	Saved	Nominated	Saved	Sole Survivor	
Andrei	Not in Game														Exempt (Note: Exempt; As new castaways, Ana, Andrei, Mihaela and Sebastian were exempt from the nomination process)					Marilena	Alin	—N/a	—	—	—	—	—				—	—				—	Musty	—N/a		—	Albert	—	Romina		—	—	Sorin	—N/a		—	Sorin	Maria H.	—N/a	—	—	Mellina	—	—N/a		—	Mellina	—	—N/a		—	—	—	Albert	—N/a		—	—	Albert	Sorin	—N/a	Saved	Albert	Maria C.	Passed		—	Albert	—N/a		—	—	—	Bogdan	—N/a		—	—				—	—	Adelina	—N/a		—	Adelina	Maria C.	—N/a	—	Albert	—	Nominated		Saved	—	—	Albert	Maria C.		—	—			—N/a			—	Immune		Immune		Immune		Runner-up	
Marius	Not in Game																														Exempt (Note: Exempt; As new castaways, Andreea A., Marius, Romina, Sindy were exempt from the nomination process)					—	Albert	Maria H.		—	Albert	—	—N/a		—	—	Sorin	—N/a		—	Sorin	Maria H.	Starlin	—	—	Mellina	—	—N/a		Saved	Mellina	—	—N/a		—	—	—	Albert	Maria C.		—	—	Albert	Sorin	Andrei	—	Albert	Maria C.	Nominated	Saved	—	Albert	Bogdan		—	—	—	Bogdan	—N/a		—	—				—	—	Adelina	—N/a		Saved	Adelina	Maria C.	—N/a	—	Albert	—	Nominated		Saved	—	—	Albert	—N/a		—	—			Elena	Nominated		Saved	Immune		Immune		Nominated	Voted Out		
Maria C.	Not in Game																																																												Exempt (Note: Exempt; As new castaways, Maria C., Irisha, Raluca and Vera were exempt from the nomination process)					—	—	Vera	—N/a		Saved	—	Sorin	Sorin	—N/a	—	Sorin	Sorin	Passed		—	Bogdan	—N/a		—	—	—	Bogdan	—N/a		—	—				—	—	Adelina	—N/a		—	Adelina	Albert	Nominated	Saved	Albert	—	Passed			—	—	Albert	—N/a		Saved	—			—N/a		Albert	—	Nominated	Saved	Nominated	Voted Out				
Elena	—	Amna	—N/a		—	—	Roxana N.	Alexandra	—N/a	—	—				—	Alexandra	—N/a		—	—				—	—	—	Zannidache	Cătălin	—N/a	—	—	Roxana N.	Jador	Nominated	Saved	Cătălin	—	Zannidache		—	—	Sebastian	Sebastian		—	Cătălin	—	Sebastian		—	—				—	—	Sebastian	—N/a		—	—	Cosmin	—N/a		Saved	—	Irisha	—	—N/a		Saved	—	—				—				Raluca	—	—N/a		Saved	Sebastian	—	—	—N/a		—	Sebastian	Zannidache	—N/a	—	—	Andreea L.	—	—N/a		—	—				—	Raluca	Raluca		—	—	Ștefan	Nominated			Saved	Sebastian	Zannidache	Saved	—N/a	Marius	Nominated	Saved	Nominated	Voted Out						
Albert	Sorin	—	—N/a		—	—	—				—	Andreea M.	Mellina	—N/a	Musty	—	—N/a		—	Marilena	Alin	—N/a	—	—	—	—	—				—	—				—	Musty	Musty		—	Sorin	—	Sorin		—	—	Sorin	Maria H.		—	Maria H.	Maria H.	Mellina	—	—	Mellina	—	Marius		—	Mellina	—	Sorin		—	—	—	Vera	Vera		—	—	Sorin	Sorin	Starlin	—	Sorin	Sorin	Passed		—	Sorin	Sorin		—	—	—	Bogdan	Adelina		—	—				—	—	Adelina	Marius		—	Adelina	Maria C.	—N/a	Saved	Maria C.	—	Passed			—	—	Marius	Nominated		Saved	—			—N/a			Voted Out								
Sebastian	Not in Game														Exempt					—				—	—	—	Roxana N.	Simona	—N/a	—	—	Roxana N.	Elena	—N/a	—	Andreea A.	—	—N/a		—	—	Andreea A.	—N/a		Saved	Andreea A.	—	—N/a		Saved	—			—	—	—	Cosmin	Nominated		Saved	—	Culiță	—N/a		—	—	Irisha	—	—N/a		—	—	—				—				Irisha	—	—N/a		—	Ștefan	Nominated				Saved	Zannidache	Culiță	Nominated	Saved	—	Andreea L.	—	—N/a		—	—				—	Ștefan	—N/a		—	—	Elena	—	—N/a		—	Elena	Elena	Voted Out												
Ștefan	Not in Game																																																																Exempt (Note: Exempt; As new castaway, Ștefan was exempt from the nomination process)								—				Raluca	—	—N/a		—	Sebastian	—	—	—N/a		—	Sebastian	Culiță	—N/a	—	—	Raluca	—	—N/a		Saved	—				—	Zannidache	Nominated		Saved	—	Elena	—	—N/a		Voted Out																			
Cosmin	—	Amna	—N/a		—	—	Roxana N.	Jador	—N/a	—	—				—	Alexandra	—N/a		—	—				—	—	—	Roxana N.	Simona	—N/a	—	—	Roxana N.	Elena	—N/a	—	Andreea A.	—	—N/a		—	—	Andreea A.	—N/a		—	Cătălin	—	—N/a		—	—			—	—	—	Sebastian	—N/a		—	—	Jador	—N/a		—	—	Irisha	—	—N/a		—	—	—				—				Irisha	—	—N/a		—	Ștefan	—	—	—N/a		Saved	Ștefan	Culiță	—N/a	—	—	Andreea L.	—	—N/a		—	—				—	Sick Day (Note: Sick Day; Due to medical intervention by production, Cosmin did not attend Tribal Council but not be deemed unable to continue with the game. As he could not attend Tribal Council, he could not vote, nor be voted out.)				Evacuated																				
Raluca	Not in Game																																																												Exempt					—	Elena	—	—N/a		—	—	—				—				Irisha	—	—N/a		—	Ștefan	—	—	—N/a		—	Culiță	Culiță	—N/a	—	—	Ștefan	—	—N/a		—	—				—	Ștefan	Nominated		Voted Out																					
Adelina	Not in Game																																																																Exempt (Note: Exempt; As new castaways, Adelina, Andreea l., Bogdan and Cucu were exempt from the nomination process)				—	Albert	—N/a		—	—	—	Bogdan	—N/a		Saved	—			—	—	—	Maria C.	Nominated		Saved	Maria C.	Maria C.	Nominated	Voted Out																																						
Andreea L.	Not in Game																																																																Exempt				Irisha	—	—N/a		—	Culiță	—	—	—N/a		—	Sebastian	Culiță	—N/a	—	—	Ștefan	Nominated			Voted Out																																										
Culiță	—	Amna	—N/a		—	—	Roxana N.	Alexandra	—N/a	—	—				—	Alexandra	—N/a		—	—				—	—	—	Roxana N.	Simona	—N/a	—	—	Roxana N.	Elena	—N/a	—	Andreea A.	—	—N/a		—	—	Andreea A.	—N/a		—	Andreea A.	—N/a		—	—	—			—	—	—	Sebastian	—N/a		—	—	Sebastian	—N/a		—	—	Raluca	—	—N/a		—	—	—				—				Raluca	—	—N/a		—	Sebastian	—	—	—N/a		—	Sebastian	Ștefan	Nominated	Saved	Quit																																			
Cucu	Not in Game																																																																Exempt				Irisha	—	—N/a		—	Sebastian	—	—	—N/a		Saved	Sebastian	Zannidache	—N/a	Voted Out																																																
Bogdan	Not in Game																																																																Exempt				—	Albert	—N/a		Saved	—	—	Marius	Nominated		Voted Out																																																				
Sorin	Andreea M.	Nominated				Saved	—				Andreea M.	Marilena	Alin	—	Alin	—	—N/a		—	Marilena	Alin	Albert	—	—	—	—	—				—	—				—	Albert	—N/a		—	Albert	—	—N/a		Saved	—	Albert	Nominated		Saved	Marius	Albert	Sindy	—	—	Mellina	—	—N/a		—	Mellina	—	—N/a		Saved	—	—	Albert	—N/a		—	—	Albert	Starlin	Nominated	Saved	Albert	Maria C.	Passed		—	Albert	—N/a		Saved	—	Evacuated																																												
Irisha	Not in Game																																																												Exempt					—	Raluca	Nominated			Saved	—	—				—				Raluca	Nominated			Voted Out																																														
Sindy	Not in Game																														Exempt					—	Musty	—N/a		—	Albert	—	—N/a		—	—	Sorin	Mellina		—	Sorin	Maria H.	—N/a	—	Saved	Mellina	—	—N/a		—	Sorin	—	—N/a		—	—	—	Albert	—N/a		—	—	Sick Day (Note: Sick Day; Due to medical intervention by production, Sindy did not attend Tribal Council but not be deemed unable to continue with the game. As she could not attend Tribal Council, she could not vote, nor be voted out.)				Albert	Maria C.	Nominated	Voted Out																																																			
Starlin	Mellina	—	—N/a		—	—	—				Andreea M.	Marilena	—N/a	—	Roxana G.	—	—N/a		—	Marilena	Alin	—N/a	—	—	—	—	—				—	—				—	Albert	—N/a		—	Albert	—	—N/a		—	—	Albert	—N/a		—	Marius	Albert	—N/a	—	Saved	Mellina	—	—N/a		—	Mellina	—	—N/a		—	—	—	Albert	—N/a		—	—	Albert	Sorin	—N/a	Voted Out																																																							
Jador	—	Amna	Alexandra		—	—	Roxana N.	Costi	—N/a	—	—				—	Giorgiana	Giorgiana		—	—				—	—	—	Roxana N.	Simona	Majda	—	—	Roxana N.	Majda	Majda	—	Sick Day (Note: Sick Day; Due to medical intervention by production, Jador did not attend Tribal Council but not be deemed unable to continue with the game. As he could not attend Tribal Council, she could not vote, nor be voted out.)															—			—	—	—	Ana	Ana		—	—	Elena	Nominated		Saved	—	Sick Day (Note: Sick Day; Due to medical intervention by production, Jador did not attend Tribal Council but not be deemed unable to continue with the game. As he could not attend Tribal Council, he could not vote, nor be voted out.)					Evacuated																																																											
Vera	Not in Game																																																												Exempt					—	—	Albert	—N/a		Voted Out																																																												
Cătălin	—	Amna	—N/a		—	—	Alexandra	Giorgiana	—N/a	—	—				—	Alexandra	—N/a		—	—				—	—	—	Sebastian	Elena	—N/a	—	—	Roxana N.	Ana	—N/a	—	Andreea A.	—	—N/a		—	—	Andreea A.	—N/a		—	Andreea A.	—	—N/a		—	—			—	—	—	Sebastian	—N/a		—	Sick Day (Note: Sick Day; Due to medical intervention by production, Cătălin did not attend Tribal Council but not be deemed unable to continue with the game. As he could not attend Tribal Council, he could not vote, nor be voted out.)					Evacuated																																																																	
Mellina	Albert	—	—N/a		—	—	—				Andreea M.	Marilena	—N/a	—	Starlin	—	—N/a		—	Marilena	Alin	—N/a	—	—	—	—	—				—	—				—	Albert	—N/a		—	Albert	—	—N/a		—	—	Albert	—N/a		Saved	Marius	Albert	—N/a	—	Saved	Albert	Nominated			Saved	Albert	Nominated			Voted Out																																																																		
Ana	Not in Game														Exempt					—				—	—	—	Roxana N.	Simona	—N/a	—	—	Majda	Elena	—N/a	—	Andreea A.	—	—N/a		—	—	Andreea A.	—N/a		—	Andreea A.	—	—N/a		—	—			—	—	—	Cătălin	—N/a		Voted Out																																																																							
Maria H.	Alin	—	—N/a		—	—	—				Andreea M.	Marilena	—N/a	—	Starlin	—	—N/a		—	Marilena	Alin	—N/a	—	—	—	—	—				—	—				—	Albert	—N/a		Saved	Albert	—	—N/a		—	—	Albert	—N/a		Saved	Marius	Albert	Nominated		Voted Out																																																																												
Roxana N.	—	Amna	—N/a		—	—	Alexandra	Giorgiana	Nominated	Saved	—				—	Alexandra	—N/a		—	—				—	—	—	Sebastian	Sebastian	Nominated	Saved	—	Elena	Majda	Nominated	Saved	Andreea A.	—	—N/a		—	Sick Day (Note: Sick Day; Due to medical intervention by production, Roxana N. did not attend Tribal Council but not be deemed unable to continue with the game. As she could not attend Tribal Council, she could not vote, nor be voted out.)													Evacuated																																																																													
Andreea A.	Not in Game																														Exempt					Roxana N.	Nominated			Saved	—	Sebastian	Nominated		Saved	Sebastian	Nominated			Voted Out																																																																																	
Romina	Not in Game																														Exempt					—	Musty	—N/a		—	Albert	—	—N/a		Voted Out																																																																																						
Musty	Alin	—	—N/a		—	—	—				Andreea M.	Roxana G.	—N/a	—	Alin	Nominated			Saved	Marilena	Alin	—N/a	Saved	—	—	—	—				—	—				—	Albert	—N/a		Voted Out																																																																																											
Majda	—	Amna	—N/a		—	—	Sick Day (Note: Sick Day; Due to medical intervention by production, Majda did not attend Tribal Council but not be deemed unable to continue with the game. As she could not attend Tribal Council, she could not vote, nor be voted out.)	Costi	—N/a	—	—				—	Alexandra	—N/a		—	—				—	—	—	Sebastian	Sebastian	—N/a	Saved	—	Roxana N.	Ana	—N/a	Voted Out																																																																																																
Roxana G.	Andreea M.	—	Alin		—	—	—				Andreea M.	Musty	—N/a	—	Musty	—	Marilena		—	Sick Day (Note: Sick Day; Due to medical intervention by production, Roxana G. did not attend Tribal Council but not be deemed unable to continue with the game. As she could not attend Tribal Council, she could not vote, nor be voted out.)				—	—	—	—				Evacuated																																																																																																				
Simona	—	Amna	—N/a		—	—	Roxana N.	Costi	—N/a	—	—				—	Jador	—N/a		—	—				—	—	—	Sebastian	Sebastian	Nominated	Voted Out																																																																																																					
Alin	Sorin	—	—N/a		—	Saved	—				Andreea M.	Maria H.	—N/a	Saved	Musty	—	—N/a		—	Marilena	Mellina	Musty	—	—	—	Evacuated																																																																																																									
Alexandra	—	Amna	—N/a		—	Saved	Roxana N.	Costi	—N/a	Saved	—				—	Elena	Nominated		Saved	—				—	Evacuated																																																																																																										
Marilena	Alin	—	—N/a		—	—	—				Musty	Musty	—N/a	Saved	Sick Day (Note: Sick Day; Due to medical intervention by production, Marilena did not attend Tribal Council but not be deemed unable to continue with the game. As she could not attend Tribal Council, she could not vote, nor be voted out.)	—	—N/a		Saved	Alin	Alin	Mihaela	Saved	Quit																																																																																																											
Mihaela	Not in Game														Exempt					Marilena	Alin	—N/a	Voted Out																																																																																																												
Giorgiana	Switch	Amna	—N/a		—	—	Alexandra	Costi	—N/a	—	—				—	Alexandra	—	—N/a	Voted Out																																																																																																																
Andreea M.	Roxana G.	—	—N/a		—	—	—				Roxana G.	Roxana G.	Nominated	Voted Out																																																																																																																					
Costi	—	Amna	—N/a		—	—	Alexandra	Giorgiana	Nominated	Voted Out																																																																																																																									
Amna	—	Simona	Nominated			Voted Out																																																																																																																													
Lucian	Sorin	—	—N/a		Evacuated																																																																																																																														
