= Edmond Zannidache =

Romanian reality TV personality

Zannidache
- Born: Edmond Hubert Zannidache; September 20, 1998 (age 27); Bucharest, Romania
- Television: Survivor România 2021; Survivor România All Stars; Splash! Vedete la apă Chefi la cuțite

Edmond Zannidache (born September 20, 1998) is a Romanian television personality who became known for his appearances on the reality game show Survivor România. He won the first two seasons he appeared on, Survivor România 2021 and Survivor România All Stars, making him the show's first two-time winner.

== Early life ==
Zannidache was born in Bucharest on September 20, 1998. Both of his parents are Greek. After his birth, his parents returned to Greece, abandoning him in an orphanage where he lived until the age of 6, and then joined the organization 'SOS Children's Villages'.

Zannidache was discovered and supported professionally by Alex Velea, a well-known artist and producer from Romania. With his help, Zannidache managed to break into the music industry, quickly gaining recognition in the Romanian trap scene.

== Survivor România ==
=== 2021 ===
Zannidache was part of the "Faimoșii" tribe and made a name for himself in various challenges, earning the respect of the other contestants from the beginning. He had a close relationship with former gymnast Ana Porgras, with whom he allied throughout the competition. He also formed an alliance with former karate champion Cosmin Stanciu. Despite his strong performances, Zannidache faced difficult moments, being involved in several conflicts, especially with singer Jador and dancer Elena Marin. These conflicts marked an important part of his experience in the competition, but Zannidache managed to navigate these tensions and remain focused on his goals. In the end, his eccentric personality and sports skills helped Zannidache gain the public's appreciation, which rewarded him with the title of the Sole Survivor after 26 weeks of competition.

=== 2023 ===
Zannidache, along with Alex Delea, Elena Chiriac and Oana Ciocan, participated in the show's 4th season which aired in 2023. Neither participated in any direct aspect of the game, but instead, they served as mentors to any player, offering advice on various topics deemed valuable attributes of a Survivor player. Neither mentor was in contention to win prize.

=== All Stars ===
Zannidache accepted a spot on "Survivor Romania All Stars", a special edition with former contestants from previous seasons. He was one of three previous winners chosen; the other two were: Elena Ionescu and Alex Delea. Once again, he was part of the "Faimoșii" tribe and performed remarkably in various immunity challenges, proving that he remains a force to be reckoned with on the field. A significant moment of the competition was when he found the Immunity Idol, becoming the first contestant from the "Faimoșii" tribe to obtain it and also the first contestant to use an Immunity Idol to protect a contestant from the opposing tribe. Zannidache quickly established himself as the leader of the tribe and formed a strong alliance with gymnasts Ana Porgras and Ștefania Stănilă, as well as influencer TJ Miles. Together, they managed to reach the tribe unification, eliminating one by one the other contestants from the "Faimoșii" tribe. However, due to his sports abilities and status as the team leader, Zannidache became an easy target after the tribes were unified, being considered a threat by the other contestants. At the end of the competition, the public rewarded him again with the title of "Sole Survivor," making him the first contestant in the history of "Survivor Romania" to win twice.

== Other media appearances ==
In 2022, Zannidache was the host of the pilot show "Survivor: ExtraShow."

In 2023, Zannidache won the fifth season of Splash! Vedete la apă (Celebrity Splash!)
