= Survivor România 2020 =

- Season 1
- Promotional poster
- Presented by: Dan Cruceru
- No. of days: 132
- No. of castaways: 29
- Winner: Elena Ionescu
- Runner-up: Emanuel Neagu
- Location: La Romana, Dominican Republic
- No. of episodes: 75

Release
- Original network: Kanal D
- Original release: 18 January – 30 May 2020

Additional information
- Filming dates: 16 January – 30 May 2020

Season chronology
- Next → 2021

Survivor România 2020 is the first season of Survivor România, a Romanian television series based on the popular reality game show Survivor. The season featured 20 contestants divided into two tribes: "Faimoșii", composed of ten high-achievers who excelled in their fields, and "Războinicii", composed of ten everyday Romanians.

The season premiered on 18 January 2020, and concluded on 30 May 2020, where Elena Ionescu was named the winner over Emanuel Neagu, Iancu Sterp and Lola Crudu, winning the grand prize of 250.000 lei and title of Sole Survivor.

It was the first season to air on Kanal D and be hosted by Dan Cruceru, and was filmed in La Romana, Dominican Republic from January to May 2020.

== Contestants ==
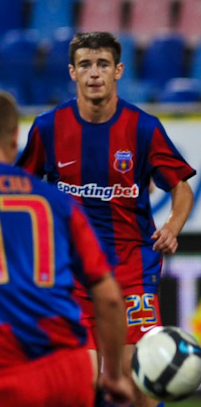
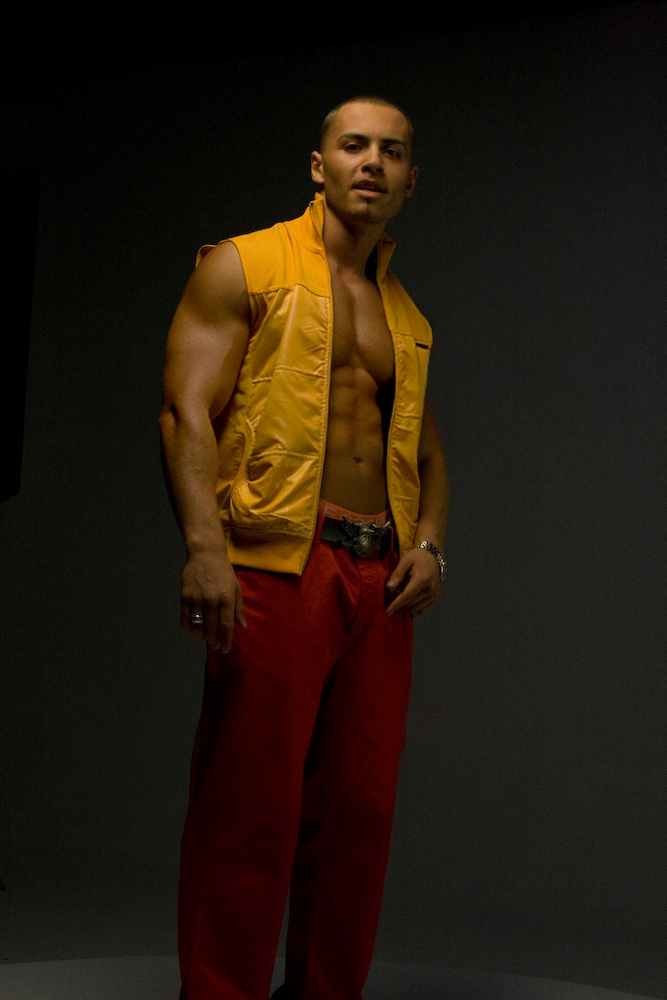
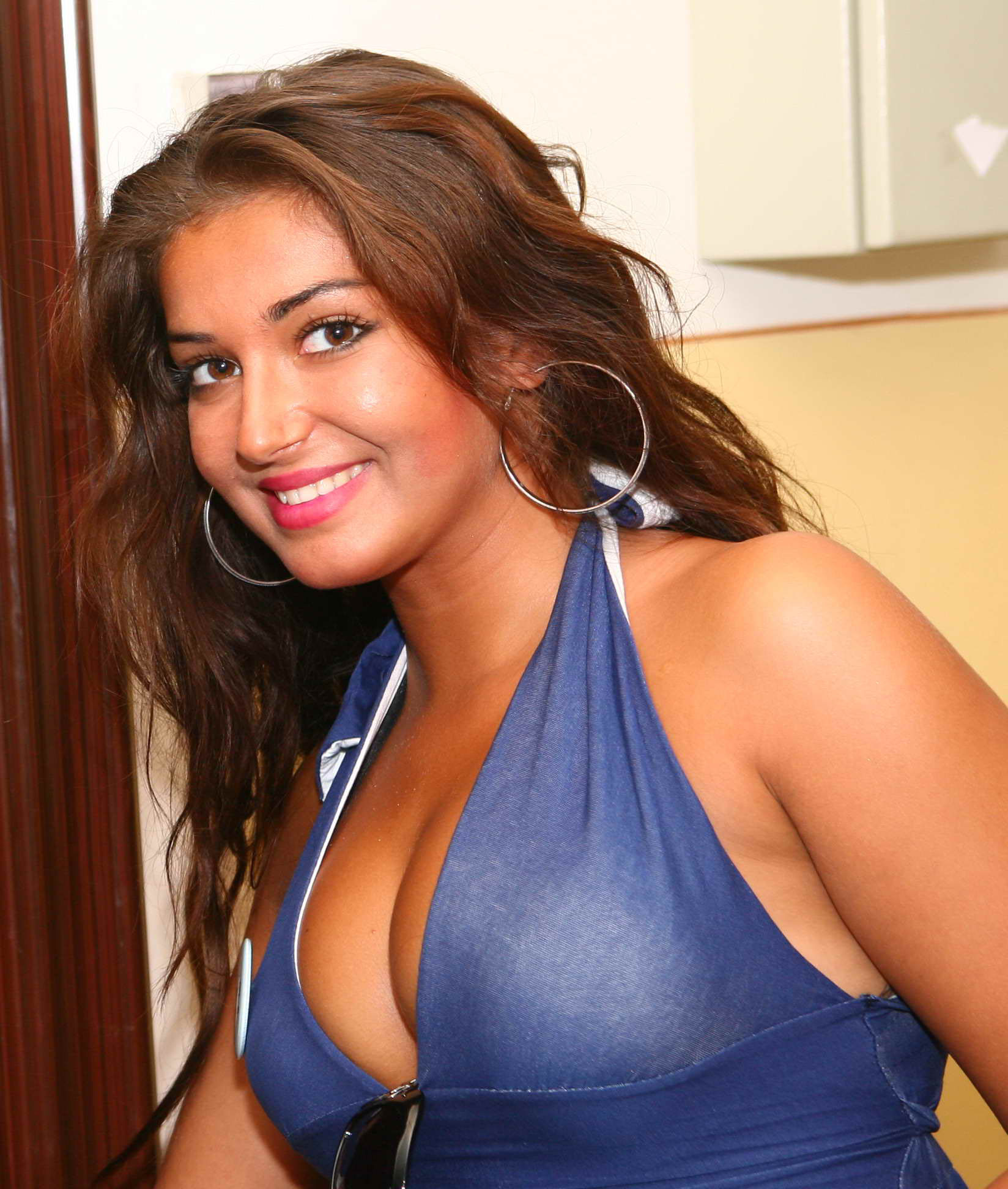
From left to right: Mihai Onicaș, Sonny Flame and Elena Ionescu.

Faimoșii tribe include a former elite gymnast, Asiana Peng, a former FCSB player, Mihai Onicaș and a professional boxer, Cezar Juratoni. Războinicii tribe include Ultimul trib contestant, Lola Crudu, Îmi place dansul finalist, Emanuel Neagu, Vocea României, X Factor România and Ninja Warrior România contestant, Andrei Ciobanu and Insula Iubirii tempter, Andi Constantin. Ioana Filimon, Miss Romania 2016 was originally cast but she dropped out before the game began due to a medical emergency. Filimon was replaced by former Mandinga member, Elena Ionescu.

During the game, nine new contestants joined the remaining original contestants.

List of Survivor Romania 2020 contestants
Contestant	Age	From	Occupation	Tribe			Finish
Contestant	Age	From	Occupation	Original	None	Placement	Day
Augustin Viziru	39	Bucharest	Actor	Faimoșii		Medically evacuated	Day 4
Cristina Șișcanu	35	Ungheni, Moldova	Journalist	Faimoșii		1st Voted Out	Day 8
Claudia "Ruby" Grigore	31	Medgidia, Constanța	Dance-pop singer	Faimoșii		2nd Voted Out	Day 15
Cornel Chirică	27	Bucharest	Fitness instructor	Războinicii		Quit	Day 18
Lino Golden	22	Brașov, Brașov	Hip-hop and rap singer	Faimoșii		3rd Voted Out	Day 22
Bogdan Vlădău	40	Bucharest	Model	Faimoșii		4th Voted Out	Day 25
Alexandra Soare	24	Bucharest	Tennis player	Războinicii		Medically evacuated	Day 29
Ana Maria Pal	26	Bacău, Bacău	MMA fighter	Faimoșii		Ejected	Day 32
Claudia Rostaș	28	Beclean, Bistrița-Năsăud	Cleaner	Războinicii		5th Voted Out	Day 32
Raul Cormoș	24	Baia Mare, Maramureș	Fitness instructor	Faimoșii		Medically evacuated	Day 39
Remus Mihai	41	Bucharest	Pilot	Războinicii		6th Voted Out	Day 39
Adriana Popescu	30	Bucharest	Rugby player	Războinicii		7th Voted Out	Day 46
Andi Constantin	28	Băicoi, Prahova	Fitness model	Războinicii		8th Voted Out	Day 53
Grațiela Teohari Duban	33	Buzău, Buzău	Theater actress	Faimoșii		9th Voted Out	Day 67
Cristian Ioniță	27	Bucharest	Restaurant manager	Războinicii		10th Voted Out	Day 74
Sonny Flame	33	Ploiești, Prahova	Singer	Faimoșii		11th Voted Out	Day 81
Mihai Onicaș	30	Cluj-Napoca, Cluj	Footballer	Faimoșii		12th Voted Out	Day 88
Alice Andrucă	23	Bucharest	Fitness instructor	Războinicii		13th Voted Out	Day 95
Asiana Peng	20	Deva, Hunedoara	Former elite gymnast	Faimoșii		14th Voted Out	Day 100
Karina Fetica	24	Craiova, Dolj	Student	Războinicii		15th Voted Out	Day 102
Andrei Ciobanu	29	Bacău, Bacău	Music teacher	Războinicii		16th Voted Out	Day 107
Carmen Emanuela "Ema" Huruială	30	Reșița, Caraș-Severin	Accountant	Războinicii	None (Note: There was no official tribal designation at this point in the game.)	17th Voted Out	Day 114
Ghiță Balmuș	27	Arad, Arad	Basketballer	Faimoșii	None	18th Voted Out	Day 116
Emy Alupei	21	Bucharest	Trapper	Faimoșii	None	19th Voted Out	Day 127
Cezar Juratoni	31	Deva, Hunedoara	Professional boxer	Faimoșii	None	20th Voted Out	Day 128
Lola Crudu	33	Chișinău, Moldova	Fitness instructor and insurance agent	Războinicii	None	3rd Runner-up	Day 132
Iancu Sterp	21	Tuștea, Hunedoara	Student	Războinicii	None	2nd Runner-up	Day 132
Emanuel Neagu	23	Cocorăștii Colț, Prahova	Dancer	Războinicii	None	Runner-up	Day 132
Elena Ionescu	32	Caracal, Olt	Pop singer	Faimoșii	None	Sole Survivor	Day 132

=== Future appearances ===
Augustin Viziru, Ana Maria Pal, Andrei Ciobanu, Cezar Juratoni, Lola Crudu, Iancu Sterp, Emanuel Neagu and Elena Ionescu competed on Survivor România All Stars.

=== International appearances ===
Emanuel Neagu and Emy Alupei competed on MTV's The Challenge: Spies, Lies & Allies. In the summer of 2023, Neagu competed on MTV's The Challenge: Battle for a New Champion. He became the sole winner of the season.

== Season summary ==
=== Nomination mechanism ===
The tribe(s) attend Tribal Council to nominate a certain number of players.

- Cycle 1 - Cycle 4: There was only one Tribal Immunity Challenge, the losing tribe would have three nominees, one by vote and two chosen by the Individual Immunity winners.
- Cycle 5 - Cycle 16: Two Tribal Immunity Challenges are performed, after each challenge the losing tribe must attend Tribal Council and nominate one of its members by vote. If a tribe wins both challenges, the losing tribe must attend the Tribal Council and two of its members will be nominated, but if each tribe wins a challenge, then both tribes will have one nominees. Also, Individual Immunity Challenge are no more.

Episode(s)		Challenge winner(s)			Nominated (vote)	Eliminated (public vote)	Finish
No.	Original air date	Reward	Tribal immunity	Individual immunity	Nominated (vote)	Eliminated (public vote)	Finish
1–5	January 18 – 21, 2020; January 25, 2020	Războinicii	Războinicii	Lino, Ruby	Cristina (7-2)	Augustin	Evacuated; Day 4
1–5	January 18 – 21, 2020; January 25, 2020	Războinicii	Războinicii	Lino, Ruby	Cristina (7-2)	Augustin	Evacuated; Day 4
1–5	January 18 – 21, 2020; January 25, 2020	Războinicii	Războinicii	Lino, Ruby	Asiana, Elena (1-1-0)	Cristina	1st voted out Day 8
1–5	January 18 – 21, 2020; January 25, 2020	Războinicii	Războinicii	Lino, Ruby	Asiana, Elena (1-1-0)	Cristina	1st voted out Day 8
6-9	January 26 – 29, 2020; February 1, 2020	Faimoșii	Războinicii	Asiana, Cezar [Ghiță, Raul] (Note: As new contestants, Ghiță and Raul were immune for the week. They could not compete in the Individual Immunity Challenge but could vote at Tribal Council.)	Elena (7-2-1)	Ruby	2nd voted out Day 15
6-9	January 26 – 29, 2020; February 1, 2020	Faimoșii	Războinicii	Asiana, Cezar [Ghiță, Raul]	Lino, Ruby (1-1-0)	Ruby	2nd voted out Day 15
6-9	January 26 – 29, 2020; February 1, 2020	Războinicii	Războinicii	Asiana, Cezar [Ghiță, Raul]	Lino, Ruby (1-1-0)	Ruby	2nd voted out Day 15
10-13	February 2–4, 2020; February 8, 2020	Faimoșii	Războinicii	Cezar, Elena [Ana Maria] (Note: As new contestant, Ana was immune for the week. She could not compete in the Individual Immunity Challenge but could vote at Tribal Council.)	Asiana, Raul (4-4-2)	Cornel	Quit; Day 18
10-13	February 2–4, 2020; February 8, 2020	Războinicii	Războinicii	Cezar, Elena [Ana Maria]	Bogdan, Lino (1-1-0)	Lino	3rd voted out Day 22
10-13	February 2–4, 2020; February 8, 2020	Războinicii	Războinicii	Cezar, Elena [Ana Maria]	Bogdan, Lino (1-1-0)	Lino	3rd voted out Day 22
14–16	February 9 – 11, 2020	Războinicii	Războinicii	Ana Maria, Cezar	Bogdan (4-2-1-1)	Bogdan	4th voted out Day 25
14–16	February 9 – 11, 2020	Faimoșii (Note: Mini game)	Războinicii	Ana Maria, Cezar	Elena, Asiana (1-1-0)	Bogdan	4th voted out Day 25
14–16	February 9 – 11, 2020	Războinicii	Războinicii	Ana Maria, Cezar	Elena, Asiana (1-1-0)	Bogdan	4th voted out Day 25
17–20	February 15 – 18, 2020	Războinicii	Faimoșii	None (Note: There was no Individual Immunity due to new format.)	Claudia (9-1)	Alexandra	Evacuated; Day 29
17–20	February 15 – 18, 2020	Faimoșii	Faimoșii	None	Remus (9-1)	Ana Maria	Ejected; Day 32
17–20	February 15 – 18, 2020	Războinicii	Faimoșii	None	Remus (9-1)	Claudia	5th voted out Day 32
21-24	February 22 – 25, 2020	Faimoșii	Faimoșii	None	Remus (8-1)	Raul	Evacuated; Day 39
21-24	February 22 – 25, 2020	Războinicii	Faimoșii	None	Lola (7-2)	Remus	6th voted out Day 39
25-28	February 29 – March 3, 2020	Războinicii	Faimoșii	None	Lola (6-2)	Adriana	7th voted out Day 46
25-28	February 29 – March 3, 2020	Războinicii	Faimoșii	None	Adriana (4-2-1-1)	Adriana	7th voted out Day 46
29-32	March 7 – 10, 2020	Faimoșii	Războinicii	None	Andi (5-1-1)	Andi	8th voted out Day 53
29-32	March 7 – 10, 2020	Războinicii	Faimoșii	None	Grațiela (5-1)	Andi	8th voted out Day 53
33-36	March 14 – 17, 2020	Faimoșii	None	None	No elimination on Cycle 9		
33-36	March 14 – 17, 2020	Războinicii	None	None	No elimination on Cycle 9		
33-36	March 14 – 17, 2020	Faimoșii	None	None	No elimination on Cycle 9		
33-36	March 14 – 17, 2020	Războinicii	None	None	No elimination on Cycle 9		
37-40	March 21 – 24, 2020	Războinicii	Războinicii	None	Grațiela (4-3-1)	Grațiela	9th voted out Day 67
37-40	March 21 – 24, 2020	Faimoșii	Războinicii	None	Ghiță (5-3)	Grațiela	9th voted out Day 67
41-44	March 28 – 31, 2020	Faimoșii	Faimoșii	None	Andrei (5-2-1)	Cristian	10th voted out Day 74
41-44	March 28 – 31, 2020	Războinicii	Faimoșii	None	Cristian (4-3-1)	Cristian	10th voted out Day 74
45-48	April 4 – 7, 2020	Războinicii	Războinicii	None	Sonny (4-3-1)	Sonny	11th voted out Day 81
45-48	April 4 – 7, 2020	Faimoșii	Războinicii	None	Elena (5-3)	Sonny	11th voted out Day 81
49-52	April 11–14, 2020	Războinicii	Războinicii	None	Elena (4-2)	Mihai	12th voted out Day 88
49-52	April 11–14, 2020	Războinicii	Războinicii	None	Mihai (5-1)	Mihai	12th voted out Day 88
53-56	April 18 – 21, 2020	Faimoșii	Faimoșii	None	Lola (4-3)	Alice	13th voted out Day 95
53-56	April 18 – 21, 2020	Războinicii	Faimoșii	None	Alice (6-1)	Alice	13th voted out Day 95
57-60	April 25–28, 2020	None	Războinicii	None	Elena (4-1)	Asiana	14th voted out Day 100
57-60	April 25–28, 2020	None	Războinicii	None	Asiana (3-2)	Asiana	14th voted out Day 100
57-60	April 25–28, 2020	Războinicii (Note: Combined reward and immunity challenge.)		None	Elena (3-1)	Karina	15th voted out Day 102
57-60	April 25–28, 2020	None	Faimoșii	None	Karina, Lola (3-3)	Karina	15th voted out Day 102
61-64	May 2 – 4, 2020	Faimoșii		None	Andrei (3-1-1)	Andrei	16th voted out Day 108
61-64	May 2 – 4, 2020	Faimoșii		None	Iancu (3-2)	Andrei	16th voted out Day 108
61-64	May 2 – 4, 2020	Cezar, Lola	None	None	No elimination on episode 63 and episode 64 due to individual phase of the game		
61-64	May 2 – 4, 2020	Ema, Iancu [Emanuel, Lola]	None	None	No elimination on episode 63 and episode 64 due to individual phase of the game		
65-68	May 9 – 12, 2020	None	None	Iancu (Note: Iancu won Individual Immunity and the power to nominate a member at Tribal Council.)	Ema, Ghiță (4-4)	Ema	17th voted out Day 114
65-68	May 9 – 12, 2020	None	None	Emy	Cezar (1–0)	Ema	17th voted out Day 114
65-68	May 9 – 12, 2020	None	None	Emanuel (Note: Emanuel won Individual Immunity and the power to nominate a member at Tribal Council.)	Cezar, Iancu (3–3–1)	Ghiță	18th voted out Day 116
65-68	May 9 – 12, 2020	None	None	Lola	Ghiță (1–0)	Ghiță	18th voted out Day 116
69-72	May 23 – 26, 2020	Cezar, Emanuel, Iancu	None	Emanuel, Lola (Note: Emanuel and Lola won immunity by winning Week 18's Special Challenge. Part of the rewards allowed both of them to attend Tribal Council with no risk of being voted off until The Grand Final.)	No elimination on Cycle 18		
69-72	May 23 – 26, 2020	Elena, Emy, Lola	None	Emanuel, Lola	No elimination on Cycle 18		
73-74	May 23 – 26, 2020	None	None	Iancu	Cezar, Emy (3-3)	Emy	19th voted out Day 127
73-74	May 23 – 26, 2020	None	None	Iancu	Elena (1–0)	Emy	19th voted out Day 127
73-74	May 23 – 26, 2020	None	None	Iancu	Cezar, Elena (No vote) (Note: After Iancu won the Final Immunity Challenge, Cezar and Elena were automatically nominated for elimination.)	Cezar	20th voted out Day 129
75	May 30, 2020	Public vote				Public vote	
75	May 30, 2020	Public vote				Lola	3rd runner-up
75	May 30, 2020	Public vote				Iancu	2nd runner-up
75	May 30, 2020	Public vote				Emanuel	Runner-up
75	May 30, 2020	Public vote				Elena	Sole Survivor

== Voting history ==
	Original tribes																																																					No tribes														
Week #	1				2			3				4			5					6				7			8			10			11			12			13			14			15						16			17						19								
Episode #	4			5	8		9	12			13	14		15	17		18	20		22	23	24		25	26	28	29	30	32	37	38	40	41	42	44	45	46	48	51	52		55	56		57	58		59	60		61	62		66			68			73			74		75			
Voted Out	Augustin	Nomination vote		Cristina	Nomination vote		Ruby	Cornel	Nomination vote		Lino	Nomination vote		Bogdan	Alexandra	Nomination vote		Ana Maria	Claudia	Nomination vote		Raul	Remus	Nomination vote		Adriana	Nomination vote		Andi	Nomination vote		Grațiela	Nomination vote		Cristian	Nomination vote		Sonny	Nomination vote		Mihai	Nomination vote		Alice	Nomination vote		Asiana	Nomination vote		Karina	Nomination vote		Andrei	Nomination vote		Ema	Nomination vote		Ghiță	Nomination vote		Emy	Nomination vote	Cezar	Lola	Iancu	Emanuel	Elena
Nominated		Cristina	Asiana & Elena		Elena	Lino & Ruby			Asiana & Raul	Bogdan & Lino		Bogdan	Asiana & Elena			Claudia	Remus			Remus	Lola			Lola	Adriana		Andi	Grațiela		Grațiela	Ghiță		Andrei	Cristian		Sonny	Elena		Elena	Mihai		Lola	Alice		Elena	Asiana		Elena	Lola & Karina		Andrei	Iancu		Ema & Ghiță	Cezar		Cezar & Iancu	Ghiță		Cezar & Emy	Elena		Cezar & Elena					
Votes	No vote (Note: No vote; Augustin was medically evacuated from the game due to an injury sustained in the second reward challenge.)	7-2	1-1-0 (Note: The winner(s) of the Individual Immunity had to directly nominate a member of the tribe.)	Public vote	7-2-1	1-1-0	Public vote	No vote (Note: No vote; Cornel left the game after a minor injury.)	4-4-2	1-1-0	Public vote	4-2-1-1	1-1-0	Public vote	No vote (Note: No vote; Alexandra was medically evacuated from the game due to an injury sustained in the challenge.)	9-1	9-1	No vote (Note: No vote; Ana Maria was ejected from the game due to her aggressive behavior (she headbutting Andrei during a challenge).)	Public vote	8-1	7-2	No vote (Note: No vote; Raul was medically evacuated from the game due to an injury sustained in the challenge.)	Public vote	6-2	4-2-1-1	Public vote	5-1-1	5-1	Public vote	4-3-1	5-3	Public vote	5-2-1	4-3-1	Public vote	4-3-1	5-3	Public vote	4-2	5-1	Public vote	4-3	6-1	Public vote	4-1	3-2	Public vote	3-1	3-3	Public vote	3-1-1	3-2	Public vote	4-4	1-0	Public vote	3-3-1	1-0	Public vote	3-3	1-0	Public vote	No vote (Note: No vote; After Iancu won the last immunity challenge, Cezar and Elena were automatically nominated for elimination.)	Public vote	Public vote			
Voter	Vote																																																																			
Elena	—	Cristina	—N/a	Saved	Ruby	Nominated	Saved	—	Bogdan	Bogdan	—	Bogdan	—N/a	Saved	—	—		—	—	—		—	—	—			—	Grațiela	—	Grațiela	Ghiță	—	—			Asiana	Ghiță	Saved	Mihai	Mihai	Saved	—			Cezar	Asiana	Saved	Cezar	Nominated	Saved	—			Ema	—N/a	—	Iancu	—N/a	—	Cezar	—N/a	Saved	Nominated	Saved	Sole Survivor			
Emanuel	—	—			—			—	—			—			—	Claudia	Remus	—	—	Remus	Lola	—	—	Lola	Ema	—	Andi	—	—	—			Andrei	Karina	—	—			—			Alice	Alice	—	—			—	Karina	—	Andrei	Iancu	—	Ghiță	—N/a	—	Cezar	Ghiță	—	Emy	—N/a	—	Finalist (Note: Emanuel and Lola won immunity by winning Week 18's Special Challenge. Part of the rewards allowed both of them to attend Tribal Council with no risk of being voted off until The Grand Final.)		Runner-up			
Iancu	Not in Game																													—			Andrei	Cristian	—	—			—			Lola	Alice	—	—			—	Lola	—	Ema	Ema	Saved	Ghiță	Cezar	Saved	Cezar	Nominated	Saved	Cezar	Elena	—	Immune		Third place			
Lola	—	—			—			—	—			—			—	Claudia	Remus	—	—	Remus	Andi	Nominated	Saved	Ema	Andi	Saved	Andi	—	—	—			Andrei	Karina	—	—			—			Alice	Alice	Saved	—			—	Karina	Saved	Andrei	Iancu	—	Ghiță	—N/a	—	Cezar	—N/a	—	Emy	—N/a	—	Finalist		Fourth place			
Cezar	—	Cristina	—N/a	—	Mihai	Ruby	—	—	Asiana	Lino	—	Ghiță	Asiana	—	—	—		—	—	—		—	—	—			—	Grațiela	—	Ghiță	Ghiță	—	—			Sonny	Elena	—	Elena	Mihai	—	—			Elena	Ghiță	—	Elena	—	—	—			Ema	Nominated	Saved	Iancu	Nominated	Saved	Emy	Nominated	Saved	Nominated	Voted Out				
Emy	Not in Game																													Sonny	Mihai	—	—			Asiana	Asiana	—	Mihai	Mihai	—	—			Elena	Asiana	—	Elena	—	—	—			Ema	—N/a	—	Elena	—N/a	—	Cezar	Nominated	Voted Out						
Ghiță	Not in Game				Elena	—N/a	—	—	Asiana	—N/a	—	Bogdan	—N/a	—	—	—		—	—	—		—	—	—			—	Grațiela	—	Sonny	Mihai	Saved	—			Sonny	Elena	—	Elena	Mihai	—	—			Elena	Asiana	—	Elena	—	—	—			Ema	—N/a	Saved	Iancu	—N/a	Voted out									
Ema	—	—			—			—	—			—			—	Claudia	Remus	—	—	Remus	Lola	—	—	Lola	Adriana	—	Emanuel	—	—	—			Andrei	Alice	—	—			—			Alice	Alice	—	—			—	Karina	—	Andrei	Iancu	—	Ghiță	Nominated	Voted out												
Andrei	—	—			—			—	—			—			—	Claudia	Remus	—	—	Remus	Lola	—	—	Lola	Adriana	—	Andi	—	—	—			Alice	Cristian	Saved	—			—			Lola	Alice	—	—			—	Lola	—	Lola	Ema	Voted Out															
Karina	—	—			—			—	—			—			—	Claudia	Remus	—	—	Remus	Lola	—	—	Lola	Adriana	—	Andi	—	—	—			Alice	Cristian	—	—			—			Lola	Alice	—	—			—	Lola	Voted Out																		
Asiana	—	Cristina	—N/a	Saved	Elena	Lino	—	—	Raul	Nominated	Saved	Grațiela	—N/a	Saved	—	—		—	—	—		—	—	—			—	Grațiela	—	Grațiela	Ghiță	—	—			Sonny	Elena	—	Elena	Mihai	—	—			Elena	Ghiță	Voted Out																					
Alice	Not in Game																													—			Karina	Cristian	—	—			—			Lola	Iancu	Voted Out																								
Mihai	—	Cristina	—N/a	—	Elena	—N/a	—	—	Asiana	—N/a	—	Grațiela	—N/a	—	—	—		—	—	—		—	—	—			—	Grațiela	—	Grațiela	Ghiță	—	—			Sonny	Elena	—	Elena	Ghiță	Voted Out																											
Sonny	Not in Game																													Grațiela	Ghiță	—	—			Asiana	Asiana	Voted Out																														
Cristian	—	—			—			—	—			—			—	Claudia	Remus	—	—	Remus	Lola	—	—	Lola	Adriana	—	Andi	—	—	—			Andrei	Karina	Voted Out																																	
Grațiela	—	Cristina	—N/a	—	Elena	—N/a	—	—	Asiana	—N/a	—	Mihai	—N/a	—	—	—		—	—	—		—	—	—			—	Cezar	Saved	Sonny	Mihai	Voted Out																																				
Andi	—	—			—			—	—			—			—	Claudia	Remus	—	—	Remus	Lola	—	—	Lola	Cristian	—	Andrei	Nominated	Voted Out																																							
Adriana	—	—			—			—	—			—			—	Claudia	Remus	—	—	Remus	Lola	—	—	Ema	Ema	Voted Out																																										
Remus	—	—			—			—	—			—			—	Claudia	Ema	Nominated	Saved	Cristian	Andi	Nominated	Voted Out																																													
Raul	Not in Game				Elena	—N/a	—	—	Bogdan	Nominated	Saved	Bogdan	—N/a	—	—	—		—	—	—		Evacuated																																														
Claudia	—	—			—			—	—			—			—	Cristian	Remus	Nominated	Voted Out																																																	
Ana Maria	Not in Game							—	Raul	—N/a	—	Bogdan	Elena	—	—	—		Ejected																																																		
Alexandra	Not in Game							—	—			—			Evacuated																																																					
Bogdan	—	Cristina	—N/a	—	Elena	—N/a	—	—	Raul	—N/a	Saved	Elena	Nominated	Voted Out																																																						
Lino	—	Cristina	Asiana	—	Elena	—N/a	Saved	—	Raul	—N/a	Voted Out																																																									
Cornel	Not in Game				—			Quit																																																												
Ruby	—	Asiana	Elena	—	Elena	—N/a	Voted Out																																																													
Cristina	—	Asiana	Nominated	Voted Out																																																																
Augustin	Evacuated																																																																			
