= Survivor România =

- Genre: Reality television
- Created by: Charlie Parsons; Acun Ilıcalı
- Directed by: Acun Ilıcalı
- Presented by: Adi Vasile (7—); Daniel Pavel (2—6); Dan Cruceru (1)
- Country of origin: Romania
- Original language: Romanian
- No. of series: 7
- No. of episodes: 464

Production
- Executive producers: Corina Diaconescu (2020–2021); Antonii Mangov (2022–2025); Adrin Batista (2022–2025); Vladimir Dembinski (2026–present)
- Production locations: La Romana, Dominican Republic
- Camera setup: Multiple-camera setup
- Production companies: Acun Medya; Dideas Production

Original release
- Network: Kanal D
- Release: 18 January 2020 – 10 July 2021
- Network: Pro TV; Voyo
- Release: 16 January 2022 – 23 April 2025
- Network: Antena 1
- Release: 9 January 2026 – present

Related
- Survivor; Expedition Robinson; Exathlon

Survivor România is a Romanian reality game show based on the international Survivor format. The season premiered on 18 January 2020 on Kanal D.

Following the basic premise of other international versions of the format, it features a group of contestants who are marooned in an isolated location, where they must provide food, water, fire, and shelter for themselves. The contestants compete in challenges for rewards and immunity from elimination. The contestants are progressively eliminated from the game until only one remains and is given the title of "Sole Survivor" and awarded the grand prize. The first two seasons's "Sole Survivor" received the prize of €50.000. By the third season, the prize for the winner had been increased to €100.000.

== Format and rules ==
The series follows the same general format as the other editions of the show. The players are split between two "tribes", are taken to a remote isolated location and are forced to live off the land with meager supplies for an extended period of time. Frequent physical and mental challenges are used to pit the teams against each other for rewards, such as food or luxuries, or for "immunity", forcing the other tribe to attend "Tribal Council", where they must vote off one of their players. About halfway through the game, the tribes are merged into a single tribe, and challenges are on an individual basis; winning immunity prevents that player from being voted out. In the first three seasons, the tribes are merged but despite living on the same beach, tribes would still be split, competing against each other in challenges and fending for themselves, in a similar vein to the One World twist from the American version. The individual phase of the game occurred with 6 or 8 players left feature "semi-finals" and "finals", and consisted of a great marathon of tests (physical and logical) involving elements used throughout the season.

Like other editions of the show, the Romanian edition has introduced numerous modifications or twists on the core rules to prevent players from over-relying on strategies that succeeded in prior seasons or other editions of the show. These changes have included tribe switches, hidden immunity idols and players being exiled or kidnapped from their tribe for a short period of time.

=== Differences in format ===
Unlike most versions of Survivor, with a maximum of one Reward Challenge before elimination, the Romanian version performs up to four Reward Challenges before the Immunity Challenge. Challenges pitted people in 1v1 (or sometimes 2v2 or 3v3) situations, with the winner gifting their team a point. Teams that reached 10 points first won the challenge (like a volleyball match).

Another difference in rules between Survivor România and other editions is how the unexpected eliminations are handled. On Survivor România, when a player is eliminated from the game outside of "Tribal Council" (either by being removed for medical reasons, or quitting), the player is replaced by a completely new contestant, who will take their place and the game continues as planned.

Another difference in Romanian version is the public votes. Before the Tribal, members of the losing tribe fight each other for an Immunity Necklace. Also, in the Romanian version two Immunity Challenges are performed, these will decide the number of members of each tribe that will be nominated. Instead of the most voted person on the Tribal Council having to leave the competition, the tribe(s) votes to nominate one or two of its members. Then the winner(s), one male and one female of the Individual Immunity selects the last nominee from the tribe. Finally, the nominees face the public vote. The fans, through calls and texts, then chose the Survivor who should leave the game. This change required the game to be broadcast with minimal delay (usually 2 days) in order for the fans to vote in time. In the end, the public also vote for which player should be considered the "Sole Survivor" and be awarded the grand prize.

== Survivor in Romania ==
=== Earlier versions ===
The series first aired in 2009 on the Kanal D named Rătăciți în Panama (Lost in Panama). The series was filmed in Bocas del Toro, Panama and premiered on September 28, 2009, featuring 18 players (nine men and nine women), divided into three tribes of six based on their occupations and degree of success in life and it was hosted by Andrei Gheorghe. The show airs on television five days per week. At the time of airing, Rătăciți în Panama was the most expensive Romanian TV show ever produced, costing over €2,000,000 to make, roughly equal to US$3,300,000 in 2023. However the €2 million investment only achieved modest audience, averaging 105,000 viewers (0.9 rating points) over the course of 60 episodes. The show's audience record (168,000 viewers and 1.4 rating points) was set during its launch on September 28, 2009. The competition's finale ranked 8th, with an average audience of only 133,000 urban viewers (1.1 rating points), according to data published by Pagina de Media.

In 2016, another edition aired on the Pro TV named Supraviețuitorul (Survivor). This series was announced by Pro TV on 23 December 2015 and was filmed in Caramoan, Camarines Sur, Philippines from June to July 2016. It aired from 12 September to 22 November 2016 on Pro TV. Hosted by Romanian journalist Dragoș Bucurenci, the program featured 18 Romanian castaways competing for 44 days. Both iterations of the series only lasted one season due to low ratings.

=== Kanal D (2020–2021) ===
Camp location in Dominican Republic

After a 4-year hiatus on 13 November 2019, Kanal D, announced that it would be reviving the series in 2020. The series premiered on 20 January 2020. The programme initially aired 4 times a week. Unlike its predecessors, the show was renewed for another season and has continued to be successful since. On 29 December 2020, Dan Cruceru announced he would be stepping down as presenter after one season. Citing his reasons for leaving, Cruceru said flying back and forth to Dominican Republic "conflicted with [his] new projects" On 6 January, it was announced that former television presenter and swimmer Daniel Pavel would be his replacement. The series launched on 9 January and ended on 10 July 2021, lasting over 180 days - the longest Romanian edition of Survivor to date. This season brought in ratings above the average for the Kanal D station. The first episode, which aired in January, attracted over 2.4 million viewers nationwide. The finale had an audience of over 1.7 million viewers.

=== Pro TV (2022–2025) ===
In September 2021, it was reported that Pro TV Studios were in talks with Acun Medya, who own the rights to Survivor România, to revive the show in 2022. On 12 October 2021, Pro TV aired a teaser trailer, officially confirming that the series would return for a new series in 2022 on Pro TV. Following the announcement of the series, Antonii Mangov, the Programming Director Pro TV said: "We are pleased to announce that in 2022 we will be adding this incredible format to our portfolio. Survivor is already a successful show in Romania, but we will add a touch of what Pro TV represents, which guarantees top-class entertainment." Pro TV has entirely preserved the show's format, using the same location, the same division of tribes, and the same elimination process. On September 29, 2022, Pro TV announced that Survivor România was given the green light to produce its fourth season in 2023. On 9 December 2023, Pro TV confirmed Survivor România All Stars, with the new series set to take place once again in Dominican Republic in 2024. This season also brought a change in the elimination process by introducing a new concept "Elimination duels". Instead of being out of the game by public vote, the nominees of the cycle face a challenge in which the loser is eliminated. The public will votes only in the Grand Final for the most deserving of the title of Sole Survivor.

The 2025 season of Survivor România brought many changes to the show's format who generated numerous criticisms and controversies from viewers. A significant change was the removal of the traditional "Faimoșii" and "Războinicii" tribes. The main complaints focused on declining ratings, format changes, and the perceived loss of authenticity in the show. The season premiere attracted approximately 1.3 million viewers, but audience interest quickly dropped in the following days. For example, on February 17, the show recorded only 14.1 rating points, and in the following days, the numbers continued to decline. In response, Pro TV’s management called an emergency meeting with the production team in the Dominican Republic and decided to move the show to a later time slot. Starting March 3, Survivor România aired at 11:30 PM from Monday to Wednesday.

After the end of Season 6 of Survivor România, rumors began to circulate that Pro TV would stop broadcasting the show after four seasons. On August 27, during the announcement of Pro TV’s fall schedule, Daniel Pavel stated that he would be the host of a new television show, a Desafio-type format. Pavel said "I have been a direct witness to many tough competitions and have seen up close all the stages of survival, but now we are preparing a completely new experience. A new project. An experience. Here, the tests of endurance and courage will be taken further than ever before. These are not just words. The very name, Desafio, represents a brand-new show. Here, strength alone is no longer enough. Strategy is no longer enough either, and emotions can no longer be hidden." The statement confirmed the rumors that Survivor România had been canceled by Pro TV and would not be renewed for a new season in 2026.

=== Antena 1 (2026–present) ===
On October 16, 2025, it was officially confirmed that the format would be taken over by Antena 1, which announced the acquisition of the rights to produce and broadcast the show, scheduled to premiere at the beginning of 2026. Immediately after the announcement, Mihai Ioniță, CEO of Antena, stated: “By acquiring the Survivor format, Antena 1 strengthens its position as a leader in reality show production for Romanian audiences—such as Asia Express, Power Couple, or Temptation Island. Survivor is a competition that inspires, challenges, and brings people together through authentic stories, intense moments, and genuine emotion. In this way, Antena 1 reaffirms its commitment to delivering top-quality entertainment to its viewers.”

On December 1st, 2025, Adi Vasile, former handball player and currently one of the most appreciated coaches, was officially announced by Antena 1 as the new host of Survivor România. After the announcement, Vasile told the news channel Antena 1 the following: "All my life, I have been looking for new challenges, and now, I knew from the very first moment that this is the perfect format for me! Survivor is the only show that pushes contestants beyond their limits. It is an environment where mental endurance must reach high levels to perform, and physical strength is severely tested on every course. In such a fierce competition, I know I will experience every moment, just as I did during handball matches! Faimoșii vs. Războinicii represents the essence of Survivor, and that is what we will bring to the audience at home – competition, extreme situations, and people who understand the game! I look forward to seeing you with us from January!".

Along with the announcement of the host, Antena 1 also revealed that season 7 of the show will return to the old format, "Faimoșii" vs. "Războinicii". Filming took place in the Dominican Republic, beginning on December 24, 2025, and ending on June 7, 2026. The first season of Survivor România, broadcast by Antena 1, recorded an average market share of 19.2% and a rating of 5 points among the commercial audience aged 21–54. According to the broadcaster, the show contributed to a 47% increase in market share compared to the same period in 2025, while the season finale ranked first in audience ratings within the commercial demographic.

== Series overview ==
Each competition is called a season and lasts from 60 to 100+ episodes. A total of 213 contestants have competed on Survivor Romania's 7 seasons, 26 of those participants have competed in two seasons.

List of Survivor (Romania) seasons
No.	Name	Location	Castaways	Days	Original tribes	Winner	Runner-up(s)	Prize
1	2020	La Romana, Dominican Republic	29	132	Two tribes of ten divided by status: "Faimoșii" (overachievers) & "Războinicii" (underdogs)	Elena Ionescu	Emanuel Neagu Iancu Sterp Lola Crudu	€50.000
2	2021	La Romana, Dominican Republic	41	185	Two tribes of twelve divided by status: "Faimoșii" & "Războinicii"	Edmond Zannidache	Andrei Dascălu	€50.000
3	2022	La Romana, Dominican Republic	30	141	Two tribes of twelve divided by status: "Faimoșii" & "Războinicii"	Alex Delea	Elena Chiriac	€100.000
4	2023	La Romana, Dominican Republic	30	135	Two tribes of twelve divided by status: "Faimoșii" & "Războinicii"	Dan Ursa	Andrei Krișan	€100.000
5	All Stars	La Romana, Dominican Republic	26	103	Two tribes of ten returning players divided by previews status: "Faimoșii" & "Războinicii"	Edmond Zannidache	Iancu Sterp	€100.000
6	2025	La Romana, Dominican Republic	26	66	Two tribes of ten new players divided by gender: the all-female "Zeițe" and the all-male "Titani"	Ovidiu "Uwe Dai" Măcinic	Vasile Petrovschi	€100.000
7	Faimoși VS Războinici	La Romana, Dominican Republic	31	111	Two tribes of twelve new players divided by status: "Faimoșii" & "Războinicii"	Gabriel Tamaș	Lucian Popa	€100.000
8	Faimoși VS Războinici	TBA						€100.000

== Broadcast and ratings ==
Official ratings are taken from ARMA (Asociația Română pentru Măsurarea Audiențelor), the organisation that compiles audience measurement and television ratings in Romania.

Survivor Romania has consistently been one of the most-watched television programs in Romania during its first four seasons. The first episode of season 3 was watched by nearly 2.6 million viewers, the highest audience in the show's history.

Season	Network	Episodes	Premiered			Ended			TV season
Season	Network	Episodes	Date	Premiere viewers (in millions)	Rank	Date	Finale viewers (in millions)	Rank	TV season
1	Kanal D	75	January 18, 2020	1.578	2	May 30, 2020	1.420	1	2020
2	Kanal D	106	January 9, 2021	2.003	1	July 10, 2021	1.723	1	2021
3	Pro TV, Voyo	60	January 16, 2022	2.599	1	May 31, 2022	1.739	1	2022
4	Pro TV, Voyo	61	January 9, 2023	2.130	1	May 24, 2023	1.181	2	2023
5	Pro TV, Voyo	60	January 16, 2024	1.654	1	May 30, 2024	1.391	1	2024
6	Pro TV, Voyo	36	February 3, 2025	1.282	1	April 23, 2025	—N/a		2025
7	Antena 1	66	January 9, 2026	1.280	1	June 7, 2026	1.073	1	2026
8	Antena 1	TBA	December, 2026	TBA	#	2027	TBA	#	2026-2027

== Companion series ==
In addition to the main program, three companion web programs are also produced for Survivor România.

=== Survivor: ExtraShow ===
Introduced in season 3, Survivor: ExtraShow is an aftershow that unpacks all of the castaway's strategies from the main show. The show premiered on Sunday 16 January 2022 on Voyo and airs weekly after each night episode of the main show. It is hosted by the winner of the second season of the show, Edmond Zannidache and gives the viewers an exclusive look into moments that occur on the island that aren't shown in the episodes, as well as moments from past seasons and interviews with past contestants.

=== Survivor: Camp Log ===
Following the same primise like Survivor: ExtraShow, Survivor: Camp Log hosted by Alex Delea is introduced in season 4th. The show airs Fridays on YouTube from 3 March 2023 to 12 May 2023.

=== Survivor: dincolo de insulă ===
Introduced after the 4th season, Survivor: dincolo de insulă is based on the Ponderosa series from American Survivor. The series follows the castaways that are voted off during the game and hosts deleted scenes called "Secret Scenes" as well as additional interviews from the castaways. Each episode focuses primarily on the latest evictee. Episodes are released through Voyo from 29 May to 7 July 2023.

=== Survivor - Povești din junglă ===
Survivor – Povești din junglă is an after-show television program introduced in season 7, dedicated to the reality show Survivor România. The program airs from Monday to Friday and offers viewers analyses, commentary, and extended perspectives on the events taking place in the competition, which is broadcast every Friday, Saturday, and Sunday on television. The show highlights both aired moments and exclusive content, including unaired discussions, contestants’ reactions, and interpretations of strategies and conflicts in the jungle. The show is hosted by Alex Delea, alongside Raluca Bădulescu and Anamaria Prodan, and is filmed in the Dominican Republic. The show was cancelled on January 23 due to low ratings.

== Awards and nominations ==
Year	Award	Category	Nominee	Result	Source
2020	Premiile TVmania	Best Reality TV Show with celebrities	2020 Season	Nominated	
2021	Premiile TVmania	Best Reality TV Show with celebrities	2021 Season	Nominated	
2021	Premiile Radar de Media	Best Reality TV Show	2021 Season	Nominated	
2022	Premiile Radar de Media	Best Reality TV Show	2022 Season	Won	
2022	Premiile TVmania	Best Reality TV Show with celebrities	2022 Season	Won	
2023	Premiile Radar de Media	Best Reality TV Show	2023 Season	Won	
2023	Premiile TVmania	Best Reality TV Show with celebrities	2023 Season	Nominated	
2024	Premiile Radar de Media	Best Reality TV Show	All Stars	Won	
2024	Premiile TVmania	Best Reality TV Show with celebrities	All Stars	Nominated	
2026	Premiile TVmania	Best Reality TV Show with celebrities	Faimoși VS Războinici	Nominated	

== Online distribution ==
From Season 3 till Season 6 Survivor România is also available on Voyo, the subscription-based OTT streaming service of Pro TV in Romania.

== See also ==
- Expedition Robinson
- Exathlon
- Insula de 1 milion
