= Parincea =

- Commune
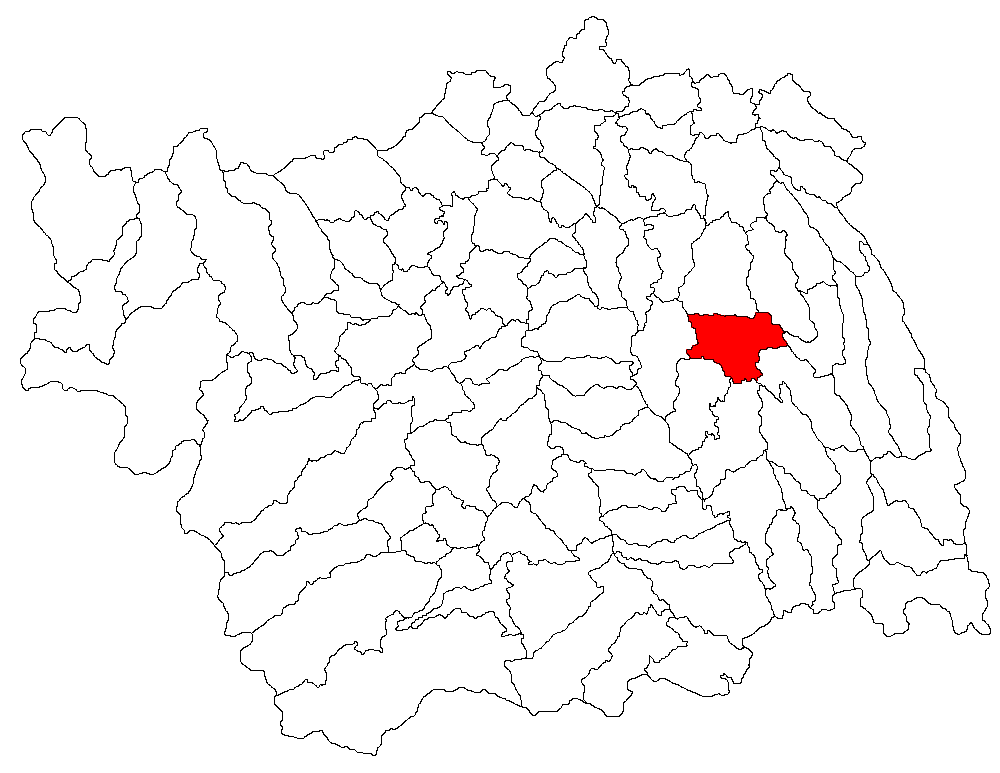
- Location in Bacău County

- Location in Romania
- Coordinates: 46°29′N 27°6′E
- Country: Romania
- County: Bacău

Government
  - Mayor (2024–2028): Sorin Roșu (PSD)
- Area: 65.08 km^{2} (25.13 sq mi)
- Elevation: 365 m (1,198 ft)
- Population (2021-12-01): 3,372
  - Density: 51.81/km^{2} (134.2/sq mi)
- Time zone: UTC+02:00 (EET)
  - Summer (DST): UTC+03:00 (EEST)
- Postal code: 607400
- Area code: +(40) 0234
- Vehicle reg.: BC
- Website: www.parincea.ro

Parincea is a commune in Bacău County, located in the Western Moldavia region of Romania. It consists of ten villages: Barna, Mileștii de Jos, Mileștii de Sus, Nănești, Năstăseni, Parincea, Poieni, Satu Nou, Văleni, and Vladnic.

== Geography ==
Parincea has a total area of 65.08 km^{2} (25.13 sq mi). It is situated at 46°29′N 27°6′E, within the Eastern European Time Zone (UTC+2) and observes Eastern European Summer Time (UTC+3) during daylight saving time.

== Demographics ==
According to the 2021 Romanian census, Parincea had a population of 3,372 residents, of which 1,725 were male and 1,647 were female. The population distribution was as follows:

- 0–14 years: 565 individuals
- 15–64 years: 2,217 individuals
- 65 and above: 590 individuals

== Administration ==
Parincea is administered as a commune within Bacău County. The local government oversees public services, infrastructure, and development projects.
