= Survivor România 2025 =

- Season 6
- Promotional poster
- Presented by: Daniel Pavel
- No. of days: 66
- No. of castaways: 26
- Winner: Ovidiu „Uwe Dai” Măcinic
- Runner-up: Vasile Petrovschi
- Location: La Romana, Dominican Republic
- No. of episodes: 36

Release
- Original network: Pro TV; Voyo
- Original release: February 3 – April 23, 2025

Additional information
- Filming dates: January 15, 2025 – 21 March 2025

Season chronology
- ← Previous; All Stars Next → Faimoși VS Războinici

Survivor România 2025 or Survivor România Înapoi la origini, is the sixth season of the Pro TV incarnation of the competitive reality TV show Survivor România.

This season the format of the game changed significantly from previous seasons, as the producers decided to follow the Mexican version of the show, which is also produced by Acun Medya. The teams were renamed and given new colors: yellow and green. This is the first time in the history of Survivor România that the division of tribes did not take place before the show's premiere.

The season premiered on 3 February 2025 and concluded on 23 April 2025. The winner was 46-year-old Ovidiu „Uwe Dai” Măcinic, a judo coach from Alba Iulia. He defeated Vasile Petrovschi at the live finale and take the grand prize of €100.000 and title of Sole Survivor. Măcinic is the oldest Survivor Romania winner. Daniel Pavel returned as host.

== Production ==
=== Development and filming ===
Like previous seasons, this sixth season is produced by Acun Media Global. The season was first announced by Daniel Pavel at the launch of the ProTV's autumn schedule. Pavel affirmed that the producers are in the process of preparing another season of Survivor România which is set to be aired at the beginning of next year. Pavel stated in an interview, "Each season of Survivor All Stars, in essence, means starting over with completely new characters, as well as new elements of storytelling within the format’s equation. So, fans of the show should expect something truly unique and unprecedented." He also said, moreover "I would really love for us to be like the Americans or the Australians, to have two formats that reinvent the show in terms of courses, visuals, and contestants, and to bring the Survivor-loving audience—because we know how much it is loved in Romania—both sportsmanship and reality show elements, in an even cooler alchemy than ever before."

Casting for this season began on September 27, 2024, and closed in November 2024. On 7 October 2024, Pro TV released the first trailer for the series, a forty-second teaser featuring Daniel Pavel on an island, where he exclaims: "Survivor experience is the spark that becomes a flame and stays with us forever. Survivor returns to its roots, stronger and more thrilling."

The full cast of Survivor România 2025 were introduced by Pro TV on December 13, 2024, through a spectacular promo created in a massive studio in Buftea. The story of the promo begins with the contestants aboard the ship "The Iron Will," sailing towards the island in the Dominican Republic. However, everything takes an unexpected turn when a powerful storm strikes, and the crew, led by their captain, Daniel Pavel, battles the raging waves. Eventually, the ship wrecks, and the contestants are forced to swim to a deserted island, where their Survivor România adventure becomes a reality.

The filming for this season was supposed to begin in the first half of January 2025, but it was postponed due to a massive drug bust in the Bayahibe port in the Dominican Republic. Local authorities confiscated 620 packages of cocaine, and this incident led to intensified controls in the area, which affected the production team's schedule. Filming resumed a few days later.

=== Wildcard ===
Like in season four, the first contestant was chosen by a public vote. On 15 November, it was announced on the show's social media pages that the public would decide the first castaway of the series through a competition on the show La Măruță. On November 18, the six contestants were revealed. The competition will last for 2 weeks when the six contestants had to compete in various elimination challenges. The public ultimately decided who would be the first castaways of the season.

=== The Urns of Destiny ===
The Urns of Destiny are a new element introduced in the format of the show. At each Tribal Council, there will be nine identical urns — four of them containing water and five containing blood. After all contestants have cast their votes, the contestant who received the most votes from the tribe must choose one of the urns and break it. If the broken urn contains blood, the contestant nominated by the tribe will go to the Elimination Duel alongside the contestant nominated by the holder of the immunity necklace. If the broken urn contains water, the contestant nominated by the tribe will have the opportunity to choose their own opponent from the remaining contestants, except for the holder of the immunity necklace.

=== The Jury and the Selection of Finalists ===
Introduced in this season, the concept of the jury means that contestants eliminated after the merge do not leave the competition permanently but instead become members of the Jury. They will continue to attend tribal councils as observers, and in the final week, through voting, they will determine the first finalist of the competition. The second finalist will be chosen in a head-to-head duel between the two remaining contestants.

=== Broadcast ===
The season is scheduled to start on February 3, 2025 on Pro TV and Voyo and was broadcast from Monday to Wednesday at 9:30 p.m.

Starting Monday, March 3, the show was air at 11:30 PM, from Monday to Wednesday on Pro TV, and one day in advance on Voyo.

== Contestants ==
Alexia Preda was chosen by fans. The remaining nineteen castaways was announced by Pro TV on December 13, 2024. Notable castaways this season include the radio host, Sebastian Coțofană and the hip-hop artist, Bitză. The list of castaways also includes tempters from Insula Iubirii, a reality show on Antena 1, such as Diandra Moga, Ema Kovács and Darius Măcinic. Roxana Chiperi was a contestant on iUmor. Another notable presence is Larisa Popa, who became famous on TikTok thanks to her collaboration with a famous personality. Darius and Ovidiu "Uwe Dai" Măcinic are the first pair of brothers to participate in the same season. The players were initially divided into two tribes by gender: the all-female Zeițe and the all-male Titani. In Episode 6, the tribes were reorganized and renamed by the two winners of the Captain's Challenge: Uwe Dai and Laurențiu.

Six contestants were added later in the game. On Week 9, the thirteen remaining players merged into one tribe, named Lupii.

List of Survivor Romania 2025 contestants
Contestant	Age	From	Occupation	Tribe					Finish	
Contestant	Age	From	Occupation	Original	Post-Swap	Switched	None	Merged	Placement	Day
Ema Kovács	33	Timișoara, Timiș	Stay-at-home mom	Zeițe	Zeițe				1st eliminated	Day 5
Alexia Preda	21	Mediaș, Sibiu	Tennis coach	Zeițe	Zeițe				2nd eliminated	Day 9
Alex Furman	25	Dornești, Suceava	Magician and tattoo artist	Titani	Titani				Medically evacuated	Day 14
Darius Măcinic	43	Alba Iulia, Alba	Judo coach	Titani	Titani	Dragonii			3rd eliminated	Day 14
Dorian Afro	32	Bucharest	Choreographer	Titani	Titani	Leoparzii			4th eliminated	Day 20
Francesca Chebuţiu	30	Târnăveni, Mureș	IT engineer	Zeițe	Titani	Dragonii			Medically evacuated	Day 21
Roxana Chiperi	37	Bucharest	Aerobics instructor	Zeițe	Zeițe	Dragonii			Quit	Day 23
Silvia Gherasim	44	Timișoara, Timiș	Personal trainer	Zeițe	Zeițe	Dragonii			5th eliminated	Day 25
Cristian Marinescu	27	Bucharest	Model	Titani	Zeițe	Leoparzii			6th eliminated	Day 31
Mario Longa	19	Cavaran, Caraș-Severin	Student	Titani	Titani	Dragonii			7th eliminated	Day 36
Filip Mastică	23	Sfântu Gheorghe, Tulcea	Restaurant owner		Titani	Leoparzii			Quit (Illness)	Day 39
Izabela Burugă	24	Râmnicu Vâlcea, Vâlcea	Bartender		Zeițe	Leoparzii			8th eliminated	Day 41
Adi Coșeru	31	Bârlad, Vaslui	Medical nurse	Titani	Titani	Leoparzii	None (Note: At the start of the individual phase of the game on Week 9, players had to earn their way into the merged tribe by either surviving the pre-merge Tribal Council or Elimination Duel.)		9th eliminated 1st jury member	Day 45
Laurențiu Troancă	27	Făgăraș, Brașov	Police academy instructor		Titani	Leoparzii	None	Lupii	10th eliminated 2nd jury member	Day 47
Sebastian Coțofană	36	Constanța, Constanța	Radio host	Titani	Titani	Dragonii	None	Lupii	11th eliminated 3rd jury member	Day 50
Mihai "Bitză" Biță	46	Bucharest	Hip-hop artist and music producer	Titani	Titani	Dragonii	None	Lupii	12th eliminated 4th jury member	Day 53
Ionela Dobre	30	Bucharest	Yoga instructor			Dragonii	None	Lupii	13th eliminated 5th jury member	Day 55
Diana Ursu	25	Chișinău, Moldova	Professional rugby player	Zeițe	Titani	Dragonii	None	Lupii	14th eliminated 6th jury member	Day 58
Larisa Popa	27	Curtea de Argeș, Argeș	Marketing specialist	Zeițe	Zeițe	Leoparzii	None	Lupii	15th eliminated 7th jury member	Day 60
Diandra Moga	28	Târgu Mureș, Mureș	Fashion designer	Zeițe	Zeițe	Leoparzii	None	Lupii	16th eliminated 8th jury member	Day 63
Ina Shan	31	Alba Iulia, Alba	Model	Zeițe	Zeițe	Dragonii	None	Lupii	17th eliminated 9th jury member	Day 63
Adina Gache	21	Constanța, Constanța	Dancer	Zeițe	Zeițe	Leoparzii	None	Lupii	18th eliminated 10th jury member	Day 65
Lea Rancz	26	Timișoara, Timiș	Personal trainer		Zeițe	Leoparzii	None	Lupii	19th eliminated 11th jury member	Day 65
Raul Săpătaru	24	Brașov, Brașov	Physical education and sports teacher			Leoparzii	None	Lupii	20th eliminated	Day 66
Vasile Petrovschi	36	Bucharest	IT engineer	Titani	Titani	Dragonii	None	Lupii	Runner-up	Day 66
Ovidiu "Uwe Dai" Măcinic	46	Alba Iulia, Alba	Judo coach	Titani	Zeițe	Dragonii	None	Lupii	Sole Survivor	Day 66

== Season summary ==
Challenge winners and eliminations by cycle
Episode(s)		Challenge winner(s)			Journey	Nominated (vote)	Eliminated	Finish
No.	Original air date	Reward	Tribal immunity	Individual immunity	Journey	Nominated (vote)	Eliminated	Finish
1–3	3-5 February 2025	Titani	Titani	Uwe Dai		Larisa (5-4-1)	Ema	1st Eliminated; Day 5
1–3	3-5 February 2025	Titani	Titani	Uwe Dai		Larisa (5-4-1)	Ema	1st Eliminated; Day 5
1–3	3-5 February 2025	Titani	Titani	Uwe Dai		Ema (1-0)	Ema	1st Eliminated; Day 5
4–6	10-12 February 2025	Titani	Titani	Adina		Alexia (4-4-1; tiebreaker) (Note: Due to a deadlocked tie a rock draw occurred between Alexia and Silvia. Alexia drew the black rock and was sent to Elimination Duel.)	Alexia	2nd Eliminated; Day 9
4–6	10-12 February 2025	Zeițe	Titani	Adina		Alexia (4-4-1; tiebreaker)	Alexia	2nd Eliminated; Day 9
4–6	10-12 February 2025	Uwe Dai (Note: Uwe Dai and Laurențiu won the Captain's Challenge and had the opportunity to form new tribes.)	Titani	Adina		Larisa (1-0)	Alexia	2nd Eliminated; Day 9
4–6	10-12 February 2025	Laurențiu	Titani	Adina		Larisa (1-0)	Alexia	2nd Eliminated; Day 9
7–9	17-19 February 2025	Zeițe	Leoparzii	Diana		Darius (7-4)	Alex	Evacuated; Day 14
7–9	17-19 February 2025	Leoparzii	Leoparzii	Diana		Francesca (1-1-0) (Note: The Urn of Destiny shattered by Darius contained water, so he chose to enter in the Elimination Duel alongside Francesca, thus denying Diana's nomination; Uwe Dai.)	Darius	3rd Eliminated; Day 14
10–12	24-26 February 2025	Dragonii	Dragonii	Izabela	Vasile (Note: During the journey on Episode 10, Izabela lost her vote at her next Tribal Council; and Vasile won a Reward Steal's Totem which can only be used in the next 3 weeks.)	Dorian (8-1)	Dorian	4th Eliminated; Day 20
10–12	24-26 February 2025	Dragonii	Dragonii	Izabela	Izabela (Note: During the journey on Episode 10, Izabela lost her vote at her next Tribal Council; and Vasile won a Reward Steal's Totem which can only be used in the next 3 weeks.)	Larisa (1-0)	Dorian	4th Eliminated; Day 20
13–15	3-5 March 2025	Dragonii	Leoparzii	Ina		Silvia (5-3)	Francesca	Evacuated; Day 21
13–15	3-5 March 2025	Dragonii	Leoparzii	Ina		Silvia (5-3)	Roxana	Quit; Day 23
13–15	3-5 March 2025	Dragonii	Leoparzii	Ina		Vasile (1-0)	Silvia	5th Eliminated; Day 25
16–18	10-12 March 2025	Dragonii	Dragonii	Adi		Cristian (3-2-1-0) (Note: Cristian played a hidden immunity idol on Filip, therefore three votes against him were not counted.)	Cristian	6th Eliminated; Day 31
16–18	10-12 March 2025	Dragonii	Dragonii	Adi		Laurențiu (1-1-0) (Note: The Urn of Destiny shattered by Cristian contained water, so he chose to enter in the Elimination Duel alongside Laurențiu, thus denying Adi's nomination; Adina.)	Cristian	6th Eliminated; Day 31
19–21	17-19 March 2025	Dragonii	Leoparzii	Uwe Dai [Ionela] (Note: As new castaway, Ionela was exempt from the nomination process.)	Uwe Dai (Note: During the journey on Episode 19, Uwe Dai won pillows for his tribe.)	Ina (5-2)	Mario	7th Eliminated; Day 36
19–21	17-19 March 2025	Survivor; Auction	Leoparzii	Uwe Dai [Ionela]	Laurențiu	Mario (2-0) (Note: The Urn of Destiny shattered by Ina contained water, so she chose to enter in the Elimination Duel alongside Mario, thus keeping Uwe Dai's nomination.)	Mario	7th Eliminated; Day 36
19–21	17-19 March 2025	Leoparzii	Leoparzii	Uwe Dai [Ionela]	Laurențiu	Mario (2-0)	Mario	7th Eliminated; Day 36
22–24	24-26 March 2025	Dragonii	Dragonii	Adi		Izabela (4-3-1)	Filip	Quit (Illness); Day 39
22–24	24-26 March 2025	Leoparzii	Dragonii	Adi		Adina (1-0)	Izabela	8th Eliminated; Day 41
25–27	31 March - 2 April 2025	None		None		Adi, Ionela, Uwe Dai (7-6-1)	Adi	9th Eliminated; 1st Jury member Day 45
25–27	31 March - 2 April 2025	Bitză, [Adina, Diana, Larisa, Lea, Ina] (Note: Combined reward and immunity challenge.)		Bitză		Laurențiu (7-5-1)	Laurențiu	10th Eliminated; 2nd Jury member Day 47
25–27	31 March - 2 April 2025	Bitză, [Adina, Diana, Larisa, Lea, Ina]		Bitză		Lea (1-0)	Laurențiu	10th Eliminated; 2nd Jury member Day 47
25–27	31 March - 2 April 2025	Vasile [Adina, Diana, Larisa, Ina, Uwe Dai]		Vasile		Bitză (7-5)	Sebastian	11th Eliminated; 3rd Jury member Day 50
25–27	31 March - 2 April 2025	Vasile [Adina, Diana, Larisa, Ina, Uwe Dai]		Vasile		Sebastian (1-0)	Sebastian	11th Eliminated; 3rd Jury member Day 50
28-30	7 - 9 April 2025	Bitză [Adina, Ina, Uwe Dai]		Vasile		Bitză (7-3-1)	Bitză	12th Eliminated; 4th Jury member Day 53
28-30	7 - 9 April 2025	Bitză [Adina, Ina, Uwe Dai]		Vasile		Uwe Dai (1-0)	Bitză	12th Eliminated; 4th Jury member Day 53
28-30	7 - 9 April 2025	Ina [Adina, Raul, Uwe Dai]		Ina		Ionela (6-3-1)	Ionela	13th Eliminated; 5th Jury member Day 55
28-30	7 - 9 April 2025	Ina [Adina, Raul, Uwe Dai]		Ina		Diandra (1-0)	Ionela	13th Eliminated; 5th Jury member Day 55
31-33	14 - 15 April 2025	Raul [Diandra, Lea, Uwe Dai, Vasile]		Vasile		Diana (6-2)	Diana	14th Eliminated; 6th Jury member Day 58
31-33	14 - 15 April 2025	Raul [Diandra, Lea, Uwe Dai, Vasile]		Vasile		Uwe Dai (1-0)	Diana	14th Eliminated; 6th Jury member Day 58
31-33	14 - 15 April 2025	Raul [Adina, Diandra, Larisa]		Raul		Uwe Dai (4-3-1)	Larisa	15th Eliminated; 7th Jury member Day 60
31-33	14 - 15 April 2025	Raul [Adina, Diandra, Larisa]		Raul		Larisa (1-1-0) (Note: The Urn of Destiny shattered by Uwe Dai contained water, so he chose to enter in the Elimination Duel alongside Larisa, thus denying Raul's nomination; Lea.)	Larisa	15th Eliminated; 7th Jury member Day 60
34-36	21 - 23 April 2025	None				None	Diandra	16th Eliminated; 8th Jury member Day 63
34-36	21 - 23 April 2025	None				None	Ina	17th Eliminated; 9th Jury member Day 63
34-36	21 - 23 April 2025	None				None	Adina	18th Eliminated; 10th Jury member Day 65
34-36	21 - 23 April 2025	None				None	Lea	19th Eliminated; 11th Jury member Day 65
34-36	21 - 23 April 2025	None				Raul, Uwe Dai (6-5-0)	Raul	20th Eliminated; Day 66
34-36	21 - 23 April 2025	None					Challenge	
34-36	21 - 23 April 2025	None					Vasile	Runner-up
34-36	21 - 23 April 2025	None					Uwe Dai	Sole Survivor

== Voting history ==
	Swapped tribes						Switched tribes																						No tribe		Merged tribe																								
Week #	1			2			3				4			5					6			7			8				9								10						11						12						
Episode #	3			6			9				12			13	14	15			18			21			23	24			25		26			27			29			30			32			33			34		35		36		
Eliminated	Nomination vote		Ema	Nomination vote		Alexia	Alex	Nomination vote		Darius	Nomination vote		Dorian	Francesca	Roxana	Nomination vote		Silvia	Nomination vote		Cristian	Nomination vote		Mario	Filip	Nomination vote		Izabela	Nomination vote	Adi	Nomination vote		Laurențiu	Nomination vote		Sebastian	Nomination vote		Bitză	Nomination vote		Ionela	Nomination vote		Diana	Nomination vote		Larisa	Diandra	Ina	Adina	Lea	Raul	Vasile	Uwe Dai
Nominated	Larisa	Ema		Alexia	Larisa			Darius	Francesca		Dorian	Larisa				Silvia	Vasile		Cristian	Laurențiu		Ina	Mario			Izabela	Adina		Adi, Ionela, Uwe Dai		Laurențiu	Lea		Bitză	Sebastian		Bitză	Uwe Dai		Ionela	Diandra		Diana	Uwe Dai		Uwe Dai	Larisa								
Vote	5-4-1	1-0 (Note: The winner of the Individual Immunity had to directly nominate a member of the tribe.)	Duel	4-4-1 (Note: Due to a deadlocked tie a rock draw occurred between Alexia and Silvia. Alexia drew the black rock and was sent to Elimination Duel.)	1-0	Duel	No vote (Note: No vote; Alex was medically evacuated. No vote occurred for his removal.)	7-4	1-1-0 (Note: The Urn of Destiny shattered by Darius contained water, so he chose to enter in the Elimination Duel alongside Francesca, thus denying Diana's nomination; Uwe Dai.)	Duel	8-1	1-0	Duel	No vote (Note: No vote; Francesca was medically evacuated. No vote occurred for her removal.)	No vote (Note: No vote; Roxana elected to quit the game. No vote occurred for her removal.)	5-3	1-0	Duel	3-2-1-0 (Note: Cristian played a hidden immunity idol on Filip, therefore three votes against him were not counted.)	1-1-0 (Note: The Urn of Destiny shattered by Cristian contained water, so he chose to enter in the Elimination Duel alongside Laurențiu, thus denying Adi's nomination; Adina.)	Duel	5-2	2-0 (Note: The Urn of Destiny shattered by Ina contained water, so she chose to enter in the Elimination Duel alongside Mario, thus keeping Uwe Dai's nomination.)	Duel	No vote (Note: No vote; Filip quit the game due to illness. No vote occurred for his removal.)	4-3-1	1-0	Duel	7-6-1	Duel	7-5-1	1-0	Duel	7-5	1-0	Duel	7-3-1	1-0	Duel	6-3-1	1-0	Duel	6-2	1-0	Duel	4-3-1	1-1-0 (Note: The Urn of Destiny shattered by Uwe contained water, so he chose to enter in the Elimination Duel alongside Larisa, thus denying Raul's nomination; Lea.)	Duel	Challenge				Duel	Challenge	
Voter	Vote																																																						
Uwe Dai	Ema	Ema	―	Larisa	—N/a	―	―	Silvia	—N/a	―	―			―	―	Silvia	—N/a	―	―			Ina	Mario	―	―	―			Adi	Won	Larisa	—N/a	―	Diana	—N/a	―	Diana	—N/a	Won	Diana	—N/a	―	Diana	—N/a	Won	Lea	Larisa	Won	Saved	Saved	Saved	Saved	Won	Sole Survivor	
Vasile	―			―			―	Darius	—N/a	―	―			―	―	Silvia	—N/a	Won	―			Ina	—N/a	―	―	―			Adi	―	Larisa	—N/a	―	Bitză	Sebastian	―	Uwe Dai	Uwe Dai	―	Diana	—N/a	―	Diana	Uwe Dai	―	Adina	—N/a	―	Saved	Saved	Saved	Saved	Saved	Runner-up	
Raul	Not in Game																					Exempt (Note: Exempt; As new castaways, Ionela and Raul were exempt from the nomination process)			―	Izabela	—N/a	―	Uwe Dai	―	Laurențiu	—N/a	―	Bitză	—N/a	―	Bitză	—N/a	―	Ionela	—N/a	―	Diana	—N/a	―	Lea	Lea	―	Saved	Saved	Saved	Saved	Eliminated		
Lea	Not in Game			On Exile			—	―			Dorian	—N/a	―	―	―	―			Cristian	—N/a	―	―			―	Adina	—N/a	―	Ionela	―	Laurențiu	—N/a	Won	Bitză	—N/a	―	Bitză	—N/a	―	Ionela	—N/a	―	Uwe Dai	—N/a	―	Uwe Dai	—N/a	―	Saved	Saved	Saved	Eliminated			
Adina	Larisa	—N/a	―	Alexia	Larisa	―	―	―			Dorian	—N/a	―	―	―	―			~~Filip~~	—N/a	―	―			―	Izabela	—N/a	Won	Ionela	―	Laurențiu	—N/a	―	Bitză	—N/a	―	Bitză	—N/a	―	Ionela	—N/a	―	Diana	—N/a	―	Uwe Dai	—N/a	―	Saved	Saved	Eliminated				
Adina	Larisa	—N/a	―	Alexia	Larisa	―	―	―			Dorian	—N/a	―	―	―	―			~~Filip~~ (Note: Adina used his vote steal advantage on Laurențiu; therefore Laurențiu was ineligible to vote whereas Adina cast two votes.)	—N/a	―	―			―	Izabela	—N/a	Won	Ionela	―	Laurențiu	—N/a	―	Bitză	—N/a	―	Bitză	—N/a	―	Ionela	—N/a	―	Diana	—N/a	―	Uwe Dai	—N/a	―	Saved	Saved	Eliminated				
Ina	Ema	—N/a	―	Alexia	—N/a	―	―	Darius	—N/a	―	―			―	―	Vasile	Vasile	―	―			Mario	Mario	Won	―	―			Adi	―	Larisa	—N/a	―	Diana	—N/a	―	Diana	—N/a	―	Diana	Diandra	―	Diana	—N/a	―	Lea	—N/a	―	Saved	Eliminated					
Diandra	Larisa	—N/a	―	Silvia	—N/a	―	―	―			Dorian	—N/a	―	―	―	―			~~Filip~~	—N/a	―	―			―	Izabela	—N/a	―	Ionela	―	Laurențiu	—N/a	―	Bitză	—N/a	―	Bitză	—N/a	―	Ionela	—N/a	Won	Diana	—N/a	―	Uwe Dai	—N/a	―	Eliminated						
Larisa	Ema	Nominated	Won	Silvia	—N/a	Won	―	―			Dorian	—N/a	Won	―	―	―			Lea	—N/a	―	―			―	Izabela	—N/a	―	Ionela	―	Laurențiu	—N/a	―	Bitză	—N/a	―	Bitză	—N/a	―	Ionela	—N/a	―	Diana	—N/a	―	Uwe Dai	—N/a	Eliminated							
Diana	―			―			―	Darius	Uwe Dai	―	―			―	―	Vasile	—N/a	―	―			Mario	—N/a	―	―	―			Adi	―	Laurențiu	—N/a	―	Bitză	—N/a	―	Bitză	—N/a	―	Ionela	—N/a	―	Uwe Dai	Nominated	Eliminated										
Ionela	Not in Game																					Exempt			―	―			Adi	Won	Laurențiu	—N/a	―	Diana	—N/a	―	Bitză	—N/a	―	Diandra	Nominated	Eliminated													
Bitză	―			―			―	Silvia	—N/a	―	―			―	―	Silvia	—N/a	―	―			Ina	—N/a	―	―	―			Adi	―	Larisa	Lea	―	Diana	Nominated	Won	Diana	Nominated	Eliminated																
Sebastian	―			―			―	Darius	—N/a	―	―			―	―	Silvia	—N/a	―	―			Ina	—N/a	―	―	―			Adi	―	Larisa	—N/a	―	Diana	―	Eliminated																			
Laurențiu	Not in Game			On Exile			―	―			Dorian	—N/a	―	―	―	―			None	—N/a	Won	―			―	Adina	—N/a	―	Ionela	―	Sebastian	Nominated	Eliminated																						
Adi	―			―			―	―			Dorian	—N/a	―	―	―	―			Adina	Adina	―	―			―	Larisa	Adina	―	Ionela	Eliminated																									
Izabela	Not in Game			On Exile			―	―			None (Note: This player lost a vote attempting to gain an advantage.)	Larisa	―	―	―	―			Cristian	—N/a	―	―			―	Adina	Nominated	Eliminated																											
Filip	Not in Game			On Exile			―	―			Dorian	—N/a	―	―	―	―			Cristian	—N/a	―	―			Quit																														
Mario	―			―			―	Silvia	—N/a	―	―			―	―	Silvia	—N/a	―	―			Ina	—N/a	Eliminated																															
Cristian	Alexia	—N/a	―	Alexia	—N/a	―	―	―			Dorian	—N/a	―	―	―	―			Adina	Laurențiu	Eliminated																																		
Silvia	Larisa	—N/a	―	Alexia	—N/a	―	―	Darius	—N/a	―	―			―	―	Vasile	Nominated	Eliminated																																					
Roxana	Ema	—N/a	―	Silvia	—N/a	―	―	Darius	—N/a	―	―			―	Quit																																								
Francesca	―			―			―	Darius	—N/a	Won	―			Evacuated																																									
Dorian	―			—			―	―			Cristian	Nominated	Eliminated																																										
Darius	―			―			―	Silvia	Francesca	Eliminated																																													
Alex	―			―			Evacuated																																																
Alexia	Larisa	—N/a	―	Silvia	Nominated	Eliminated																																																	
Ema	Larisa	—N/a	Eliminated																																																				

Final vote
Episode #	36		
Finalist	Raul	Uwe Dai	Vasile
Vote	6-5-0		
Juror	Vote		
Lea			Vasile
Adina			Vasile
Ina		Uwe Dai	
Diandra			Vasile
Larisa			Vasile
Diana			Vasile
Ionela		Uwe Dai	
Bitză		Uwe Dai	
Sebastian		Uwe Dai	
Laurențiu		Uwe Dai	
Adi			Vasile

== Controversies ==
The 2025 season of Survivor România was met with high expectations but generated numerous criticisms and controversies from viewers and former contestants. The main complaints focused on declining ratings, format changes, and the perceived loss of authenticity in the show.

=== Declining Ratings and Pro TV's Response ===
The season premiere attracted approximately 1.3 million viewers, but audience interest quickly dropped in the following days. For example, on February 17, the show recorded only 14.1 rating points, and in the following days, the numbers continued to decline. In response, Pro TV’s management called an emergency meeting with the production team in the Dominican Republic and decided to move the show to a later time slot. Starting March 3, Survivor România aired at 11:30 PM from Monday to Wednesday. This change sparked dissatisfaction among fans, who found the new airing time too late.

=== Criticism of Format Changes and Contestant Selection ===
A significant change was the removal of the traditional “Faimoșii” and “Războinicii” teams. Former contestant Lola Crudu harshly criticized these modifications, stating that the show had lost its authenticity and had become “a fake” and “cheap theater.” Additionally, producers attempted to revamp the show by including participants from other successful reality shows, such as Mireasa, Temptation Island, and Puterea dragostei. However, this strategy did not yield the expected results, and the ratings continued to drop. Moreover, the reduced budget allocated for contestants' remuneration led to the refusal of certain celebrities to participate, which further affected the show's popularity.
