= Survivor România Faimoși VS Războinici =

- Season 7
- Presented by: Adi Vasile
- No. of castaways: 31
- Winner: Gabriel Tamaș
- Runner-up: Lucian Popa
- Location: La Romana, Dominican Republic
- No. of episodes: 66

Release
- Original network: Antena 1 AntenaPlay
- Original release: 9 January – 7 June 2026

Additional information
- Filming dates: 24 December 2025 – 14 April 2026 and 7 June 2026

Season chronology
- ← Previous; 2025 Next → 2027

Survivor România Faimoși VS Războinici is the seventh season of Romanian Survivor which is airing on Antena 1 and AntenaPlay on January 9, 2026. The season finale took place live from the Dominican Republic on June 7, 2026. Following the public vote, Gabriel Tamaș was declared the winner of the competition and the €100,000 grand prize, while Lucian Popa finished as the runner-up.

== Production ==
=== Development and filming ===
This season was officially confirmed by Antena 1 on October 16, 2025, following the acquisition of the format from the rival channel Pro TV, which had aired the last four seasons After the announcement, Mihai Ioniță, CEO of Antena said "By acquiring the Survivor format, Antena 1 strengthens its position as a leader in reality show productions for Romanian audiences – such as Asia Express, Power Couple, or Temptation Island. Survivor is a competition that inspires, challenges, and brings people together through authentic stories, intense moments, and genuine emotion. In this way, Antena 1 reaffirms its commitment to delivering top-quality entertainment to its viewers."

On December 1, 2025, Adi Vasile, former handball player and currently one of the most appreciated coaches, was officially announced by Antena 1 as the new host of Survivor România. After the announcement, Vasile told the news channel Antena 1 the following: "All my life, I have been looking for new challenges, and now, I knew from the very first moment that this is the perfect format for me! Survivor is the only show that pushes contestants beyond their limits. It is an environment where mental endurance must reach high levels to perform, and physical strength is severely tested on every course. In such a fierce competition, I know I will experience every moment, just as I did during handball matches! Faimoșii vs. Războinicii represents the essence of Survivor, and that is what we will bring to the audience at home – competition, extreme situations, and people who understand the game! I look forward to seeing you with us from January!".

Filming for this season was begin in 24 December 2025 in the Dominican Republic and the premiere was scheduled for January 9, 2026

=== Broadcast ===
The season was started on January 9, 2026, on Antena 1 and AntenaPlay and is broadcasting Friday at 8:30 p.m. and Saturday and Sunday at 8:00 p.m.

The season was finishied on June 7, 2026, on Antena 1 and Antena Play at 8:00 p.m., in the final, the last 4 competitors face each other on the route, until there are 2 left, they be voted on by the Romanian public.

== Contestants ==
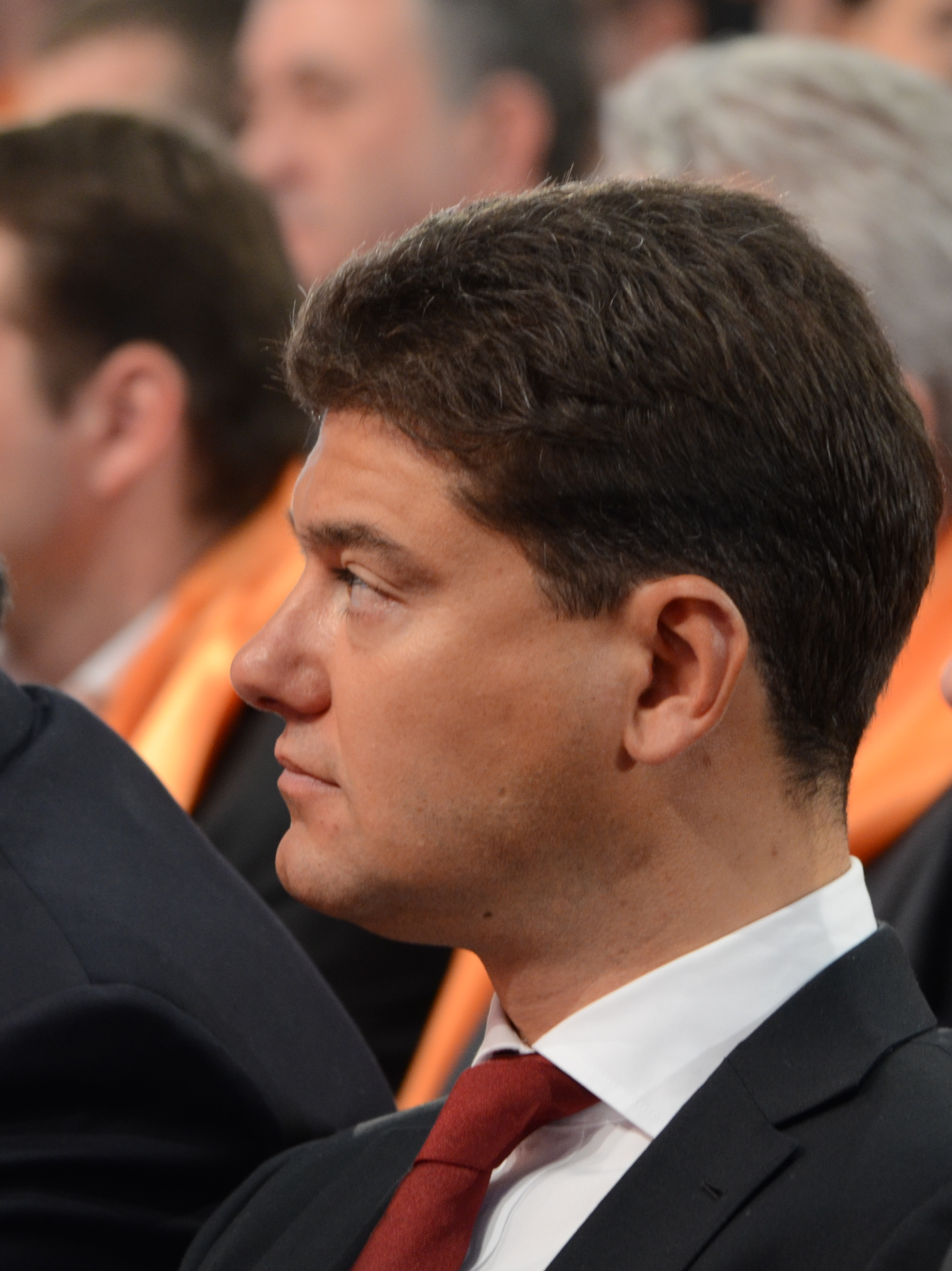
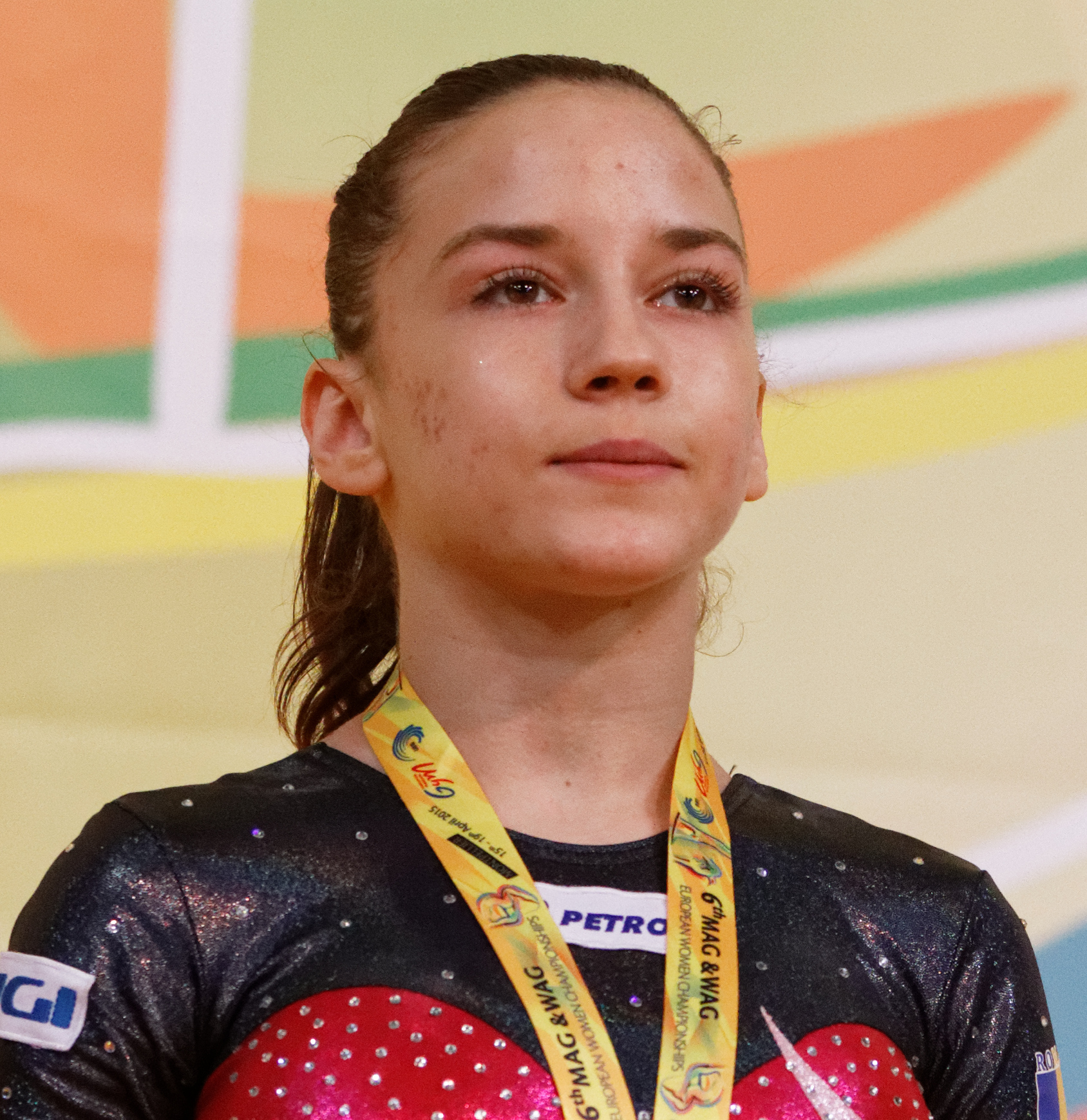
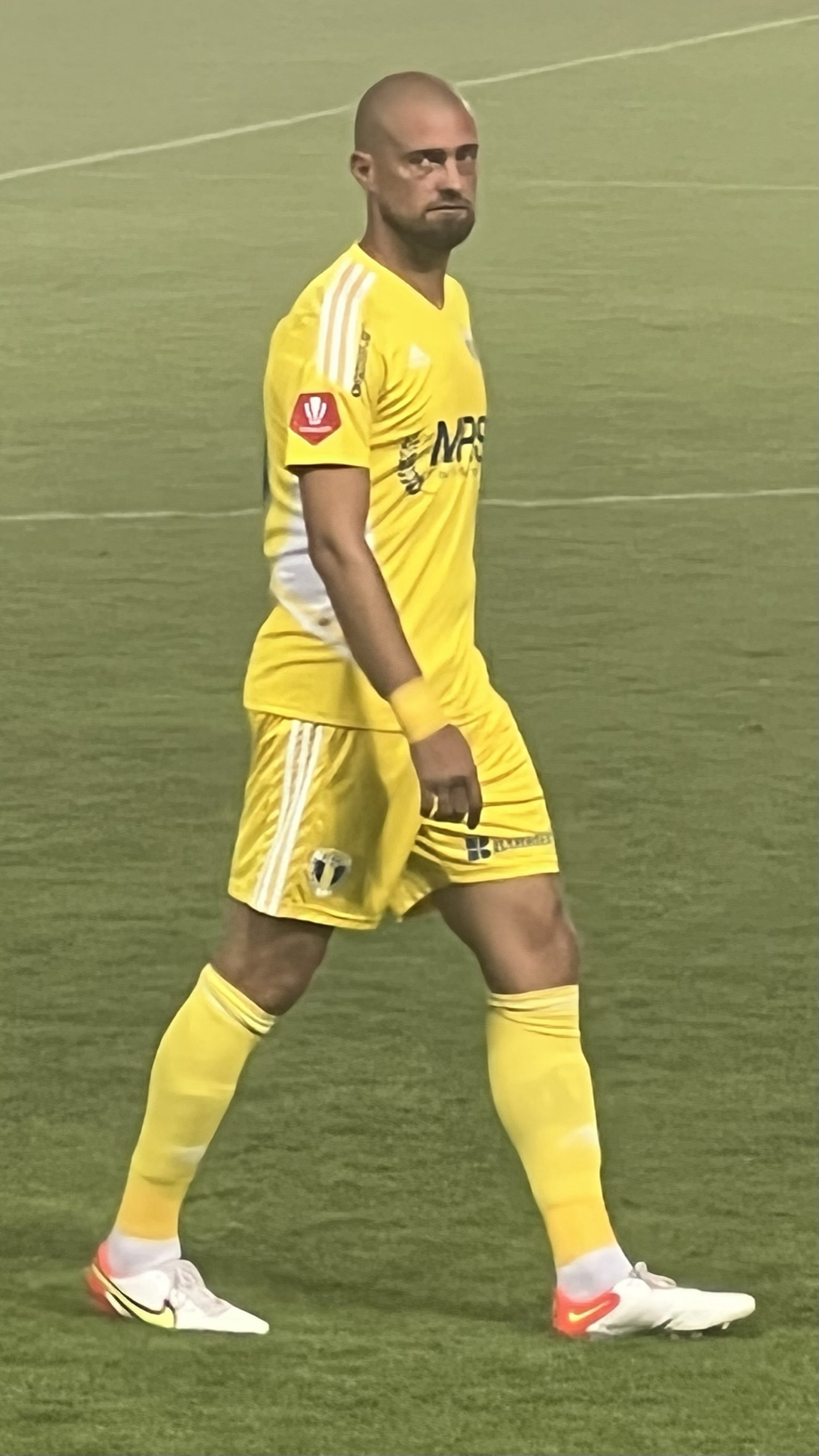
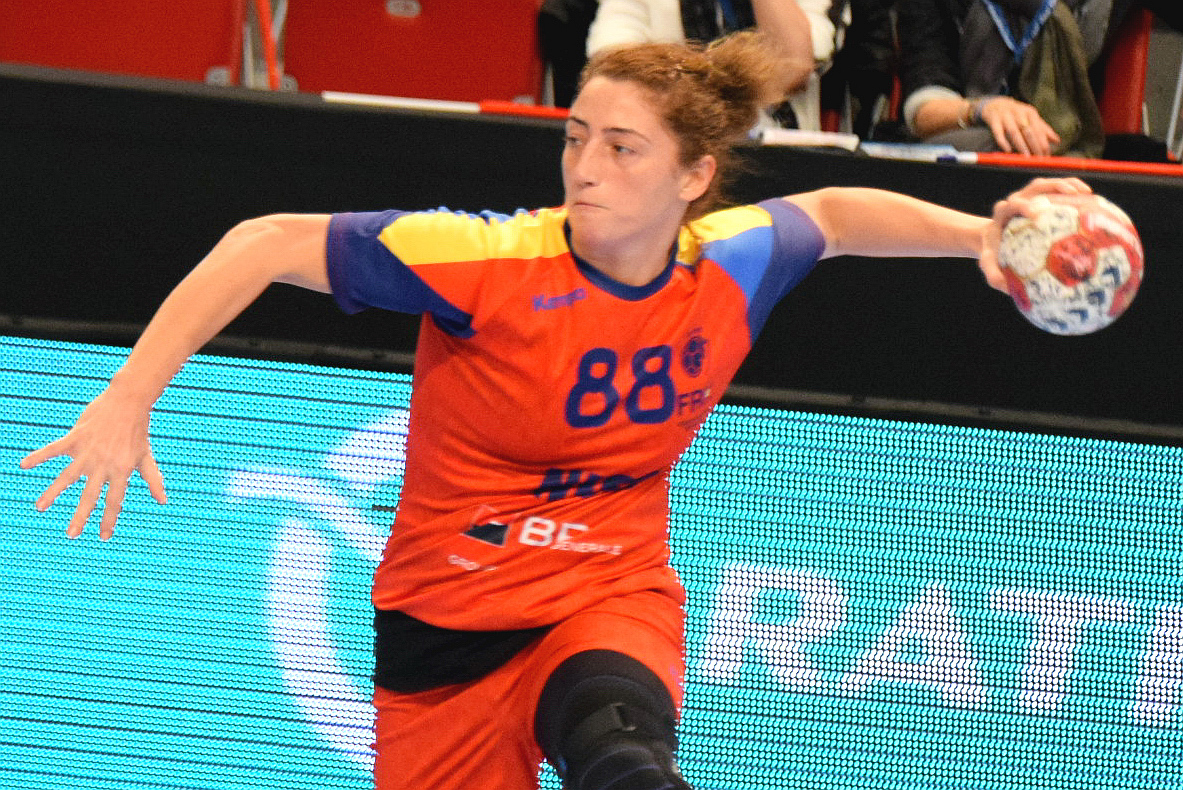
From left to right: Cristian Boureanu, Andreea Munteanu, Gabriel Tamaș and Patricia Vizitiu

The Faimoșii tribe was announced by Antena 1 on December 16, 2025. After a week, on December 23, the Războinicii tribe was also revealed. Seven contestants were added later in the game. On Week 16, the fourteenth remaining players merged into one tribe.

List of Survivor Romania Faimoși VS Războinici contestants
Contestant	Age	From	Occupation	Tribe					Finish	
Contestant	Age	From	Occupation	Original	Post-Swap (Note: After the Reward Challenge in Episode 7, each team had to nominate a player who had integrated the least. The two chosen players, Gabriel Tamaș and Andrei Beleuț, were required to switch tribes until the next Tribal Council. Given that both of them survived the Tribal Council, they both returned to their original tribes.)	Original #2	Exlie	Merged	Placement	Day
Iustin Hvnds	35	Bucharest	Singer and songwriter	Faimoșii					1st eliminated	Day 5
Iulia Istrate	32	Dumbrăvița, Timiș	Chef	Războinicii					2nd eliminated	Day 11
Yasmin Awad	33	Bucharest	Beauty content creator and makeup artist	Faimoșii	Faimoșii				Medically evacuated	Day 16
Roxana Condurache	38	Iași, Iași	Actress	Faimoșii	Faimoșii				3rd eliminated	Day 16
Marina Dina	39	Bucharest	Former TV assistant	Faimoșii	Faimoșii	Faimoșii			4th eliminated	Day 20
Călin Donca	41	Brașov, Brașov	Businessman	Faimoșii	Faimoșii	Faimoșii			Medically evacuated	Day 26
Niky Salman	38	Ploiești, Prahova	Fitness instructor	Războinicii	Războinicii	Războinicii			5th eliminated	Day 26
Larisa Uță	48	London, United Kingdom	Personal trainer	Faimoșii	Faimoșii	Faimoșii			6th eliminated	Day 32
Adrian Petre	27	Arad, Arad	Footballer	Războinicii	Războinicii	Războinicii			7th eliminated	Day 37
Naba Salem	31	Oradea, Bihor	TV personality	Faimoșii	Faimoșii	Faimoșii			Medically evacuated	Day 41
Nicu Grigore	38	Bucharest	Talent manager	Războinicii	Războinicii	Războinicii			Medically evacuated	Day 46
Adrian Kaan	34		Entrepreneur	Războinicii	Războinicii	Războinicii			8th eliminated	Day 46
Vicențiu "Cav" Andronache	47	Galați, Galați	Manager			Războinicii			9th eliminated	Day 50
Andrei Beleuț	34	Pitești, Argeș	Restaurant manager	Războinicii	Faimoșii	Războinicii			10th eliminated	Day 55
Loredana Pălănceanu	29	Iași, Iași	Math teacher	Războinicii	Războinicii	Războinicii			11th eliminated	Day 61
Ceanu Zheng	26	Deva, Hunedoara	Content creator	Faimoșii	Faimoșii	Faimoșii			12th eliminated	Day 66
Olga Barcari	39	Bucharest	Hairstylist			Faimoșii	Exile		13th eliminated	Day 77
Alberto Hangan	29	Bistrița, Bistrița-Năsăud	Actor	Războinicii	Războinicii	Războinicii	Războinicii	Los Niños	14th eliminated	Day 82
Patrice Cărăușan	27	Bucharest	Medical school graduate	Războinicii	Războinicii	Războinicii	Războinicii	Los Niños	15th eliminated	Day 86
Marian Godină	39	Brașov, Brașov	Policeman			Faimoșii	Exile	Los Niños	16th eliminated	Day 91
Aris Eram	22	Bucharest	TV presenter	Faimoșii	Faimoșii	Faimoșiin	Faimoșii	Los Niños	17th eliminated	Day 96
Maria Dumitru	24	Bucharest	Judo coach			Războinicii	Războinicii	Los Niños	18th eliminated	Day 101
Gigi Nicolae	32	Ploiești, Prahova	Fast-food owner			Războinicii	Războinicii	Los Niños	19th eliminated	Day 106
Cristian Boureanu	53	Bucharest	Politician	Faimoșii	Faimoșii	Faimoșii	Faimoșii	Los Niños	20th eliminated	Day 108
Andreea Munteanu	27	Bustuchin, Gorj	Gymnast			Faimoșii	Faimoșii	Los Niños	21st eliminated	Day 108
Bianca Giurcanu	30	Bucharest	Flight attendant			Faimoșii	Faimoșii	Los Niños	22nd eliminated	Day 109
Bianca Stoica	19	Slănic, Prahova	Physical education student	Războinicii	Războinicii	Războinicii	Războinicii	Los Niños	23rd eliminated	Day 109
Ramona Micu	27	Focșani, Vrancea	Team leader customer care	Războinicii	Războinicii	Războinicii	Războinicii	Los Niños	24th eliminated	Day 110
Patricia Vizitiu	37	Petroșani, Hunedoara	Professional handballer	Faimoșii	Faimoșii	Faimoșii	Faimoșii	Los Niños	25th eliminated	Day 111
Lucian Popa	43	Craiova, Dolj	Sports coach	Războinicii	Războinicii	Războinicii	Războinicii	Los Niños	Runner-up	Day 111
Gabriel Tamaș	42	Brașov, Brașov	International footballer	Faimoșii	Războinicii	Faimoșii	Faimoșii	Los Niños	Sole Survivor	Day 111

== Season summary ==
Challenge winners and eliminations by cycle
Episode(s)		Challenge winner(s)			Journey	Nominated (vote)	Eliminated	Finish
No.	Original air date	Reward	Tribal immunity	Individual immunity	Journey	Nominated (vote)	Eliminated	Finish
1–3	9-11 January 2026	Faimoșii	Războinicii	Marina		Larisa (7-3-2)	Iustin	1st Eliminated; Day 5
1–3	9-11 January 2026	Faimoșii	Războinicii	Marina		Larisa (7-3-2)	Iustin	1st Eliminated; Day 5
1–3	9-11 January 2026	Războinicii	Războinicii	Marina		Iustin (1-0)	Iustin	1st Eliminated; Day 5
4-6	16-18 January 2026	Faimoșii	Faimoșii	Alberto		Niky (6-3-2-1)	Iulia	2nd Eliminated; Day 11
4-6	16-18 January 2026	Faimoșii	Faimoșii	Alberto		Iulia (1-0)	Iulia	2nd Eliminated; Day 11
7-9	23-25 January 2026	Faimoșii	Războinicii	Beleuț		Cristian (4-3-1-1-1)	Yasmin	Evacuated; Day 16
7-9	23-25 January 2026	Războinicii	Războinicii	Beleuț		Roxana (1-0)	Roxana	3rd Eliminated; Day 16
10-12	30 January-1 February 2026	Faimoșii	Războinicii	Larisa		Cristian (4-3-1)	Marina	4th Eliminated; Day 20
10-12	30 January-1 February 2026	Faimoșii	Războinicii	Larisa		Marina (1-0)	Marina	4th Eliminated; Day 20
13-15	6-8 February 2026	Faimoșii	Faimoșii	Ramona		Niky (11-1-0 (Note: Beleuț played a hidden immunity idol on himself; therefore, one vote for him was not counted.))	Călin	Evacuated; Day 26
13-15	6-8 February 2026	Faimoșii	Faimoșii	Ramona		Lucian (1-0)	Niky	5th Eliminated; Day 26
16-18	13-15 February 2026	Războinicii	Războinicii	Andreea		Larisa (7-1-1)	Larisa	6th Eliminated; Day 32
16-18	13-15 February 2026	Războinicii	Războinicii	Andreea		Cristian (1-0)	Larisa	6th Eliminated; Day 32
19-21	20-22 February 2026	Faimoșii	Faimoșii	Maria		Adrian (10-1-1)	Adrian	7th Eliminated; Day 37
19-21	20-22 February 2026	Survivor Auction	Faimoșii	Maria		Adrian (10-1-1)	Adrian	7th Eliminated; Day 37
19-21	20-22 February 2026	Faimoșii	Faimoșii	Maria		Lucian (1-0)	Adrian	7th Eliminated; Day 37
22-24	27 February - 1 March 2026	Războinicii	Faimoșii	Alberto	Patrice (Note: Following the journey, Aris and Patrice each received one half of a Hidden Immunity Idol. The idol can only be used once the two halves are combined. It is valid for the next four Tribal Councils.)	Kaan (9-1-0 (Note: Aris activated the Hidden Immunity Idol and played it for Beleuț; therefore, one vote for Beleuț was not counted.))	Naba	Evacuated; Day 41
22-24	27 February - 1 March 2026	Faimoșii	Faimoșii	Alberto	Aris	Nicu (1-0)	After Nicu’s injury, the Elimination; Duel was stopped and no one was eliminated on Week 8	
25-27	6 - 8 March 2026	Faimoșii	Faimoșii	Loredana		Kaan (6-3-1)	Nicu	Evacuated; Day 46
25-27	6 - 8 March 2026	Războinicii	Faimoșii	Loredana		Alberto (1-0)	Kaan	8th Eliminated; Day 46
28-30	13 - 15 March 2026	Războinicii	Faimoșii	Beleuț		Cav (7-2)	Cav	9th Eliminated; Day 50
28-30	13 - 15 March 2026	Războinicii	Faimoșii	Beleuț		Lucian (1-0)	Cav	9th Eliminated; Day 50
28-30	13 - 15 March 2026	Războinicii	Faimoșii	Beleuț		Lucian (1-0)	Cav	9th Eliminated; Day 50
31-33	20 - 22 March 2026	Faimoșii	Faimoșii	Maria		Beleuț (8-1)	Beleuț	10th Eliminated; Day 55
31-33	20 - 22 March 2026	Războinicii	Faimoșii	Maria		Lucian (1-0)	Beleuț	10th Eliminated; Day 55
34-36	27 - 29 March 2026	Războinicii	Faimoșii	Alberto [Gigi, Lucian] (Note: According to the new rules of the show, the difference between the number of girls and boys cannot exceed two people, in order to maintain balance in the competition.)		Ramona (7-1)	Loredana	11th Eliminated; Day 61
34-36	27 - 29 March 2026	Războinicii	Faimoșii	Alberto [Gigi, Lucian]		Loredana (1-0)	Loredana	11th Eliminated; Day 61
37-39	3 - 5 April 2026	Faimoșii	Războinicii	Marian		Bianca G. (6-3)	Ceanu	12th Eliminated; Day 66
37-39	3 - 5 April 2026	Războinicii	Războinicii	Marian		Ceanu (1-0)	Ceanu	12th Eliminated; Day 66
40-42	10 - 12 April 2026	Faimoșii	Războinicii	Bianca G.		Marian (7-1)	Marian	Exiled; Day 70 (Note: On Days 70 and 75, the tribe that lost immunity voted to send a tribemate to Exile Beach. On Day 76, after the merge party. the two exiled castaways dueled, with the winner returning to the tribe and the loser being officially eliminated form the game. Marian and Olga were exiled. Marian won the duel, officially eliminating Olga.)
40-42	10 - 12 April 2026	Războinicii	Războinicii	Bianca G.		Andreea (1-0)	Marian	Exiled; Day 70
43-45	17 - 19 April 2026	Războinicii	Războinicii	Gabriel		Olga (5-1-0 (Note: Ramona played a hidden immunity idol on Cristian, therefore one vote against him were not counted.))	Olga	Exiled; Day 75
43-45	17 - 19 April 2026	Faimoșii	Războinicii	Gabriel		Andreea (1-0)	Olga	Exiled; Day 75
46-48	24 - 26 April 2026	Unification				Marian, Olga (No vote)	Olga	13th Eliminated; Day 77
46-48	24 - 26 April 2026	Maria; Aris, Gabriel, Gigi, Patrice, Patricia, Ramona		Marian		Lucian (9-4-1)	Alberto	14th Eliminated; Day 82
46-48	24 - 26 April 2026	Maria; Aris, Gabriel, Gigi, Patrice, Patricia, Ramona		Marian		Alberto (1-0)	Alberto	14th Eliminated; Day 82
49-51	1 - 3 May 2026	Aris, Patricia (Note: Capitan's challenge)		Gabriel		Bianca S., Patrice (5-5-1-1-1)	Patrice	15th Eliminated; Day 86
49-51	1 - 3 May 2026	Patricia; Andreea, Bianca S., Cristian, Gabriel, Lucian, [Aris]		Gabriel		Bianca S., Patrice (5-5-1-1-1)	Patrice	15th Eliminated; Day 86
49-51	1 - 3 May 2026	Gabriel; Andreea, Aris, Cristian, Bianca S., Patricia, Ramona		Gabriel		Ramona (1-0)	Patrice	15th Eliminated; Day 86
52-54	8 - 10 May 2026	Andreea, Maria		Lucian		Marian (9-2-1)	Marian	16th Eliminated; Day 91
52-54	8 - 10 May 2026	Maria; Aris, Bianca S., Gabriel, Gigi, Patricia		Lucian		Marian (9-2-1)	Marian	16th Eliminated; Day 91
52-54	8 - 10 May 2026	Survivor Auction		Lucian		Gabriel (1-0)	Marian	16th Eliminated; Day 91
52-54	8 - 10 May 2026	Gabriel; Bianca S. Cristian, Gigi, Patricia, Ramona		Lucian		Gabriel (1-0)	Marian	16th Eliminated; Day 91
55-57	15 - 17 May 2026	Aris, Lucian		Gabriel		Lucian (9-1-1)	Aris	17th Eliminated; Day 96
55-57	15 - 17 May 2026	Aris; Andreea, Bianca G., Bianca S., Cristian, Gabriel		Gabriel		Lucian (9-1-1)	Aris	17th Eliminated; Day 96
55-57	15 - 17 May 2026	Aris, Andreea, Bianca G., Bianca S., Cristian, Gabriel		Gabriel		Aris (1-0)	Aris	17th Eliminated; Day 96
55-57	15 - 17 May 2026	Lucian; Bianca G., Bianca S., Cristian, Patricia		Gabriel		Aris (1-0)	Aris	17th Eliminated; Day 96
58-60	22 - 24 May 2026	Andreea, Maria		Lucian [Cristian, Gabriel, Gigi]		Bianca S., Ramona (4-4-1-1)	Maria	18th Eliminated; Day 101
58-60	22 - 24 May 2026	Andreea; Bianca G., Bianca S., Gabriel, Gigi		Lucian [Cristian, Gabriel, Gigi]		Bianca S., Ramona (4-4-1-1)	Maria	18th Eliminated; Day 101
58-60	22 - 24 May 2026	Lucian; Andreea, Bianca G., Gigi, Maria		Lucian [Cristian, Gabriel, Gigi]		Maria (1-0)	Maria	18th Eliminated; Day 101
61-63	29 - 31 May 2026	Lucian, Ramona		Andreea		Ramona (5-4)	Gigi	19th Eliminated; Day 106
61-63	29 - 31 May 2026	Lucian; Bianca S., Gigi, Patricia		Andreea		Ramona (5-4)	Gigi	19th Eliminated; Day 106
61-63	29 - 31 May 2026	Lucian; Bianca S., Gigi, Ramona		Andreea		Gigi (1-0)	Gigi	19th Eliminated; Day 106
64-66	5 - 7 June 2026	None					Cristian	20th Eliminated; Day 108
64-66	5 - 7 June 2026	None					Andreea	21st Eliminated; Day 108
64-66	5 - 7 June 2026	None					Bianca G.	22nd Eliminated; Day 109
64-66	5 - 7 June 2026	None					Bianca S.	23rd Eliminated; Day 109
64-66	5 - 7 June 2026	None					Ramona	24th Eliminated; Day 110
64-66	5 - 7 June 2026	None					Patricia	25th Eliminated; Day 111
64-66	5 - 7 June 2026	None					Public vote	
64-66	5 - 7 June 2026	None					Lucian	Runner-up
64-66	5 - 7 June 2026	None					Gabriel	Sole Survivor

== Episodes ==
fnineth

No. overall	No. in series	Title	Original release date	RO viewers (millions)
399	1	"Episode 1"	9 January 2026	1.28
The show premiered with 24 contestants divided into two tribes of twelve new players divided by status: "Faimoșii" (overachievers) & "Războinicii" (underdogs).: Reward Challenge: In this challenge, the two tribes were divided into three equal groups. The first group swam from the farthest point in the sea, after which the teams worked together to unlock ropes attached to a wooden frame and a metal claw. Using the ropes, the contestants crossed a bridge one at a time and, in the final stage, formed a rope chain to pull two pyramids up poles, raising a ring to complete the course. The "Faimoșii" tribe finished first and won fire as a reward.; Back at their camps, the members of each tribe began working on building their shelter. In the "Războinicii" tribe, Nicu took on the role of leader in organizing the shelter construction, which caused dissatisfaction for Iulia. At the same time, Beleuț attempted, without success, to start a fire. In the "Faimoșii" tribe, two leaders with conflicting visions emerged: Călin and Cristian, whose differing approaches created tension within the tribe.: Reward Challenge: This challenge was a speed-based competition in which members of both tribes competed individually. Contestants started from the farthest point of the course, where two mats were positioned. The course began with a series of obstacles, followed by a climbing section featuring suspended rings, through which each contestant was required to pass using the ring corresponding to their tribe’s color. After completing the climbing section, contestants crossed a bridge and crawled through a netted area before reaching the final throwing stage. Using sandbags, contestants aimed at a target that, once hit, lowered and opened a box. After opening a box, a ball had to be thrown into it. Each contestant had three boxes and was required to place one ball in each to score points. The "Faimoșii" tribe was the first to reach a score of seven, winning bananas, nails, and coconuts as a reward.
400	2	"Episode 2"	10 January 2026	N/A
Tribal Immunity Challnege: In this challenge, the contestants started from two flags placed at the farthest point of the course. The first stage required them to cross parallel balance beams, followed by passing over a seesaw and moving through a sloped area, which they had to climb up and then descend. Next, the contestants crawled through a muddy area, after which they continued along a narrow beam, where maintaining balance was essential. The course then continued with crawling through a mini labyrinth. In the final stage of the challenge, the contestants used balls to knock down all the bowling pins placed on a bowling table. The "Războinicii" tribe was the first to reach a score of 10 and won immunity.; Individual Immunity Challenge: In this challenge, the contestants had to stand on an unstable platform, placing both feet on it. According to the rules, they were allowed to touch the wooden surface only with their knees, while remaining in an upright position. At Adi’s signal, the participants were given wooden pieces and had 10 seconds to place them, one by one, on the pedestals located to their right and left. The challenge continued until all but one contestant lost their balance and were eliminated. Marina managed to remain standing until the end, thereby winning the immunity necklace.
401	3	"Episode 3"	11 January 2026	1.12
Reward Challenge: Facing off one against one in a fenced off circle, a castaway from each tribe would hold a wooden idol on top of a platform that they would hold in one hand. They would use the other free hand to attempt to knock their opponent's idol off the platform. The castaway whose idol hit the ground last would score one point for their tribe. The "Războinicii" tribe was the first to reach a score of 7 and they won the supplies.; Upon returning to the tribe, Iustin expressed his desire to leave the competition, while Cristian attempted to gather votes against Călin. In the end, during the Tribal Council, Larisa was named the tribe’s nomination, while Iustin was sent to a duel by Marina.: Elimination duel: The two duelists start from the farthest point of the course, where two wooden platforms are positioned. They move through a series of obstacles, including wooden blocks, a balance section, and wooden beams. At the end of the course, the competitors reach a wooden platform, where they use sticks to knock down nine hourglasses. Each round is won by the contestant who knocks down all the hourglasses first. Larisa won the two required rounds, eliminating Iustin from the competition.
402	4	"Episode 4"	16 January 2026	N/A
Reward Challenge: In this challenge, a team of four contestants carries their designated teammate across an obstacle course. Along the way, the carried contestant must retrieve two balls from pouches placed along the course. After completing the course, using the retrieved balls, the contestant must knock down five blocks. At the same time, an opponent pushes a large ball in an attempt to block the throws. The "Faimoșii" tribe was the first to reach a score of 10 and they won the supplies.; During the challenge, Naba fell from the platform and was transported to the hospital for medical observation.
403	5	"Episode 5"	17 January 2026	N/A
Naba rejoined her tribe after an injury. Subsequently, Gabriel and Călin accused Larisa of attempting to form alliances following her nomination.: Tribal Immunity Challenge: One contestant from each team started the course, where they had to overcome several obstacles involving beams until reaching the midpoint, where they completed a puzzle. After finishing it, the contestants crawled under a net to reach the end of the course. The challenge concluded with knocking down six totems using a disc, which then had to be placed into a holder. The "Faimoșii" tribe was the first to reach a score of 10 and won immunity; Individual Immunity Challenge: Castaways balanced a ball on a cylinder and held it in place with two wooden handles on each side. Alberto was the last person left standing with his ball intact an won immunity.
404	6	"Episode 6"	18 January 2026	1.20
Reward Challenge: One by one, each contestant positions themselves on a seesaw and is pushed by a teammate. From this unstable position, the contestants must throw balls, each ball needing to land in one of the nine squares placed in front of them. The team that succeeds in placing the first five valid balls is declared the winner. The "Faimoșii" tribe was the first to reach five points and wins the reward, which consists of vegetables.; At the Tribal Council, Niky was the tribe’s nomination and enters the duel alongside Iulia, chosen by Alberto, with both considered the weakest links of the team.: Elimination duel: The elimination duel course consists of obstacles in the shape of cylinders and beams, which the two duelists must cross to reach the final section. There, they must knock down five pins using a ball, and once completed, they must place two balls into two suspended baskets. Niky wins both rounds of the duel, eliminating Iulia from the competition.
405	7	"Episode 7"	23 January 2026	0.85
Before the Reward Challenge, Yasmin’s health condition worsened, and she was temporarily removed from the game for medical intervention.: Reward Challenge: In this challenge, the contestants were required to slide down a waterslide directly into a pool. After exiting the water, each contestant navigated an obstacle course consisting of balance beams, followed by a low net that they had to crawl under. The final stage of the challenge required placing three cubes, located on a table, into three corresponding bags. The point was awarded to the contestant who correctly placed all three cubes.The "Faimoșii" tribe reached a score of 10 first and won chocolate and coffee.; Immediately after the challenge, each tribe was required to nominate a member whom they believed had integrated the least within the team. From the "Războinicii" tribe, Beleuț volunteered for nomination. Although the "Faimoșii" tribe’s choice was Larisa, as she had not integrated into the tribe, Gabriel nevertheless volunteered for the tribe in order to protect Larisa, a gesture that caused confusion and indignation within the tribe. The two were required to switch tribes until the next Tribal Council. Additionally, they received clue who will help them on their new tribe. After returning to camp, Călin accused Larisa of cowardice, stating that if the tribe loses tribal immunity, she will be the next to be eliminated.
406	8	"Episode 8"	24 January 2026	1.09
Tribal Immunity Challenge: During the challenge, each contestant who enters the course must retrieve a flag placed on a net and then, by crossing a zip line, reach a puzzle that must be solved. Once the puzzle is completed, the contestant, assisted by a teammate, must place one ball into each of the two baskets using wooden platforms. The point is awarded to the contestant who is the first to successfully place both balls.; Individual Immunity Challenge: Castaways used their foot to balance a ball at the end of a beam. If their ball dropped, they were out. The last one standing won immunity.; Beleuț won individual immunity. Upon returning to camp, Beleuț takes advantage of his teammates’ inattention and finds the hidden immunity idol from the "Faimoșii" tribe. The idol can be used only for himself and only at the next two Tribal Councils that his tribe loses.
407	9	"Episode 9"	25 January 2026	1.13
Reward Challenge: The contestants were required to jump from a pontoon into the water and complete a floating obstacle course. At the end of the course, they had to cross a climbing section made of a net, followed by a short slide. The final stage consisted of sliding three discs so that two of them landed in the two basketball hoops. The point was awarded to the contestant who first managed to score both discs. The "Războinicii" tribe was the first to reach a score of 7, winning the reward.; Upon returning to the tribe, the alliance formed by Călin, Aris, Roxana and Marina decided that Larisa should be the next contestant eliminated, planning for her to face Cristian in the Duel. The alliance began gathering votes against Cristian, who was set to become the tribe’s Duel nomination, alongside Larisa, who was expected to be nominated by Beleuț. However, Larisa and Cristian attempted to persuade Beleuț to send Roxana to the duel instead of Larisa, considering her a weak link, in order to destabilize Călin’s alliance. At the Tribal Council, Yasmin announced that, for medical reasons, she could no longer continue the game and left the competition. After her removal, Cristian pointed out the existence of the alliance and its intention to eliminate the others one by one. In the end, despite Beleuț having promised to nominate Larisa, he unexpectedly nominated Roxana, sending her to the duel alongside Cristian.: Elimination duel: The course consisted of a zigzag section that had to be completed in order to reach a balance area made up of a beam, above which large balls were hanging and had to be removed. In the final stage of the course, the contestants were required to knock down eight cubes using a disc. The challenge was played in two rounds, with the first contestant to knock down all the cubes winning a round. Cristian won the duel, sending Roxana home.
408	10	"Episode 10"	30 January 2026	0.87
After returning to the "Războinicii" tribe, Beleuț was criticized by his teammates for the decision to nominate Roxana for the duel, as she was considered a better pawn for them, since their chances against her were higher in the future challenges. Before the reward challenge, Călin was injured after falling from a tree and was taken out of the tribe to receive medical care.: Reward Challenge: One by one, the contestants from both teams had to climb a water- and foam-covered slide and slide down into a pool of water. After exiting the pool, they had to run to the final stage of the challenge, where they had to throw and secure two balls onto a wooden structure. The point was awarded to the contestant who managed to secure both balls first. Helped by Larisa and Aris, who scored each time, the "Faimoșii" were the first to reach a score of 10 and won the reward, which consisted of fruits, pancakes, and croissants.
409	11	"Episode 11"	31 January 2026	N/A
Tribal Immunity Challenge: Each contestant who entered the course had to complete an individual challenge. The task consisted of retrieving two balls, which the contestants had to carry to the final point of the race. At the end of the course, the two balls had to be placed on a mini catapult, from where they were launched one by one into two wooden baskets. The contestant who managed to place both balls into the baskets first earned one point for their team. The challenge continued until one team reached a total of 10 points. The "Războinicii" tribe were the first team to reach the score of 10 and won the challenge, thus securing immunity.; Individual Immunity Challenge:The castaways would balance their feet on a narrow perch while holding handles above their heads, with the last player remaining winning immunity. Larisa lasted the longest and won immunity.
410	12	"Episode 12"	1 February 2026	N/A
Four new contestants, Andreea, Cav, Maria, and Marian, have entered the game on Exile Island, where they will live until they join the two tribes.: Reward Challenge: During the challenge, each contestant who enters the course is positioned in a boat. The boat is guided by two teammates, who steer it through the obstacles on the sea. The contestant in the boat must collect seven balls and place them in a net. After reaching the shore, the main contestant arranges the balls on a mat and continues to the final part of the challenge, where they must throw and secure two beanbags onto two wooden poles. The contestant who is the first to secure both beanbags earns one point for their team. The "Faimoșii" reach a score of five points first and win the reward.; At the Tribal Council, the tribe nominates Cristian to enter the duel, viewing him as the weakest among the men, while Marina is sent to the duel by Larisa’s vote, as she is seen as the weakest woman in the tribe.: Elimination duel: For the duel, the contestants compete on a course consisting of a zigzag section and a balance section made up of balls that must be pushed aside, as well as a beam, in order to reach the final part of the course. In this stage, using wooden sticks, the contestants must knock down five balls without toppling the three or four cubes on which the balls are placed. Cristian is the first to complete both rounds of the duel and remains in the competition, while Mariana becomes the fourth contestant eliminated from the game.
411	13	"Episode 13"	6 February 2026	1.05
In the "Faimoșii" tribe, Cristian is criticized by Naba for his poor performance during the challenges, stating that she sees him as truly determined only in the Elimination Duels. Meanwhile, the four new contestants leave Exile Island and join the two main tribes: Cav and Maria are assigned to the "Războinicii" tribe, while Marian and Andreea join the "Faimoșii" tribe.: Reward Challenge: Each contestant entering the course must pass through a series of obstacles, including balance beams, until reaching the final point. There, they must throw several small bags into a net, from which the bags must strike and knock down three pins. The contestant who knocks down all the pins first earns a point for their tribe. Both tribes reached the mixed relay stage, where the pair consisting of Gabriel and Larisa completed the challenge ahead of Loredana and Alberto, securing the reward for the "Faimoșii" tribe.
412	14	"Episode 14"	7 February 2026	N/A
Tribal Immunity Challenge: During this challenge, each contestant entered the water course one at a time, jumping from the starting pontoon into the ocean. After entering the water, the contestants climbed onto a floating course made up of beams and a boat, which they had to use to move themselves to a second pontoon. From there, they jumped into the ocean again and swam to the end of the course. At the end of the challenge, each contestant had to throw three ropes with balls attached at the ends and secure them onto metal bars. The point was awarded to the contestant who successfully secured all three ropes first. The "Faimoșii" tribe was the first to reach a score of 10 and won the immunity challenge.; Individual Immunity Challenge: During this challenge, the contestants had to balance on a wooden beam while keeping a ball balanced on two ropes attached to wooden handles. The contestant who managed to keep the ball balanced for the longest time won the immunity challenge. Ramona lasted the longest and won the challenge.
413	15	"Episode 15"	9 February 2026	N/A
Reward Challenge: During this challenge, each contestant had to remain with their hands and feet fixed on iron bars positioned on a suspended wooden platform that gradually tilted. The contestant who lasted the longest earned a point for their tribe. The Faimoșii tribe was the first to reach a score of 7 and won the reward challenge.; During the Tribal Council, Călin was permanently removed from the game for medical reasons, while Bianca G. entered the competition as a member of the "Faimoșii" tribe. Cav stated that Adrian, Kaan, and Nicu form a “love triangle” within the tribe and attempted to manipulate the other contestants in order to reach the merge. Beleuț played his Hidden Immunity Idol for himself, negating a single vote cast against him. At her own request, Niky was nominated for the Elimination Duel, alongside Lucian, who was nominated by Ramona.: Elimination duel:In this duel, the two contestants had to complete a course that included a zig-zag section, a beam, and folding doors, which the duelists had to pass through to reach the end of the course. There, they had to knock down three triangles using small sacks. The contestant who won both rounds first won the duel. Lucian is the first to complete both rounds of the duel and remains in the competition, while Niky becomes the fifth contestant eliminated from the game.
414	16	"Episode 16"	13 February 2026	0.78
Reward Challenge: The course consisted of two common obstacles, after which each contestant had to pass under a door to reach the next shared obstacle. This was followed by a climbing section, where the participants were required to pull down a flag. The final stage involved placing two balls into basketball hoops positioned behind a wooden panel. The contestant who successfully scored both balls first earned one point for their team. "Războinicii" was the first to reach 10 points, winning the reward at stake, as well as a bed that they will keep in their tribe for two weeks.
415	17	"Episode 17"	14 February 2026	1.04
Tribal Immunity Challenge: The course included two zig-zag sections, a slope, and a mud pool, which the contestants had to pass through in order to reach the final stage of the game. In the decisive round, the participants used balls to break six ceramic tiles. The first contestant to successfully knock down all six tiles scored a point for their team. "Războinicii" was the first to reach 10 points and won immunity.; Individual Immunity Challenge: The castaways would brace themselves with their arms between two walls while standing barefoot on two foot pegs. The last castaway standing on their pegs would win. Andreea lasted the longest and won the challenge.
416	18	"Episode 18"	15 February 2026	1.13
Reward Challenge: Each contestant will stand on a beam placed above a pool, trying to destabilize their opponent. Whoever lasts the longest earns a point for their team. "Războinicii" were the first to reach 7 points and won the reward.; After being accused by her tribe of bringing negative energy to the team, Larisa asked Andreea to nominate her for the Duel because she wants to go home. At the same time, she refused to take part in the tribe’s organized discussions, which sparked even more tension among her teammates. At the Council, the tribe respected Larisa’s wish and voted to send her to the Duel. Alongside her, Cristian was also nominated, as he was chosen by Andreea.: Elimination duel: The two duelists had to complete a course consisting of a zig-zag section, followed by an unstable area, then a beam and a small maze. At the end, they had to knock down the 7 balls using rings. The first to win both rounds remained in the competition. Cristian won the Elimination Duel for the third time, while Larisa became the sixth player eliminated from the game.
417	19	"Episode 19"	20 February 2026	0.88
Reward Challenge: For this course, each contestant had to start from the shore and run along a route set in the ocean, which also included a shared section for both competitors. This was followed by a net obstacle they had to climb and then jump into the water. After that, they had to crawl under another net placed on the beach to reach the final point of the game. The challenge ended with placing 5 wooden totems into 5 small bags. The first contestant to correctly place all 5 totems earned a point for their team. "Faimoșii" were the first to reach 10 points and won 2,000 pesos per person for the Survivor Auction, in which both tribes participated. During the Survivor Auction, Ceanu and Adrian won in secret a Hidden Immunity Idol available for the next three Tribal Councils and Bianca S. won the opportunity to speak with a loved one.
418	20	"Episode 20"	21 February 2026	N/A
Tribal Immunity Challenge: For this challenge, the contestants had to complete a course made up of several obstacles, including a climbing section and an unstable platform that they had to cross while holding onto a metal cable above their heads, followed by another unstable area. The final stage consisted of knocking down 10 cubes placed on a table using balls. The contestant who managed to knock down all 10 cubes first earned a point for their team. "Faimoșii" were the first to reach 10 points and won the weekly immunity.; Individual Immunity Challenge: In this challenge, the contestants were required to keep a ball balanced on a wooden board, using two ropes to control its movement. Each participant had to carefully coordinate their motions to ensure that the ball remained on the board for as long as possible without falling. The winner of the challenge was the contestant who managed to keep the ball balanced for the longest period of time. In the end, Maria won individual immunity.
419	21	"Episode 21"	22 February 2026	N/A
Reward Challenge: In this challenge, each contestant stood on a wooden platform placed in a pool, holding a large foam ball. The objective was to knock their opponent off the platform by using the ball to destabilize them. For each successful attempt, the team earned one point. The first team to reach 10 points won the challenge. Faimoșii reached this score first and secured immunity.; After Kaan exposed Ramona for allegedly trying to form a girls’ alliance, he then targeted Alberto, stating that he wanted to face him in the Duel in order to eliminate him from the competition. Later, Adrian admitted that he wanted to go home because he missed his family and asked his teammates to vote for him. At the Tribal Council, the tribe respected Adrian’s wish and nominated him for the Duel. Alongside him, Lucian was also nominated, as he was Maria’s choice.: Elimination duel The duel course included a pyramid, a zig-zag section, and a balance area made up of beams. The final stage consisted of placing three discs onto the three pegs positioned in front of the contestants. The duel was played in a best-of-three format, and the first contestant to win two rounds was declared the winner. Lucian finished first and won the duel, while Adrian became the seventh contestant eliminated from the game. Before leaving the competition, Adrian secretly handed the Hidden Immunity Idol to Nicu.
420	22	"Episode 22"	27 February 2026	0.86
Naba left the tribe due to health issues that required medical attention.: Reward Challenge: In this challenge, each contestant who entered the course had to pass through a muddy swamp, slide down a water slide, then cross a balance section, followed by another muddy area. The final stage of the game consisted of knocking down eight pins using sandbags, which had to be thrown onto the top surface of a table so that they would bounce and hit the pins. The contestant who managed to knock down all eight pins first earned a point for their team. "Războinicii" were the first to reach 10 points and won the pool party.
421	23	"Episode 23"	28 February 2026	N/A
Naba returned to the tribe after undergoing medical investigations. Shortly afterward, both tribes found a bottle containing a message announcing that each tribe had to designate one member to take part in a special mission. Patrice from "Războinicii" and Aris from "Faimoșii" volunteered to go on the mission. During the mission, the two were faced with an important decision: either return to their tribes with a large bag of supplies, or choose personal protection by each receiving one half of a Hidden Immunity Idol — which would become active only when the two halves were combined — valid for the next four Tribal Councils, along with a smaller bag of supplies. The condition was that both contestants had to make the same choice; otherwise, they would return to their tribes empty-handed. Both Aris and Patrice chose personal protection and the smaller bag of supplies.: Tribal Immunity Challenge: In this challenge, each contestant started from the farthest point of the lake, where they had to cross an unstable section before reaching the shore. Once on land, they climbed onto a wooden platform, crossed an unstable net, and then completed a crawling section. The final part of the course consisted of knocking down 10 totems using discs. After all the totems were knocked down, each contestant had to shoot a ball into a basketball hoop. The first to complete the entire course earned a point for their team. "Faimoșii" were the first to reach 10 points and won the challenge.; Individual Immunity Challenge: Each contestant held a handle on which they had to stack cubes one on top of another, keeping them balanced. The contestant who remained last with the cubes still balanced in their hand won individual immunity. Alberto lasted the longest and claimed the victory.
422	24	"Episode 24"	1 March 2026	N/A
Reward Challenge: Each contestant had to maintain their balance on a cylinder suspended above a pool, with the objective of destabilizing their opponent. The participants attempted to knock their rival off balance and into the water. The contestant who fell into the water last earned a point for their team. "Faimoșii" was the first to reach a score of seven and won the reward.; After the challenge, Nicu called out Beleuț, labeling him the weak link of the tribe, arguing that he did not follow the instructions given by his teammates and blaming him for the loss. Back at camp, strategies began to intensify. The girls wavered between Cav, Beleuț, Lucian, and Kaan, while also attempting to bring Alberto over to their side in order to strengthen their position in the game. At the same time, Ramona remained in the sights of Kaan and Nicu, as she was perceived as the person trying to control and manipulate the other girls in the tribe. She was also considered, alongside Beleuț, one of the weaker links of the team. At the Tribal Council, Naba left the competition for medical reasons and Aris convinced Patrice to activate the Hidden Immunity Idol in order to save Beleuț. In the end, Kaan, who had been nominated by the tribe, was sent to the Duel alongside his ally Nicu, who had been nominated by Alberto.: Elimination duel The course included a zig-zag section, followed by a balance area, a crawling zone, and a maze. At the end, the contestants had to throw and secure two long sticks onto horizontal bars. The first to successfully fix both sticks in place won the round. The contestant who won two rounds remained in the competition. During the Duel, Nicu suffered an injury and required medical attention, which led to the interruption of the confrontation. As a result, the Duel was not resumed, and no contestant was eliminated that evening.
423	25	"Episode 25"	6 March 2026	0.87
Reward Challenge: For this challenge, the contestants start from the shore and jump into the water, swimming to a floating platform. From there, they must run to a climbing obstacle, followed by crossing an unstable balance beam. In the final stage of the course, contestants must knock down four wooden sticks using discs. The first contestant to knock down all four sticks scores a point for their team. The "Faimoșii" tribe was the first to reach a score of ten and won the reward challenge.
424	26	"Episode 26"	7 March 2026	N/A
Tribal Immunity Challenge: The course begins with a zig-zag section, followed by a climbing obstacle from which contestants must retrieve a flag. This flag unlocks a net containing a ball. Using the ball, the contestants must then cross an instability section. In the final stage of the challenge, contestants must knock down three totems placed in three basketball hoops using a suspended ball. The ball must be thrown, and as it swings back, it must hit the totem in order to knock it down. The first contestant to knock down all three totems scores a point for their team. In the end, the "Faimoșii" tribe reached the score of ten points first and won the immunity challenge. Immediately after the challenge, Cav began putting pressure on the weaker members of the team, pointing to Ramona as one of the contestants who should be nominated for elimination.; Individual Immunity Challenge: In this challenge, each contestant receives a cylinder that must be fixed into a wooden plate placed in front of them. During the game, the contestants must gradually move away along a line drawn behind them, while maintaining control of the cylinder without dropping it. During the challenge, Kaan challenged Alberto to give up winning the game so that they could enter the Elimination Duel together, and Alberto accepted Kaan’s challenge. In the end, Loredana was the last contestant remaining and won the immunity necklace.
425	27	"Episode 27"	8 March 2026	1.15
Reward Challenge: Each contestant had to push a large wooden bar until they were the first to knock down a bucket filled with water placed in front of them. The contestant who managed to knock down the bucket first scored a point for their team. The game was played to a total of seven points, and the team that reached this score first won the reward. In this challenge, the "Războinicii" team reached the score of 7 first and won the reward, which consisted of the opportunity to communicate with their loved ones.; On the "Războinicii" beach, Loredana warned Cav that she would nominate him following the remarks he made about Ramona and the other girls. Meanwhile, Kaan continued to challenge Alberto to a duel, being certain that he would be proposed by the tribe to enter the Duel. At the Tribal Council, Nicu left the competition for medical reasons. Before leaving the game, Nicu offered Kaan the Hidden Immunity Idol in order to protect him; however, Kaan refused the gift. The tribe respected Kaan’s wish, and he entered the Duel alongside Alberto, who had been nominated by Loredana.: Elimination duel For this Duel, the contestants had to go through a very long maze, followed by a cargo net, and then another maze in order to reach the final section, where they had to knock down 10 balls using sticks. The first contestant to win two rounds won the duel. Alberto was the first to win two rounds, while Kaan became the eighth contestant eliminated from the game.
426	28	"Episode 28"	13 March 2026	0.89
Olga entered the competition on the "Faimoșii" tribe, replacing Naba, who had previously been medically evacuated. While on the "Războinicii" tribe, Cav took credit for breaking up the love triangle between Kaan, Adrian, and Nicu.: Reward Challenge: For this challenge, the contestants had to slide down a waterslide directly into a pool of water. After that, they had to cross a long balance beam and then climb a net to reach the highest point of a structure. From there, they had to descend through several openings in order to reach the final stage, which consisted of knocking down ten totems using discs that had to be slid across a table. The first contestant who managed to knock down all the totems scored a point for their team. The "Războinicii" team gained a huge advantage during the challenge, which they maintained until the end, and managed to reach the score of 10 first, winning the reward.; Reward Challenge:Question game. For this challenge, four members from each tribe entered the game and were seated at podiums, where they had to answer several questions. The contestant whose answer was closest to the correct one scored a point for their team. The "Războinicii" team reached the score of 5 first and won the reward, consisting of coffee and carrot cake.
427	29	"Episode 29"	14 March 2026	N/A
On the "Faimoșii" beach, Gabriel offered Olga advice on how she should approach the game. At the same time, Olga targeted Ceanu and Marian, the latter having recently returned after medical investigations, considering them the weak links of the tribe.: Tribal Immunity Challenge: For this course, the contestants had to crawl under a crossed beam, after which they had to get past two crossed obstacles, and then cross another beam to reach the final stage. In the final stage, each contestant had to place three beanbags on an unstable platform. The first contestant who managed to place all three beanbags scored a point for their team. Lucian was the only contestant who managed to score, therefore the "Faimoșii" team reached the score of 10 first and won immunity. After the challenge, Lucian, feeling targeted for elimination, stated that because of the girls’ alliance, they did not give enough effort on the course, which is why they lost, while Cav stated that Alberto is influenced by the girls.; Individual Immunity Challenge: The course was exactly the same as in the immunity challenge, with the only difference being the final stage, where the contestants had to knock down ten totems using wooden rings. In the end, Beleuț defeated Lucian and won the necklace.
428	30	"Episode 30"	15 March 2026	N/A
Reward Challenge: For this challenge, the contestants must complete a water course, going through a small maze set on a platform to reach the shore, where they have to crawl through a cylinder. The final stage consists of knocking down six cylinders using sticks. The contestant who manages to knock them down first scores a point for their team. The "Războinicii" team reaches the score of five first and wins the reward.; During the challenge, Lucian confides in Patricia from the "Faimoșii" tribe, telling her that he is in danger of elimination because the girls control the tribe. Back at camp, Lucian accuses Ramona of planning to intentionally lose the immunity challenge in order to send him to the Duel, which puts him on the girls’ radar, as they consider him to be manipulated by Cav. At the Tribal Council, Cav receives the most votes from the team and enters the Duel alongside Lucian, who is nominated by Beleuț.: Elimination duel For this duel, the two contestants had to go through two mazes, after which they had to cross a balance area made of a net, followed by another maze. The final stage consisted of knocking down nine cubes from a table using sandbags and then placing a disc onto a peg. The first contestant to win both rounds remained in the competition. Lucian was the first to win two rounds, while Cav became the ninth contestant eliminated from the game.
429	31	"Episode 31"	20 March 2026	0.87
Gigi entered the competition on the "Războinicii" tribe, replacing Nicu, who had previously been medically evacuated.: Reward Challenge: The course includes a cylinder section where, using their hands, each contestant must remove obstacles in order to move forward. They then cross a very long balance beam, followed by a climbing section made of nets, after which they traverse a slope to reach the final stage. In the final stage, the contestants must knock down several cubes placed on a table using balls, with the main rule being that the ball must first hit the table and then the cubes. The contestant who manages to knock down the cubes first scores a point for their team. The "Faimoșii" team reaches the score of ten first and wins the reward.
430	32	"Episode 32"	21 March 2026	N/A
Tribal Immunity Challenge: The course includes a climbing section, followed by a platform with two large holes through which each contestant must enter and exit. They then cross a balance beam and climb a set of stairs while holding onto a rope above their head, in order to reach the final stage. In the final stage, each contestant must knock down several tiles using discs, in order from 1 to 5, after which they must knock down all the balls placed on a table. The first contestant to complete the course scores a point for their team. The "Faimoșii" team reaches the score of 10 first and wins immunity for the fifth consecutive time; Individual Immunity Challenge: Contestants stood on a narrow wooden perch while balancing a ball on a wooden disk. At intervals, additional balls were added. Contestants were eliminated if they fell off the beam or dropped a ball. The last one remaining won immunity. Maria won his second immunity necklace.
431	33	"Episode 33"	22 March 2026	N/A
432	34	"Episode 34"	27 March 2026	0.88
433	35	"Episode 35"	28 March 2026	1.09
434	36	"Episode 36"	29 March 2026	1.08
435	37	"Episode 37"	3 April 2026	0.75
436	38	"Episode 38"	4 April 2026	N/A
437	39	"Episode 39"	5 April 2026	N/A
438	40	"Episode 40"	10 April 2026	0.89
439	41	"Episode 41"	11 April 2026	N/A
440	42	"Episode 42"	12 April 2026	N/A
441	43	"Episode 43"	17 April 2026	N/A
442	44	"Episode 44"	18 April 2026	N/A
443	45	"Episode 45"	19 April 2026	N/A
444	46	"Episode 46"	24 April 2026	N/A
445	47	"Episode 47"	25 April 2026	N/A
446	48	"Episode 48"	26 April 2026	N/A
447	49	"Episode 49"	1 May 2026	N/A
448	50	"Episode 50"	2 May 2026	N/A
449	51	"Episode 51"	3 May 2026	N/A
450	52	"Episode 52"	8 May 2026	0.76
451	53	"Episode 53"	9 May 2026	N/A
452	54	"Episode 54"	10 May 2026	0.93
453	55	"Episode 55"	15 May 2026	N/A
454	56	"Episode 56"	16 May 2026	N/A
455	57	"Episode 57"	17 May 2026	N/A
456	58	"Episode 58"	22 May 2026	0.72
457	59	"Episode 59"	23 May 2026	N/A
458	60	"Episode 60"	24 May 2026	N/A
459	61	"Episode 61"	29 May 2026	N/A
460	62	"Episode 62"	30 May 2026	N/A
461	63	"Episode 63"	31 May 2026	N/A
462	64	"Episode 64"	5 June 2026	N/A
463	65	"Episode 65"	6 June 2026	1.06
464	66	"Episode 66"	7 June 2026	1.07

== Voting history ==
	Original tribes						Post-Swap tribes				Original tribes #2																																	Exile tribes							Merged tribe																									
Week #	1			2			3				4			5				6			7			8				9				10			11			12			13			14			15			16				17			18			19			20			21			22							
Episode #	3			6			9				12			15				18			21			24				27				30			33			36			39			42			45			46	48			51			54			57			60			63			64		65		66			
Eliminated	Nomination vote		Iustin	Nomination vote		Iulia	Yasmin	Nomination vote		Roxana	Nomination vote		Marina	Călin	Nomination vote		Niky	Nomination vote		Larisa	Nomination vote		Adrian	Naba	Nomination vote		None	Nicu	Nomination vote		Kaan	Nomination vote		Cav	Nomination vote		Beleuț	Nomination vote		Loredana	Nomination vote		Ceanu	Nomination vote		Marian	Nomination vote		Olga	Olga	Nomination vote		Alberto	Nomination vote		Patrice	Nomination vote		Marian	Nomination vote		Aris	Nomination vote		Maria	Nomination vote		Gigi	Cristian	Andreea	Bianca G.	Bianca S.	Ramona	Patricia	Lucian	Gabriel
Nominated	Larisa	Iustin		Niky	Iulia			Cristian	Roxana		Cristian	Marina			Niky	Lucian		Larisa	Cristian		Adrian	Lucian			Kaan	Nicu			Kaan	Nicu		Cav	Lucian		Beleuț	Lucian		Ramona	Loredana		Bianca G.	Ceanu		Marian	Andreea		Olga	Andreea			Lucian	Alberto		Bianca S. & Patrice	Ramona		Marian	Gabriel		Lucian	Aris		Bianca S. & Ramona	Maria		Ramona	Gigi									
Vote	7-3-2	1-0 (Note: The winner of the Individual Immunity had to directly nominate a member of the tribe.)	Duel	6-3-2-1	1-0	Duel	No vote (Note: No vote; Yasmin was medically evacuated. No vote occurred for her removal.)	4-3-1-1-1	1-0	Duel	4-3-1	1-0	Duel	No vote (Note: No vote; Călin was medically evacuated. No vote occurred for his removal.)	11-1-0 (Note: Beleuț played a hidden immunity idol on himself; therefore, one vote for him was not counted.)	1-0	Duel	7-1-1	1-0	Duel	10-1-1	1-0	Duel	No vote (Note: No vote; Naba was medically evacuated. No vote occurred for her removal.)	9-1-0 (Note: Aris activated the Hidden Immunity Idol and played it for Beleuț; therefore, one vote for Beleuț was not counted.)	1-0	Duel (Note: During the Duel, Nicu suffered an injury and required medical attention, which led to the interruption of the confrontation. As a result, the Duel was not resumed, and no contestant was eliminated that evening.)	No vote (Note: No vote; Nicu was medically evacuated. No vote occurred for his removal.)	6-3-1	1-0	Duel	7-2	1-0	Duel	8-1	1-0	Duel	7-1	1-0	Duel	6-3	1-0	Duel	7-1	1-0	Duel	5-1-0 (Note: Ramona played a hidden immunity idol on Cristian, therefore one vote against him were not counted.)	1-0	Duel	Exile duel	9-4-1	1-0	Duel	5-5-1-1-1	1-0	Duel	9-2-1	1-0	Duel	9-1-1	1-0	Duel	4-4-1-1	1-0	Duel	5-4	1-0	Duel	Challenge						Public vote	
Voter	Vote																																																																											
Gabriel	Larisa	—N/a	―	―			―	―			Aris	—N/a	―	―	―			Larisa	—N/a	―	―			―	―			―	―			―			―			―			Bianca G.	—N/a	―	Marian	—N/a	―	Olga	Andreea	―	―	Lucian	—N/a	―	Patrice	Ramona	―	Marian	—N/a	Won	—N/a (Note: This player lost their vote as another player used a block a vote advantage. Maria used her vote steal advantage on Gabriel; therefore he was ineligible to vote whereas Maria cast two votes.)	Aris	―	Ramona	—N/a	―	Ramona	—N/a	―	Saved	Saved	Saved	Saved	Saved	Saved	Sole Survivor	
Lucian	―			Iulia	—N/a	―	―	―			―			―	Niky	—N/a	Won	―			Adrian	—N/a	Won	―	Kaan	—N/a	―	―	Kaan	—N/a	―	Ramona	—N/a	Won	Beleuț	—N/a	Won	Ramona	—N/a	―	―			―			―			―	Cristian	Nominated	Won	Bianca S.	—N/a	―	Marian	Gabriel	―	Cristian	Nominated	Won	Bianca S.	Maria	―	Bianca G.	—N/a	―	Saved	Saved	Saved	Saved	Saved	Saved	Runner-up	
Patricia	Iustin	—N/a	―	―			―	Naba	—N/a	―	Cristian	—N/a	―	―	―			Larisa	—N/a	―	―			―	―			―	―			―			―			―			Bianca G.	—N/a	―	Marian	—N/a	―	Olga	—N/a	―	―	Lucian	—N/a	―	Bianca S.	—N/a	―	Marian	—N/a	―	Lucian	—N/a	―	Ramona	—N/a	―	Ramona	—N/a	―	Saved	Saved	Saved	Saved	Saved	Eliminated		
Ramona	―			Niky	—N/a	―	―	―			―			―	~~Beleuț~~	Lucian	―	―			Adrian	—N/a	―	―	Kaan	—N/a	―	―	Cav	—N/a	―	Cav	—N/a	―	Beleuț	—N/a	―	Loredana	Nominated	Won	―			―			―			―	Cristian	—N/a	―	Bianca G.	—N/a	Won	Marian	—N/a	―	Lucian	—N/a	―	Bianca G.	Nominated	Won	Bianca G.	Nominated	Won	Saved	Saved	Saved	Saved	Eliminated			
Bianca S.	―			Niky	—N/a	―	―	―			―			―	Niky	—N/a	―	―			Adrian	—N/a	―	―	Kaan	—N/a	―	―	Cav	—N/a	―	Cav	—N/a	―	Beleuț	—N/a	―	Ramona	—N/a	―	―			―			―			―	Lucian	—N/a	―	Gigi	Nominated	Won	Marian	—N/a	―	Gigi	—N/a	―	Maria	Nominated	Won	Bianca G.	—N/a	―	Saved	Saved	Saved	Eliminated				
Bianca G.	Not in Game														―			Larisa	—N/a	―	―			―	―			―	―			―			―			―			Olga	Nominated	Won	Marian	Andreea	―	Olga	—N/a	―	―	Lucian	—N/a	―	Bianca S.	—N/a	―	Marian	—N/a	―	Lucian	—N/a	―	Bianca S.	—N/a	―	Ramona	—N/a	―	Saved	Saved	Eliminated					
Andreea	Not in Game										Exiled			―	―			Larisa	Cristian	―	―			―	―			―	―			―			―			―			Bianca G.	—N/a	―	Marian	—N/a	Won	Olga	—N/a	Won	―	Lucian	—N/a	―	Bianca S.	—N/a	―	Cristian	—N/a	―	Lucian	—N/a	―	Ramona	—N/a	―	Ramona	Gigi	―	Saved	Eliminated						
Cristian	Larisa	—N/a	―	―			―	Roxana	Nominated	Won	Aris	Nominated	Won	―	―			Aris	—N/a	Won	―			―	―			―	―			―			―			―			Bianca G.	—N/a	―	Marian	—N/a	―	Andreea	—N/a	―	―	Lucian	—N/a	―	Patrice	—N/a	―	Ramona	—N/a	―	Lucian	—N/a	―	Bianca S.	—N/a	―	Ramona	—N/a	―	Eliminated							
Gigi	Not in Game																																		Beleuț	—N/a	―	Ramona	—N/a	―	―			―			―			―	Gabriel	—N/a	―	Bianca S.	—N/a	―	Marian	—N/a	―	Lucian	—N/a	―	Bianca S.	—N/a	―	Bianca G.	—N/a	Eliminated								
Maria	Not in Game										Exiled			―	Niky	—N/a	―	―			Adrian	Lucian	―	―	Kaan	—N/a	―	―	Kaan	—N/a	―	Cav	—N/a	―	Beleuț	Lucian	―	Ramona	—N/a	―	―			―			―			―	Lucian	—N/a	―	Patrice	—N/a	―	Marian	—N/a	―	Lucian	—N/a	―	Ramona	—N/a	Eliminated											
Maria	Not in Game										Exiled			―	Niky	—N/a	―	―			Adrian	Lucian	―	―	Kaan	—N/a	―	―	Kaan	—N/a	―	Cav	—N/a	―	Beleuț	Lucian	―	Ramona	—N/a	―	―			―			―			―	Lucian	—N/a	―	Patrice	—N/a	―	Marian	—N/a	―	Lucian	—N/a	―	Ramona	—N/a	Eliminated											
Aris	Larisa	—N/a	―	―			―	Cristian	—N/a	―	Cristian	—N/a	―	―	―			Larisa	—N/a	―	―			―	―			―	―			―			―			―			Olga	—N/a	―	Marian	—N/a	―	Olga	—N/a	―	―	Lucian	—N/a	―	Patrice	—N/a	―	Marian	—N/a	―	Lucian	—N/a	Eliminated														
Marian	Not in Game										Exiled			―	―			Larisa	—N/a	―	―			―	―			―	―			―			―			―			Bianca G.	Ceanu	―	Cristian	Nominated	Exiled				Returned	Lucian	Alberto	―	Patrice	—N/a	―	Cristian	Nominated	Eliminated																	
Patrice	―			Lucian	—N/a	―	―	―			―			―	Niky	—N/a	―	―			Adrian	—N/a	―	―	Kaan	—N/a	―	―	Lucian	—N/a	―	Cav	—N/a	―	Beleuț	—N/a	―	Ramona	—N/a	―	―			―			―			―	Cristian	—N/a	―	Cristian	Nominated	Eliminated																				
Alberto	―			Iulia	Iulia	―	―	―			―			―	Niky	—N/a	―	―			Adrian	—N/a	―	―	Kaan	Nicu	―	―	Kaan	—N/a	Won	Cav	—N/a	―	Beleuț	—N/a	―	Ramona	Loredana	―	―			―			―			―	Cristian	—N/a	Eliminated																							
Olga	Not in Game																															―			―			―			Bianca G.	—N/a	―	Marian	—N/a	―	~~Cristian~~	—N/a	Exiled	Eliminated																										
Ceanu	Larisa	—N/a	―	―			―	Larisa	—N/a	―	Marina	—N/a	―	―	―			Larisa	—N/a	―	―			―	―			―	―			―			―			―			Olga	—N/a	Eliminated																																	
Loredana	―			Niky	—N/a	―	―	―			―			―	Niky	—N/a	―	―			Adrian	—N/a	―	―	Kaan	—N/a	―	―	Kaan	Alberto	―	Cav	—N/a	―	Beleuț	—N/a	―	Ramona	—N/a	Eliminated																																				
Beleuț	―			Niky	—N/a	―	―	Roxana	Roxana	―	―			―	Niky	—N/a	―	―			Adrian	—N/a	―	―	Kaan	—N/a	―	―	Kaan	—N/a	―	Cav	Lucian	―	Gigi	Nominated	Eliminated																																							
Cav	Not in Game										Exiled			―	Niky	—N/a	―	―			Lucian	—N/a	―	―	Kaan	—N/a	―	―	Kaan	—N/a	―	Ramona	Nominated	Eliminated																																										
Kaan	―			Niky	—N/a	―	―	―			―			―	Niky	—N/a	―	―			Adrian	—N/a	―	―	~~Beleuț~~	Nominated	—N/a	―	Cav	Nominated	Eliminated																																													
Nicu	―			Iulia	—N/a	―	―	―			―			―	Niky	—N/a	―	―			Adrian	—N/a	―	―	Ramona	—N/a	—N/a	Evacuated																																																
Naba	Iustin	—N/a	―	―			―	Patricia	—N/a	―	Cristian	—N/a	―	―	―			Larisa	—N/a	―	―			Evacuated																																																				
Adrian	―			Niky	—N/a	―	―	―			―			―	Niky	—N/a	―	―			Kaan	Nominated	Eliminated																																																					
Larisa	Călin	Nominated	Won	―			―	Roxana	—N/a	―	Aris	Marina	―	―	―			Patricia	Nominated	Eliminated																																																								
Niky	―			Loredana	Nominated	Won	―	―			―			―	Patrice	Nominated	Eliminated																																																											
Călin	Larisa	—N/a	―	―			―	Cristian	—N/a	―	Sick Day (Note: Sick Day; Due to medical intervention by production, Călin did not attend Tribal Council but not be deemed unable to continue with the game. As he could not attend Tribal Council, he could not vote, nor be voted out.)			Evacuated																																																														
Marina	Larisa	Iustin	―	―			―	Cristian	—N/a	―	Cristian	—N/a	Eliminated																																																															
Roxana	Iustin	—N/a	―	―			―	Cristian	—N/a	Eliminated																																																																		
Yasmin	Larisa	—N/a	―	―			Evacuated																																																																					
Iulia	―			Loredana	—N/a	Eliminated																																																																						
Iustin	Călin	—N/a	Eliminated																																																																									

== Ratings ==
Episode	Original airdate	Timeslot (EET)	National				Commercial (21–54 Urban ABCD)			Source
Episode	Original airdate	Timeslot (EET)	Rank	Viewers (in thousands)	Rating (%)	Share (%)	Rank	Rating (%)	Share (%)	Source
1	January 9, 2026	Friday, 20:30	#1	1 280	7.2	19.7	#1	6.5	24.4	
2	January 10, 2026	Saturday, 20:00	#1	—N/a	6.6	17.8	#1	6.3	22.9	
3	January 11, 2026	Sunday, 20:00	#1	1 120	6.4	16.2	#2	5.9	19.0	
4	January 16, 2026	Firday, 20:30	—N/a	—N/a	—N/a	—N/a	—N/a	—N/a	—N/a	—N/a
5	January 17, 2026	Saturday, 20:00	#1	—N/a	6.3	16.4	#1	5.6	19.8	
6	January 18, 2026	Sunday, 20:00	#1	1 120	6.4	16.2	#2	5.7	17.3	
7	January 23, 2026	Firday, 20:30	#2	859	4.9	13.7	#2	4.7	16.2	
8	January 24, 2026	Saturday, 20:00	#2	1 090	6.3	16.1	#1	5.5	20.0	
9	January 25, 2026	Sunday, 20:00	#1	1 130	6.5	16.9	#1	6.2	20.8	
10	January 30, 2026	Friday, 20:30	#2	875	5.0	13.9	#2	4.5	15.4	
11	January 31, 2026	Saturday, 20:00	#1	—N/a	6.3	16.4	—N/a	—N/a	—N/a	
12	February 1, 2026	Sunday, 20:00	—N/a	—N/a	—N/a	—N/a	—N/a	—N/a	—N/a	—N/a
13	February 6, 2026	Friday, 20:30	#2	1 050	6.0	16.0	#2	5.3	16.8	
14	February 7, 2026	Saturday, 20:00	—N/a	—N/a	—N/a	—N/a	—N/a	—N/a	—N/a	—N/a
15	February 8, 2026	Sunday, 20:00	—N/a	—N/a	—N/a	—N/a	—N/a	—N/a	—N/a	—N/a
16	February 13, 2026	Friday, 20:30	#2	785	4.5	13.7	#2	4.3	14.3	
17	February 14, 2026	Saturday, 20:00	#2	1 042	6.0	16.9	#1	4.7	18.4	
18	February 15, 2026	Sunday, 20:00	#1	1 132	6.5	16.6	#1	5.9	20.2	
19	February 20, 2026	Friday, 20:30	#2	881	5.1	14.0	#2	4.0	14.1	
20	February 21, 2026	Saturday, 20:00	—N/a	—N/a	—N/a	—N/a	#1	5.4	19.4	
21	February 22, 2026	Sunday, 20:00	—N/a	—N/a	—N/a	—N/a	—N/a	—N/a	—N/a	—N/a
22	February 27, 2026	Friday, 20:30	#2	866	5.0	13.6	#2	4.5	14.8	
23	February 28, 2026	Saturday, 20:00	—N/a	—N/a	—N/a	—N/a	#1	7.4	19.8	
24	March 1, 2026	Sunday, 20:00	#1	—N/a	6.3	—N/a	—N/a	5.4	—N/a	
25	March 6, 2026	Friday, 20:30	#2	875	5.0	13.9	#2	4.0	14.0	
26	March 7, 2026	Saturday, 20:00	#1	—N/a	6.5	17.9	#1	5.7	21.8	
27	March 8, 2026	Sunday, 20:00	#1	1 150	6.5	17.9	#1	5.3	19.7	
28	March 13, 2026	Friday, 20:30	#2	898	5.2	15.1	#2	4.4	16.4	
29	March 14, 2026	Saturday, 20:00	#1	—N/a	6.1	—N/a	#1	5.7	20.2	
30	March 15, 2026	Sunday, 20:00	#1	—N/a	6.0	—N/a	#1	7.2	20.2	
31	March 20, 2026	Friday, 20:30	#2	875	5.0	14.0	#2	4.2	15.3	
32	March 21, 2026	Saturday, 20:00	—N/a	—N/a	6.5	18.1	#1	5.3	20.9	
33	March 22, 2026	Sunday, 20:00	#1	—N/a	6.5	18.1	—N/a	—N/a	—N/a	
34	March 27, 2026	Friday, 20:30	#2	889	5.1	15.5	#2	4.5	16.6	
35	March 28, 2026	Saturday, 20:00	#1	1 090	6.3	18.5	#1	5.0	20.8	
36	March 29, 2026	Sunday, 20:00	#1	1 089	6.3	17.1	#1	5.6	21.1	
37	April 3, 2026	Friday, 20:30	#2	750	4.3	12.5	#2	4.0	14.4	
38	April 4, 2026	Saturday, 20:00	—N/a	—N/a	—N/a	—N/a	—N/a	—N/a	—N/a	—N/a
39	April 5, 2026	Sunday, 20:00	—N/a	—N/a	—N/a	—N/a	—N/a	—N/a	—N/a	—N/a
40	April 10, 2026	Friday, 20:30	#2	892	5.1	15.9	#2	5.1	18.9	
41	April 11, 2026	Saturday, 20:00	—N/a	—N/a	—N/a	—N/a	#1	4.5	17.5	
42	April 12, 2026	Sunday, 20:00	#2	965	—N/a	—N/a	#2	—N/a	—N/a	
43	April 17, 2026	Friday, 20:30	#2	716	4.1	12.4	#2	3.9	14.7	
44	April 18, 2026	Saturday, 20:00	—N/a	—N/a	—N/a	—N/a	—N/a	—N/a	—N/a	—N/a
45	April 19, 2026	Sunday, 20:00	—N/a	—N/a	—N/a	—N/a	—N/a	—N/a	—N/a	—N/a
46	April 24, 2026	Friday, 20:30	#2	935	5.4	15.7	#2	4.5	16.7	
47	April 25, 2026	Saturday, 20:00	—N/a	—N/a	—N/a	—N/a	—N/a	—N/a	—N/a	—N/a
48	April 26, 2026	Sunday, 20:00	—N/a	—N/a	—N/a	—N/a	—N/a	—N/a	—N/a	—N/a
49	May 1, 2026	Friday, 20:30	—N/a	—N/a	—N/a	—N/a	—N/a	—N/a	—N/a	—N/a
50	May 2, 2026	Saturday, 20:00	—N/a	—N/a	—N/a	—N/a	—N/a	—N/a	—N/a	—N/a
51	May 3, 2026	Sunday, 20:00	—N/a	—N/a	—N/a	—N/a	—N/a	—N/a	—N/a	—N/a
52	May 8, 2026	Friday, 20:30	#2	760	4.3	14.3	#2	3.6	15.0	
53	May 9, 2026	Saturday, 20:00	—N/a	—N/a	—N/a	—N/a	—N/a	—N/a	—N/a	—N/a
54	May 10, 2026	Sunday, 20:00	#1	935	5.4	16.6	#1	4.7	19.1	
55	May 15, 2026	Friday, 20:30	—N/a	—N/a	—N/a	—N/a	—N/a	—N/a	—N/a	—N/a
56	May 18, 2026	Saturday, 20:00	—N/a	—N/a	—N/a	—N/a	—N/a	—N/a	—N/a	—N/a
57	May 17, 2026	Sunday, 20:00	—N/a	—N/a	—N/a	—N/a	—N/a	—N/a	—N/a	—N/a
58	May 22, 2026	Friday, 20:30	#2	727	4.2	13.9	#2	3.9	16.1	
59	May 23, 2026	Saturday, 20:00	—N/a	—N/a	—N/a	—N/a	—N/a	—N/a	—N/a	—N/a
60	May 24, 2026	Sunday, 20:00	—N/a	—N/a	—N/a	—N/a	—N/a	—N/a	—N/a	—N/a
61	May 29, 2026	Friday, 20:30	—N/a	—N/a	—N/a	—N/a	—N/a	—N/a	—N/a	—N/a
62	May 30, 2026	Saturday, 20:00	—N/a	—N/a	—N/a	—N/a	—N/a	—N/a	—N/a	—N/a
63	May 31, 2026	Sunday, 20:00	—N/a	—N/a	—N/a	—N/a	—N/a	—N/a	—N/a	—N/a
64	June 5, 2026	Friday, 20:30	—N/a	—N/a	—N/a	—N/a	—N/a	—N/a	—N/a	—N/a
65	June 6, 2026	Saturday, 20:00	#1	1.067	6.1	18.5	#1	4.1	18.6	
66	June 7, 2026	Sunday, 20:00	#1	1.073	6.2	20.5	#1	5.3	23.8	

== Controversies ==
=== Punta Cana Reward Incident ===
During a reward outing held outside the competition in Punta Cana, Gabriel Tamaș was involved in an incident that became one of the most controversial moments of Survivor Romania 2026. According to information that later emerged publicly, tensions and verbal confrontations occurred during the event, and Tamaș's behavior was considered inappropriate by several participants and observers of the show. Although the full details of the incident were not presented on air, the matter attracted media attention and generated extensive discussion among the show's viewers. The situation was later discussed at a Tribal Council and was brought to the contestants' attention by Adi Vasile. After reviewing the incident, the production team decided not to remove Gabriel Tamaș from the competition. Instead, he received a disciplinary sanction that barred him from participating in any rewards won by his tribe for the remainder of the season. As a result, although he remained in the game and continued to compete in immunity challenges and other aspects of the competition, Tamaș did not benefit from any further rewards after the incident. The production's decision generated mixed reactions among viewers and the media. While some considered the sanction appropriate, many commentators and fans argued that the seriousness of the incident warranted disqualification. Online discussions also included allegations that the producers had been overly lenient toward Tamaș and that he may have received preferential treatment because of his notoriety and prominent role in the season. The show's production team did not confirm these allegations and maintained its decision to keep him in the competition.
