= Mihai Biță =

Romanian rapper

Bitză
- Born: Mihai Biță; February 8, 1979 (age 47)
- Origin: Bucharest, Romania
- Genre: Hip hop
- Occupation: Rapper
- Instrument: vocals
- Years active: 2002–present
- Labels: Rebel Music, Roton Music
- Website: Bitza.ro

Mihai Biță (born February 8, 1979), better known by his stage name Bitză is a Romanian rapper. He achieved success in the early 2000s, receiving the Gold Disc in 2006 for the album Sinuciderea unui înger for selling over 15.000 units.

== Career ==
Bitză left Romania in 2014. Spain became his second home, and was the place where he found himself both professionally and personally.

In 2019, he created the song "Mama Spunea".

== Discography ==
=== Singles ===
- "Următorul Pas" (w/ Tata Vlad )
- "All Star Part One" (feat. Grasu XXL, Vd, Dj Paul, K-Gula)
- "Armele pregătite"
- "Take Me Slow" (feat. Vanessa)
- "Vorbește vinul" (feat. Cheloo)
- "Sper că n-o să fiu eu"
- "Moartea ficatului" (feat. Ombladon)
- "Vrrrrrr"
- "Punk for Life" (feat. Adrian Despot)
- "10 degete"
- "Tânăr cât mai târziu" (feat. K-Gula)
- "Musikk for a elske deg"
- "Dialog în fața poștei"
- "Bagaboanta" (feat. Freakadadisk)
- "Concluzii"
- "Sinuciderea unui înger" (feat. L.Doc)
- "Pregătire fizică" (feat. K-Gula, DJ Undoo)
- "Străin în țara mea"
- "Dialog în intersecție"
- Bitză – Nu e vina mea
- Bitză – Nu mai pot să tac
- Bitză – Copii îmbătrâniți înainte de timp
- Bitză – Rugăciune
- Bitză – N-o să vezi (feat. Deliric, Dj Paul)
- Bitză – Baladă cu feeling
- Bitză feat. Dj Paul – Rezultatul unui consum (Mâinile-n aer)
- Bitză feat. Loredana – Aripi frânte
- Bitză feat. Butch – Război în Doi
- Bitză – Război în Doi – Outro
- Bitză feat. Raku – Sufletul orașului
- Bitză feat. Junky – Alte repere
- Bitză – Din bară-n bară
- Bitză feat. Loredana – Lasă-mă să-ți arăt
- Bitză feat. Adrian Despot – Sânge bolnav
- Bitză – Nu te opri
- Bitză – În fața blocului
- Bitză – Cântecul și povestea ei
- Bitză – Cronica unei vedete
- Bitză feat. Cedry2k – Manifest
- Bitză feat. Grasu XXL – Ne schimbăm de mâine
- Bitză feat. Guess Who – Prin ochii unui trecător
- Bitză – Un vot distanță
- Bitză feat. Cabron – Nevoi urbane
- Bitză feat. Aforic – În urma noastră
- "Sinteze"
- "Generic (gen)"
- "Intro"
- Bitză – Tovarășilor (feat. Raku, Dj dox)
- Bitză – Memento Mori
- Bitză feat. Freakadadisk – Cântecul și povestea lui
- Bitză feat. Holograf – Numele tău
- "Oameni bogați"
- "piedut într-o lume mare"
- Bitză & Ombladon – Nopți albe pentru zile negre
- "Fack"
- Bitză & Minelli – Soare din nori
- "Pasiunile înving legi"
- Bitză & Planet H – Eroare matematică
- "Limite"
- Bitză feat. Alan & Kepa – Ăștia Suntem
- "Umbre"
- "Mai Departe"
- Bitză feat. Deliric – Siruri
- Bitză feat. Tata Vlad – Mama spunea
- Bitză feat. Bvcovia – Dor de Casă
- Bitză feat. Phunk B & FreakaDaDisk – Locul de unde vin
- Bitză feat. Ombladon & FreakaDaDisk – Los Maniachis
- Bitză feat. Sore - Un actor grăbit

=== Albums ===
Year	Title	Label	Units sold	Distinction
2004	Sevraj	Rebel Music		
2005	Sinuciderea unui înger	Rebel Music/Roton	+15000	Disc de Aur
2006	Fapte bune	Rebel Music	+10000	
2009	Sufletul Orașului	Intercont Music		
2010	Goana după fericire	Gazeta Sporturilor		
2014	Liniște part. 1	20CM Records		
2017	Liniște part. 2	20CM Records		
2023	Sevraj II	Roton Urban Label		
2025	INCA UNU'			

== Awards and nominations ==
Year	Event	Category	Song	Result	Note
2007	MTV Romania Music Awards	Best hip-hop artist	"Armele pregătite"	Nominated	
