= Daddy Yankee videography =

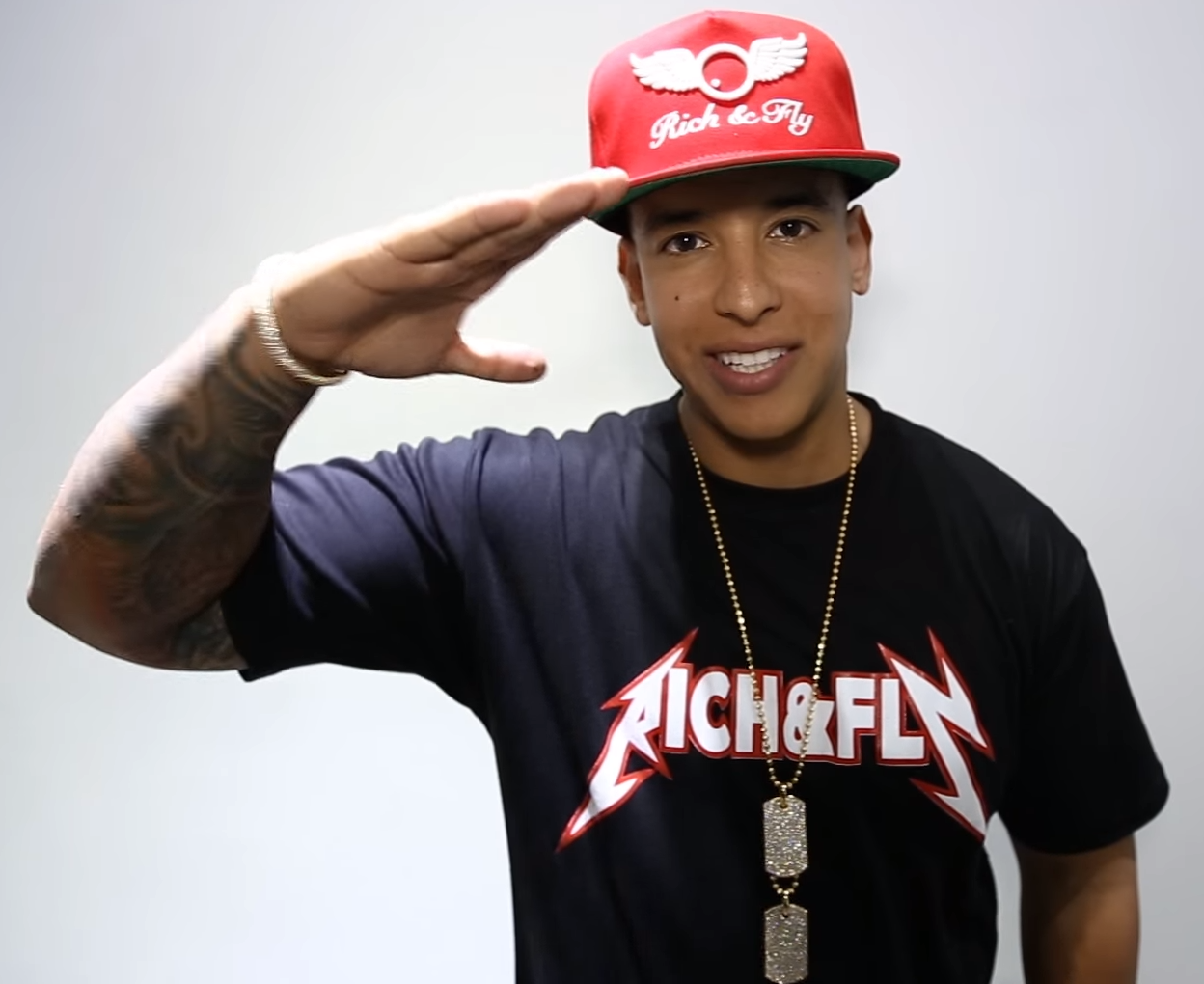
Daddy Yankee in 2015.

Puerto Rican rapper Daddy Yankee has released 98 music videos (as a lead or a featured act) and one film. His first music videos were directed for various underground mixtapes during the 1990s decade, in which he appeared as a guest artist. No videos were filmed for his debut studio album No Mercy (1995). Three clips were filmed for his second studio album El Cangri.com (2002), including "Latigazo", directed by Puerto Rican rapper and producer Eddie Dee, which introduced his music in New York City and Miami in the United States. In 2002, he made a brief appearance in the documentary Big Pun: Still Not a Player.

Four music videos were filmed for Daddy Yankee's third studio album Barrio Fino (2004). Puerto Rican directors Carlos Pérez and Kacho López-Mari directed videos for "Gasolina", "King Daddy" and "No Me Dejes Solo". Perez also directed videos "Lo Que Pasó, Pasó", "Salud y Vida", and "Corazones". That same year, Daddy Yankee made his acting debut playing Bimbo in the film Vampiros. Carlos Pérez and Dominican filmmaker Jessy Terrero directed music videos for "Rompe" and "Gangsta Zone", as well as singles for Daddy Yankee's live album Barrio Fino en Directo (2005). "Rompe" garnered a nomination for an MTV Video Music Award for Best Hip-Hop Video at the 23rd MTV Video Music Awards. Carlos Pérez directed the music videos for "Mensaje de Estado" and "Ella Me Levanto" from the rapper's fourth studio album El Cartel: The Big Boss (2007), while two versions of the single "Impacto" were directed by American filmmakers The Saline Project.

In 2008, Daddy Yankee played the protagonist Edgar "Dinero" in the film Talento de Barrio, in which he also served as executive producer. Four music videos were filmed for the film's soundtrack, including "Pose" and "Somos de Calle", directed by Jessy Terrero and George Rivera, respectively. Between 2009 and 2010, five music videos were shot for his fifth studio album Mundial. Carlos Pérez directed three clips, including "Grito Mundial" and "Descontrol", while George Rivera directed "El Ritmo No Perdona (Prende)" with Louanson Alers and "La Despedida" with Juan Esteban Suárez.

Daddy Yankee's sixth studio album Prestige (2012) spawned eight music videos. Puerto Rican director Carlos Martin shot three of them, including "Lovumba", and Puerto Rican director José "Javy" Ferrer filmed "El Amante". Carlos Pérez directed the clips for "Ven Conmigo" and "Pasarela", while Jessy Terrero handled direction for "Limbo" and "La Noche de Los Dos". Ferrer directed the clip for "La Rompe Carros" and Puerto Rican filmmaker Christian Suau directed "La Nueva y La Ex" from Daddy Yankee's mixtape King Daddy (2013).

In 2017, Daddy Yankee starred in the video for his and Puerto Rican singer Luis Fonsi's collaboration, "Despacito", which was directed by Carlos Pérez and was shot in San Juan, Puerto Rico. The clip is the most-viewed YouTube video since August 2017 and has received more than five billion views on the site. It also became the first YouTube video to receive three, four, and five billion views and the fastest video to reach two billion views in 154 days. The clip garnered a Latin Grammy Award for Best Short Form Music Video at the 18th Latin Grammy Awards and a Billboard Music Award for Top Streaming Song (Video) at the 25th Billboard Music Awards.

== Music videos ==
Title	Other performer(s)	Director(s)	Album	Year	Ref.
"El Funeral"	Ruben Sam; Rey Pirin; Buru Fat	Unknown	Playero 38	1993	
"Qué Bien Te Ves"	Mexicano 777; Rey Pirin; Kalil	Unknown	Playero 39: Respect	1995	
"Camuflash"	Don Chezina; Miguelito; Ruben Sam; Frankie Boy; Baby Rasta & Gringo	Unknown	Playero 40: New Era	1996	
"El Trío"	Mr. Notty; Yaviah	Unknown	The Flow, Vol. 1	1997	
"Posición"	Alberto Stylee	Unknown	El Cartel de Yankee	1997	
"Peligro"	None	Unknown	DJ Goldy 3: The Melody	1997	
"Todo Hombre Llorando Por Ti"	None	Unknown	Gárgolas, Vol. 1: El Comando Ataca	1998	
"Knockout"	None	Unknown	Gritos de Guerra	1999	
"Calibre de Más Poder"	None	Unknown	Gárgolas, Vol. 2: El Nuevo Comando	1999	
"Las Calles de Mi Isla"	D'Mingo	Unknown	Rumbero Soy	1999	
"Y Las Gatas / Te La Presento / No Hacen Na'"	Nicky Jam; Las Guanabanas	Unknown	Guatauba 2000	2000	
"Yo Sé Que A Ti Te Gusta / Te Quiero Tocar / Danza En La Pista"	Nicky Jam; Falo	Unknown	La Conspiración	2001	
"G-String / El Desorden / El Deseo / Toque Especial / El Deseo"	Nicky Jam; Rey Pirin; Alberto Stylee; Don Omar; Jackie	Héctor Figueroa	Warriors Vol. 3: Los Magnificos	2001	
"Tu Cuerpo En La Cama / Se Unen O Se Mueren / Nigga What-What?"	Nicky Jam; Karel & Voltio; MC Ceja	Unknown	El Cartel II: Los Cangris	2001	
"Maniatica Sexual / Sábanas Blancas / Quiero Estar Contigo"	Lito & Polaco; Nicky Jam; Maicol & Manuel	Unknown	Sandunguero, Vol. 1	2001	
"Muévete y Perrea"	None	Unknown	El Cangri.com	2001	
"Latigazo / Son Las Doce / Guayando"	Nicky Jam	Eddie Dee	El Cangri.com	2002	
"¿Recuerdas? / Dímelo / Ella Está Soltera"	Speedy; Divino; Nicky Jam	Unknown	El Cangri.com	2002	
"Gatas En La Disco / Desesperau / En La Cama"	Nicky Jam	Unknown	Haciendo Escante	2002	
"Mi Gatita y Yo"	Las Guanabanas	Héctor Figueroa	Guillaera	2002	
"Si Tú Me Calientas / Maúlla / Niña Tímida"	Yaga & Mackie; Speedy	Unknown	Sonando Diferente	2002	
"Se Activaron Los Pistoleros / Aquí Está Tu Caldo / Buscando Calor"	Wisin & Yandel; Plan B	Unknown	Blin Blin, Vol. 1	2003	
"Party de Gangsters"	None	Unknown	Babilonia: El Imperio Comienza	2003	
"Segurosqui / Gata Gangster"	Don Omar	David Impelluso	Los Homerun-es	2003	
"Cógela Que Va Sin Jockey"	None	Unknown	Más Flow	2003	
"Los 12 Discípulos"	Eddie Dee; Gallego; Vico C Tego Calderón; Julio Voltio; Ivy Queen; Zion & Lennox; Nicky Jam; Johnny Prez; Wiso G	Louis Martinez	12 Discípulos	2004	
"Saoco"	Wisin	Unknown	El Sobreviviente	2004	
"Se Activaron Los Anormales"	Divino	Omar Cruz	Todo A Su Tiempo	2004	
"Oye Mi Canto"	N.O.R.E. Nina Sky; Big Mato; Gem Star	Gil Green	N.O.R.E. y la Familia...Ya Tú Sabe	2004	
"Gasolina / King Daddy"	None	Carlos Pérez; Kacho López	Barrio Fino	2004	
"No Me Dejes Solo"	Wisin & Yandel	Carlos Pérez	Barrio Fino	2004	
"Lo Que Pasó, Pasó / Salud y Vida"	None	Unknown	Barrio Fino	2004	
"Corazones"	None	Carlos Pérez	Barrio Fino	2005	
"Taladro"	Eddie Dee	Unknown	12 Discípulos: Special Edition	2005	
"Mayor Que Yo"	Baby Ranks; Tony Tun Tun; Wisin & Yandel	Marlon Peña	Más Flow 2	2005	
"Rompe"	None	Carlos Pérez; Jessy Terrero	Barrio Fino en Directo	2005	
"Rompe" (Remix)	Lloyd Banks; Young Buck	Unknown	Non-album single	2005	
"Gangsta Zone"	Snoop Dogg	Carlos Pérez; Jessy Terrero	Barrio Fino en Directo	2006	
"Noche de Entierro (Nuestro Amor)"	Tony Tun Tun; Wisin & Yandel; Héctor el Father	Jessy Terrero	Más Flow: Los Benjamins	2006	
"Impacto"	None	The Saline Project	El Cartel: The Big Boss	2007	
"Impacto" (Remix)	Fergie	The Saline Project	El Cartel: The Big Boss	2007	
"Ella Me Levantó"	None	Carlos Pérez	El Cartel: The Big Boss	2007	
"Mensaje de Estado"	None	Carlos Pérez	El Cartel: The Big Boss	2007	
"Somos de Calle"	None	George Rivera	Talento de Barrio	2008	
"Pose"	None	Jessy Terrero	Talento de Barrio	2008	
"Somos de Calle" (Remix)	Arcángel; De La Ghetto; Ñejo; Chyno Nyno; MC Ceja; Guelo Star; Julio Voltio; Cosculluela; Baby Rasta	Carlos Martin	Non-album single	2008	
"Llamado de Emergencia"	None	Luis Enrique	Talento de Barrio	2008	
"¿Qué Tengo Que Hacer?"	None	Unknown	Talento de Barrio	2009	
"¿Qué Tengo Que Hacer?" (Remix)	Jowell & Randy	Unknown	Non-album single	2009	
"El Ritmo No Perdona (Prende)"	None	Louanson Alers; George Rivera	Mundial	2009	
"Grito Mundial"	None	Carlos Pérez	Mundial	2010	
"Somos El Mundo 25 Por Haiti"	Artists for Haiti	Unknown	Non-album single	2010	
"Descontrol"	None	Carlos Pérez	Mundial	2010	
"El Mejor de Todos Los Tiempos"	None	Carlos Pérez	Mundial	2010	
"La Despedida"	None	George Rivera; Juan Esteban Suárez	Mundial	2010	
"Ven Conmigo"	Prince Royce	Carlos Pérez	Prestige	2011	
"Llegamos a La Disco"	De La Ghetto; Ñengo Flow; Arcángel; Farruko; Baby Rasta & Gringo; Alex Kyza; Kendo Kaponi	Carlos Martin	Prestige	2011	
"Lovumba"	None	Carlos Martin	Prestige	2012	
"Aprovecha"	Nova & Jory	Carlos Martin	Mucha Calidad	2012	
"Pasarela"	None	Carlos Pérez	Prestige	2012	
"Guaya"	Arcángel	José Javy Ferrer	El Imperio Nazza	2012	
"Limbo"	None	Jessy Terrero	Prestige	2012	
"Finally Found You" (Remix)	Enrique Iglesias	Diego Hurtado de Mendoza	Sex and Love (Bailando Edition)	2012	
"Perros Salvajes"	None	Carlos Martin	Prestige	2012	
"Señorita" (Remix)	Reykon	36 Grados	Non-album single	2013	
"El Amante"	J Álvarez	José Javy Ferrer	Prestige	2013	
"La Noche de Los Dos"	Natalia Jiménez	Jessy Terrero	Prestige	2013	
"More than Friends"	Inna	Edward Aninaru	Party Never Ends	2013	
"La Rompe Carros"	None	José Javy Ferrer	King Daddy	2013	
"La Nueva y La Ex"	None	Christian Suau	King Daddy	2014	
"Moviendo Caderas"	Yandel	Carlos Pérez	De Líder a Leyenda	2014	
"Ora Por Mí"	None	Christian Suau	Non-album single	2014	
"Palabras Con Sentido"	None	José Javy Ferrer	Non-album single	2014	
"Sábado Rebelde"	Plan B	36 Grados	Non-album single	2015	
"Nota de Amor"	Wisin; Carlos Vives	Jessy Terrero	Los Vaqueros: La Trilogía	2015	
"Imaginándote"	Reykon	Christian Suau	Non-album single	2015	
"Sígueme y Te Sigo"	None	Jessy Terrero	Non-album single	2015	
"We Wanna"	Alexandra Stan; Inna	Khaled Mokhtar, David Gal y Dimitri Caceaune	Unlocked	2015	
"Andas En Mi Cabeza"	Chino & Nacho	Nuno Gomes	Non-album single	2016	
"Not a Crime"	Play-N-Skillz	José Javy Ferrer	Non-album single	2016	
"Shaky Shaky"	None	Marlon Peña	TBA	2016	
"Despacito"	Luis Fonsi	Carlos Pérez	Vida	2017	
"Otra Cosa"	Natti Natasha	Luieville & Company	La Súper Fórmula	2017	
"La Rompe Corazones"	Ozuna	Nuno Gomes	TBA	2017	
"Yo Contra Ti"	None	Kacho López	Non-album single	2017	
"La Fórmula"	De La Ghetto; Ozuna	Daniel Durán	Non-album single	2017	
"Vuelve"	Bad Bunny	Daniel Durán	TBA	2017	
"Boom Boom"	RedOne; French Montana; Dinah Jane	Saïd Naciri; Daniel Slotin	TBA	2017	
"Bella y Sensual"	Romeo Santos; Nicky Jam	Jessy Terrero	Golden	2017	
"Todo Comienza En La Disco"	Wisin & Yandel	Jessy Terrero	Victory	2018	
"Dura"	None	Carlos Pérez	TBA	2018	
"Azukita"	Steve Aoki; Play-N-Skillz; Elvis Crespo	Tyler Dunning Evans	Neon Future III	2018	
"Hielo"	None	Marlon Peña	TBA	2018	
"Zum Zum"	R.K.M. & Ken-Y; Arcángel	Marlon Peña	La Súper Fórmula	2018	
"Cómo"	Kim Viera	Carlos Pérez	TBA	2018	
"Made for Now"	Janet Jackson	Dave Meyers	TBA	2018	
"Como Soy"	Pacho; Bad Bunny	Fernando Lugo	TBA	2018	
"Asesina" (Remix)	Bryatiago; Darell; Ozuna; Anuel AA	Marlon Peña	TBA	2018	
"Adictiva"	Anuel AA	Marlon Peña	TBA	2018	
"Con Calma"	Snow	Marlon Peña	TBA	2019	
"No Lo Trates"	Pitbull; Natti Natasha	Andrew Sandler	Libertad 548	2019	
"Soltera" (Remix)	Lunay; Bad Bunny	Marlon Peña	Épico	2019	
"Runaway"	Sebastián Yatra; Natti Natasha; Jonas Brothers	Daniel Durán	TBA	2019	
"Si Supieras"	Wisin & Yandel	Nuno Gomes	TBA	2019	
"China"	Anuel AA; Karol G Ozuna; J Balvin	Marlon Peña	Emmanuel	2019	
"Que Tire Pa' Lante"	None	Marlon Peña	TBA	2019	
"Definitivamente"	Sech	Marlon Peña	TBA	2020	
"Muévelo"	Nicky Jam	Marlon Peña	Bad Boys for Life (soundtrack)	2020	

=== Upcoming ===
Title	Year	Director(s)	Ref.
"Percocet"	TBA	TBA	

== Filmography ==
=== Theatrical feature films ===
Year	Title	Role	Ref.
2002	Big Pun: Still Not a Player	Himself	
2008	Talento de Barrio	Edgar	
2018	Héctor el Father: Conocerás la Verdad	Daddy Yankee	

=== Television films ===
Year	Title	Role	Ref.
2006	My Block: Puerto Rico	Himself	
2008	Straight Outta Puerto Rico: Reggaeton's Rough Road to Glory	Himself	
2004	Vampiros	Bimbo	

=== Television ===
Year	Title	Role	Notes	Ref.
2005, 2007	Punk'd	Himself	2 episodes	
2007	Cane	Himself	1 episode	
2010	The Bold and the Beautiful	Himself	6 episodes	
2015	La Voz Kids	Himself – Coach	26 episodes	

=== Video games ===
Year	Title	Voice role	Ref.
2008	Grand Theft Auto IV	San Juan Sounds DJ	

== See also ==
- Daddy Yankee discography
