= King Daddy =

Mixtape by Daddy Yankee
- Released: October 29, 2013
- Recorded: 2013
- Genre: Reggaeton
- Length: 35:57
- Language: Spanish
- Label: El Cartel
- Producer: Daddy Yankee; Los de la Nazza

Daddy Yankee chronology
Prestige (2012)	King Daddy (2013)	Legendaddy (2022)

Singles from King Daddy
- 1. "La Nueva y La Ex" Released: October 18, 2013; 2. "La Rompe Carros" Released: December 17, 2013

King Daddy, also known as Imperio Nazza: King Daddy Edition, (Note: Although the mixtape was also referred as Imperio Nazza: King Daddy Edition, digital stores and streaming platforms list it as simply King Daddy.) is a mixtape by Puerto Rican rapper Daddy Yankee, released independently on October 29, 2013 by his label El Cartel Records, a year after his seventh studio album, Prestige. King Daddy is a "hardcore reggaeton" record made for the genre's "lovers" and features collaborations with Arcángel, Divino, Farruko, J Álvarez, and Yandel. Daddy Yankee co-wrote and co-produced all 11 tracks with Benny Benni and Los de la Nazza, respectively; it is his last album produced by the latter, who left El Cartel Records in 2014.

Two singles were released from the album, of which "La Nueva y La Ex" reached the top 10 on the Billboard Hot Latin Songs chart and was nominated for a Lo Nuestro Award for Urban Song of the Year. King Daddy peaked at number seven on the US Top Latin Albums and became the first digital-only album to debut in the top 10 of the chart. It received nominations for Best Urban Music Album at the 15th Latin Grammy Awards and the 27th Lo Nuestro Awards.

== Background and production ==
King Daddy was described by Daddy Yankee as "pure reggaeton, from A to Z," with which he wanted to "create a digital revolution" by only releasing it digitally, a usual practice among novice artists but not between established ones at the time. He referred to it as an album "dedicated to the Internet" with a "mystic flavor" and a "strong [one] for reggaeton lovers," and stated that "the Internet was the genre's new street" because "that [was] were [their] fans concentrate[d]." He saw reggaeton's evolution "going backwards" and decided to make a "hardcore reggaeton album" due to the genre's fans demanding "classic sounds" and a "hundred percent raw" reggaeton record "from one of his pillars."

The album's concept developed from Los de la Nazza's El Imperio Nazza and El Imperio Nazza: Gold Edition (both 2012), the first two editions from their Imperio Nazza mixtape series, for which fans asked on the Internet for Daddy Yankee to record his own. Los de la Nazza members Musicólogo and Menes found "La Rompe Carros" and "Calentón" to be their favorite tracks from the album, respectively. Musicólogo referred to King Daddy as the "essence of reggaeton" and a mixtape reminiscent of the past while blended with Los de la Nazza's futuristic sounds. King Daddy was Daddy Yankee's last album produced by Musicólogo and Menes—after producing Talento de Barrio (2008), Mundial (2010) and Prestige (2012)—before leaving El Cartel Records in 2014 due to a contract renewal disagreement. Daddy Yankee co-wrote all lyrics with Puerto Rican rapper and lyricist Benny Benni and the mixtape's guest features on their respective tracks.

== Release ==
King Daddy was released digitally on October 29, 2013 through Daddy Yankee's own label El Cartel Records. In the United States, it debuted and peaked at number seven on the Billboard Top Latin Albums in the week ending November 16, 2013, with 2,000 copies sold, and charted for a total of three weeks. Despite not reaching number one as previous Daddy Yankee records did, it became the chart's first digital-only album to debut in the top 10. In December 2013, Daddy Yankee stated that its success "took [him] by surprise" and it was announced that a physical version with new tracks would be released in February 2014, although it never did. The King Daddy Tour, later renamed King Daddy Euro Tour, began on May 23, 2014 in Scalea, Italy and ended on October 17, 2015 in Los Angeles, United States. Comprising 47 shows, it visited Europe twice, while making stops in the United States, Latin America and Asia.

A follow-up titled King Daddy II was announced in 2014. Scheduled to be released in 2016, the album was postponed and renamed El Disco Duro, a project that eventually led to Daddy Yankee's seventh and final studio album, Legendaddy, released in 2022.

=== Singles ===
"La Nueva y La Ex", the mixtape's lead single, was released on October 18, 2013 through a lyric video, while its music video, directed by Christian Suau, premiered on February 6, 2014. It peaked at number nine on the Billboard Hot Latin Songs, where it charted for a total of 20 weeks, and was ranked at number 40 on its year-end list. The second single, "La Rompe Carros", was released through a music video directed by José "Javy" Ferrer on December 17, 2013.

== Nominations ==
King Daddy was nominated for Best Urban Music Album at the 15th Latin Grammy Awards and Urban Album of the Year at the 27th Lo Nuestro Awards, where it lost to Calle 13's Multi_Viral and J Balvin's La Familia, respectively.

== Track listing ==
King Daddy track listing
No.	Title	Writer(s)	Producer(s)	Length
1.	"Nada Ha Cambiao'" (featuring Divino)	Ramón Ayala; Jesús Monárrez; Warden Vásquez	Daddy Yankee; Los de la Nazza	3:10
2.	"Mil Problemas"	Ayala; Monárrez	Daddy Yankee; Los de la Nazza	2:35
3.	"Calentón" (featuring Yandel)	Ayala; Monárrez; Llandel Veguilla	Daddy Yankee; Los de la Nazza	3:03
4.	"La Nueva y La Ex"	Ayala; Monárrez	Daddy Yankee; Los de la Nazza	3:17
5.	"Dónde Es El Party" (featuring Farruko)	Ayala; Monárrez; Carlos Reyes	Daddy Yankee; Los de la Nazza	3:34
6.	"La Rompe Carros"	Ayala; Monárrez	Daddy Yankee; Los de la Nazza	2:59
7.	"Millonarios" (featuring Arcángel)	Ayala; Monárrez; Austin Santos	Daddy Yankee; Los de la Nazza	3:57
8.	"Suena Boom"	Ayala; Monárrez	Daddy Yankee; Los de la Nazza	3:09
9.	"Una Respuesta" (featuring J Álvarez)	Ayala; Monárrez; Javid Álvarez	Daddy Yankee; Los de la Nazza	3:24
10.	"Déjala Caer"	Ayala; Monárrez	Daddy Yankee; Los de la Nazza	3:12
11.	"Enchuletiao'"	Ayala; Monárrez	Daddy Yankee; Los de la Nazza	3:37
Total length:				35:57

== Personnel ==
- Arcángel – vocals, songwriting (7)
- Benny Benni – songwriting (all tracks)
- Divino – vocals, songwriting (1)
- Farruko – vocals, songwriting (5)
- J Álvarez – vocals, songwriting (9)
- Los de la Nazza – producer (all tracks)
- Yandel – vocals, songwriting (3)
- Daddy Yankee – vocals, producer, songwriting (all tracks)

== Charts ==
Chart performance for King Daddy
Chart (2013)	Peak position
US Top Latin Albums (Billboard)	7
