= Musicólogo & Menes =

Puerto Rican urban music duo

- Also known as: Los de la Nazza
- Origin: San Juan, Puerto Rico
- Genres: Reggaeton; hip hop; experimental
- Years active: 2007–present
- Labels: El Cartel; Nazza; Rimas
- Members: Eliezer "Musicólogo" García; Eduardo "Menes" López
- Website: nazzaworld.com

Musicólogo & Menes, also known as Los de la Nazza, is a Puerto Rican urban music duo formed in 2005 by Eliezer "Musicólogo" García and Eduardo "Menes" López. The duo achieved significant popularity in the Latin urban music field during the late 2000s and early 2010s as producers of Puerto Rican rapper Daddy Yankee, combining elements of reggaeton music with electronic influences. Musicólogo is Daddy Yankee's cousin.

The producers were joined as a duo by Daddy Yankee in 2007 and their first production credit was on his studio album El Cartel: The Big Boss, released later that year. Los de la Nazza continued working with Daddy Yankee until 2014, having produced songs including "Pose" (2008), "La Despedida" (2010), and "Lovumba" (2011).

Musicólogo and Menes began producing a series of mixtapes titled El Imperio Nazza released from 2012 to 2016. They turned independent in 2014, in order to focus on their own careers, and released their first studio album Orión in 2015.

== History ==
Musicólogo, born Eliezer García on December 21, 1981 in Río Piedras, Puerto Rico, was raised in the Nemesio Canales Residential, where he first experienced the violence and rawness of the streets. His passion for music began during childhood due to his musician family. He graduated from the Gabriela Mistral Public School and ventured into university. Menes, born Eduardo López on August 29, 1980, in Caguas, Puerto Rico, was raised in Caguas until the age of 11, when he moved to Florida, United States with his family. He credits being the older brother of three sisters as what he needed to understand the "female language". Musicólogo and Menes first met at a recording studio in the Nemesio Canales Residential in 2005, Menes working with Puerto Rican producer Echo and Musicólogo having a solo career with his own recording studio.

In 2007, Musicólogo showed Puerto Rican rapper Daddy Yankee a demo of his work. He eventually decided to join them as a duo, subsequently signing Musicólogo & Menes to his record label El Cartel Records. Since then, Los de la Nazza produced one track on El Cartel: The Big Boss (2007) and were the main producers of Talento de Barrio (2008), Mundial (2010), Prestige (2012), and King Daddy (2013).

In January 2012, the duo released El Imperio Nazza, the first entry of a series of reggaeton mixtapes involving various artists or focused on one in particular, depending on the edition. These included Puerto Rican reggaeton acts Gotay, J Álvarez, Jowell & Randy, and Farruko. The last Imperio Nazza mixtape released under El Cartel Records was Top Secret Edition in January 2014.

In 2014, their contract with El Cartel expired and decided to start an independent career as a production duo. Their first studio album Orión was released digitally on August 11, 2015, under their own record label Nazza Records. The album peaked at number 8 on the US Latin Rhythm Albums chart on September 5, 2015. The single "Si El Mundo Se Acabara" featuring American singer Justin Quiles reached number one on the US Tropical Songs chart on April 30, 2016, being their first top spot placement on Billboard.

== Production credits ==
Title	Year	Artist	Functioned as		
Title	Year	Artist	Producer	Mixing engineer	Audio engineer
El Cartel: The Big Boss	2007	Daddy Yankee	Yes		
Talento de Barrio	2008	Daddy Yankee	Yes	Yes	Yes
Mundial	2010	Daddy Yankee	Yes	Yes	Yes
Mucha Calidad	2011	Nova & Jory	Yes		
The Most Powerful Rookie	2012	Farruko	Yes		
Prestige	2012	Daddy Yankee	Yes	Yes	Yes
King Daddy	2013	Daddy Yankee	Yes	Yes	Yes
Sentimiento, Elegancia & Maldad	2013	Arcángel	Yes		

== Charted songs ==
Title	Year	Performing artist(s)	Peak chart positions		Album
Title	Year	Performing artist(s)	US Latin	US Tropical	Album
"Grito Mundial"	2009	Daddy Yankee	24	7	Mundial
"El Ritmo No Perdona (Prende)"	2009	Daddy Yankee	47	39	Mundial
"Descontrol"	2010	Daddy Yankee	16	2	Mundial
"La Despedida"	2010	Daddy Yankee	4	4	Mundial
"Ven Conmigo"	2011	Daddy Yankee, Prince Royce	9	2	Prestige
"Lovumba"	2011	Daddy Yankee	1	2	Prestige
"Pasarela"	2012	Daddy Yankee	4	3	Prestige
"La Máquina de Baile"	2012	Daddy Yankee	42	—	Prestige
"El Amante"	2012	Daddy Yankee, J Álvarez	40	—	Prestige
"Se Acabó El Amor"	2013	J Álvarez	33	17	El Imperio Nazza: J Álvarez Edition
"La Nueva y La Ex"	2013	Daddy Yankee	9	2	King Daddy
"Si El Mundo Se Acabara"	2015	Justin Quiles	45	1	Orión
"—" denotes a recording that did not chart or was not released in that territory.

== Discography ==
Studio

- Orión (2015)
- Nazza 2020 (2020)

Mixtapes

- El Imperio Nazza (2012)
- El Imperio Nazza: Gold Edition (2012)
- El Imperio Nazza: Gotay Edition (2012) – with Gotay
- El Imperio Nazza: J Álvarez Edition (2012) – with J Álvarez
- El Imperio Nazza: King Daddy Edition (2013) – whit Daddy Yankee
- El Imperio Nazza: Doxis Edition (2013) – with Jowell & Randy
- El Imperio Nazza: Farruko Edition (2013) – with Farruko
- El Imperio Nazza: Top Secret Edition (2014)
- El Imperio Nazza: Justin Quiles Edition (2016) – with Justin Quiles
- El Imperio Nazza: Kendo Edition (2016) – with Kendo Kaponi

EP's

- Carnal Mixtape (2011) - With Carnal
- Dunvo (2019) - With Dunvo
- Rain Rose (2020)
- El Ultimo Tour Del Mundo (MYM REMAKE) (2020) - with Bad Bunny

Album Productions

- El Cartel 3: The Big Boss (2007) - Daddy Yankee - Tracks 2
- Talento De Barrio: Soundtrack (2008) - Daddy Yankee - Tracks 1–4,6,8–14
- El Fenómeno (2008) - Arcángel - Tracks 11
- Mundial (2010) - Daddy Yankee - Tracks 1–11,13
- Los Verdaderos (2010) - Zion & Lennox - Tracks 8,12
- Mucha Calidad (2011) - Nova & Jory - Tracks 3,11
- Otro Nivel De Música (2011) - J Álvarez - Tracks 14
- El Concepto (2011) - Gotay - Tracks 3}
- Otro Nivel De Musica (Reloaded) (2012) - J Alvarez - Tracks 7
- The Most Powerful Rookie (2012) - Farruko - Tracks 3,7,9–10
- Tu Juguetito Sexual (2012) - Galante El Emperador - Tracks 12–13
- Prestige (2012) - Daddy Yankee - Tracks 1–6,8–9,11–17
- El Patan (2012) - Luigi 21 Plus - Tracks 7
- Reencarnal (2013) - Carnal - All Tracks
- HD (2014) - Kent & Tony - Tracks 1–6,8–9
- Visionary (2015) - Farruko - Tracks 1–2
- Now Or Never (2020) - Nio Garcia y Casper - Track 5

Musicólogo (Solo Albums)

- Canales Reggaeton (2002) with Reyito
- Canales Malianteo (2002) with Reyito
- Canales Reggaeton Vol. 2 (2003) with Reyito
- Turbina (2003)
- Los Dueños De Los Metales (2005)

Compilation

- Los de la Nazza: The Collection, Vol. 1 (2013)
- Los de la Nazza: The Collection, Vol. 2 (2014)
- Los de la Nazza: The Collection, Vol. 3 (2017)

== Awards and nominations ==
- El Imperio Nazza: J Álvarez Edition – Lo Nuestro Award for Urban Album of the Year – Nominated (2014)
