= Segurosqui =

Single by Daddy Yankee

Single by Daddy Yankee
- Language: Spanish
- Released: 2003
- Genre: Reggaeton
- Length: 3:43
- Label: El Cartel

Daddy Yankee singles chronology
"Latigazo" (2002)	"Segurosqui" (2003)	"Gasolina" (2004)

Music video
- "Segurosqui" on YouTube

"Segurosqui" (also known as "Seguroski") is a song by Puerto Rican rapper Daddy Yankee from his first compilation album Los Homerun-es, released on September 23, 2003. A music video including "Segurosqui" and "Gata Gangster" featuring Puerto Rican singer Don Omar was directed by David Impelluso and released in order to promote the album. A remix version produced by Puerto Rican record producer Eliel was also included on the album.

"Segurosqui" was Daddy Yankee's second song to chart on Billboard after peaking at number 32 on the Tropical Airplay chart on August 23, 2003. In April 2006, Daddy Yankee stated that "When I released [the single] 'Seguroski', everyone said I couldn't do better than that. Then came 'Gasolina'. And, again, many people told me I would never do anything better than 'Gasolina'. That's what everybody has told me a thousand times over the years."

== Charts ==
Chart (2003)	Peak position
US Tropical Airplay (Billboard)	32
