= El Cartel: The Big Boss =

Studio album by Daddy Yankee
- Released: June 5, 2007
- Recorded: August 2006–April 2007
- Studios: Hit Factory Criteria (Miami); El Cartel (Carolina, Puerto Rico); Record Plant (Los Angeles)
- Genres: Hip-hop; reggaeton; Latin pop; R&B
- Length: 77:49
- Languages: Spanish; English
- Labels: El Cartel; Interscope
- Producers: Scott Storch; Akon; Mr. Collipark; Luny Tunes; Humby; will.i.am; Just Blaze; Tainy; Nely; Menes; Echo; Diesel; Diaz Brothers

Daddy Yankee chronology
Barrio Fino en Directo (2005)	El Cartel: The Big Boss (2007)	Talento de Barrio (2008)

Singles from El Cartel: The Big Boss
- 1. "Impacto" Released: April 12, 2007; 2. "Ella Me Levantó" Released: August 8, 2007

El Cartel: The Big Boss is the fourth studio album and eighth overall by Puerto Rican rapper Daddy Yankee. It was released on June 5, 2007, by El Cartel Records through Interscope Records and It is the third installment following El Cartel (1997) and El Cartel II (2001). It explores lyrics and themes ranging from immigration, tabloid rumors, romance, dance and protest against political corruption. The album production persecutes an aggressive sound and was focus on hardcore reggaeton and Latin urban mixed with elements of tropical rhythms, R&B and straight-up hip-hop on a few tracks. The album's theme was to solidified the artist status at the top of Latin music industry and rivals. It features guest appearances Akon, Fergie, Will.i.am, Nicole Scherzinger, Héctor el Father and contains the contributions of producers such as Scott Storch, Luny Tunes, Tainy, and Mr. Collipark.

El Cartel: The Big Boss receive polarized reviews by the critics. While some critics enjoyed the music diversion and praised the production as Yankee's input and charisma as well, others criticized reggaeton's repetitive formula. The album was nominated for Lo Nuestro Award for Urban Album of the Year. Also, it was nominated for Best Latin Urban Album at the 50th Annual Grammy Awards and Best Urban Music Album at the 8th Annual Latin Grammy Awards. Eventually, it won Top Latin Album of the Year and Reggaeton Album of the year at the 2008 Latin Billboard Music Awards. The album was supported by two official singles. The lead single "Impacto" won Lo Nuestro Award for Video of the Year in 2008 and was included at the soundtrack of Grand Theft Auto IV.

El Cartel: The Big Boss was a commercial success. It debut at the top of US Billboard Top Latin Albums and at number nine US Billboard 200, with the highest sales figure for reggaeton album in its first week. It was the best selling Latin album in the United States of 2007, His third consecutive album to do so, following Barrio Fino en Directo in 2006 and Barrio Fino in 2005, that were top sellers in the two previous years. Eventually, it received platinum certification (Latin field) three times by the Recording Industry Association of America (RIAA). Also, it reached the top ten in Mexico, Peru, Ecuador, Venezuela, Dominican Republic, Argentina and Paraguay selling more than one million of copies worldwide. In August 2007, Daddy Yankee embarked on the Big Boss Tour to promote the album, his second arena tour in the United States and his first official world tour.

== Background and production ==
Following the commercial success of Barrio Fino, Yankee signed a distribution deal with Interscope Records and Universal Music Group. According to the artist, They gave him the best deal at the time. The first album released on the new contract was Barrio Fino en Directo (2005), which end it up becoming the best-selling Latin album of 2006 in the United States.

Initial plans of the album, according to Yankee himself in summer of 2005, it would feature much of his vintage reggaeton style and that he's been in talks with P. Diddy, the Neptunes, Lil Jon and one of his childhood idols, Dr. Dre, about getting down on the album. However, none of those plans was materialized. Daddy Yankee said that he wanted people to see his style as an MC and return to his hip-hop roots. He collaborated with producers Scott Storch and will.i.am to combine, as he put it, "the force and our creative minds to create a new sound". Initially, the album was planned to be released in October 2006 and latter was pushed back to February 2007.

Yankee started writing for the album shortly after the last leg of Barrio Fino World Tour ended in June 2006. The recording seasons official started in August 2006, at the Hit Factory In Miami and ended in April 2007 with the recording of the remix of Impacto with Fergie. In an April 12, 2007 press release, the artist stated that the album was finished and that he recorded a total of 26 songs and was in the process of selecting the tracklist.

He also collaborated with Akon on a track called, "Bring It On", a track he considered as a follow-up to his lead single. Another song from the album that is characterized as a "catchy club banger" entitled, "Impacto" was produced by Scott Storch and features The Black Eyed Peas member, Fergie. He also recorded a song with Pussycat Dolls' lead vocalist, Nicole Scherzinger, which he described as a "crazy dancehall, Caribbean song". On the track "Soy Lo Que Soy", Daddy Yankee self-proclaimed himself as the leader of reggaeton when he stated that "the Latin people baptized me as the King of Reggaeton".

In an interview published on September 20, 2007, during the promotional tour, Yankee reflected on the musical direction and intentions of the record. He stated: "I want to make music for everybody, not only for my Latinos. That was the main goal, but also bringing my roots into the music." Furthermore, he explained that he did not wish to replicate the formula of *Barrio Fino*, particularly with commercially successful singles such as *Gasolina* and *Rompe*, noting that "it happened once in a lifetime". He concluded by emphasizing his artistic identity, declaring: "I'm not a product. I'm a creative artist."

== Promotion and media appearances ==
On April 16, 2007, Yankee revealed plans for his second arena tour in the US with initial plans to expand the tour to Europe and Asia. Following the announcement, presale of the tickets started and fans got a pre-order digital copy of the album on iTunes in a marketing strategy to bundle the sales. In May 2007, MTV Tr3s made the reggaeton star its "Artist of the Month", with interviews, news and special programming across its TV, online and wireless platforms. On May 15, 2007, the album was released for pre-order along with the remix of Impacto with Fergie and the iTunes-exclusive bonus track "No Comprende". Also, the dates of the US leg were released and available for presale. On May 30, 2007, Yankee performed on MTV TRL. Those who pre-ordered the album got a special code to buy the tickets on June 9, 2007, while the general sales were set on June 15. The led single Impacto was used on a Pepsi TV advertasing on 14 Latin American countries.

On the day the album was released, an especial edition was released to Walmart that included an exclusive MTV Tr3s-branded package. It includes a DVD with a Daddy Yankee interview, five performances from his MTV $2 Bill concert. Following the album release, Daddy Yankee embarked in a series of press conferences and television appearances to promote the album including El Show de Cristina, Don Francisco Presenta and So You Think You Can Dance. However, on June 8, 2007, he was hospitalized due to dehydration and exhaustion. For this reason, many public appearances were cancelled for rest of the week including several in store appearances, a Puerto Rican parade broadcast on MTV Tres in New York and the Bling Bineo concert at the Shea Stadium.

On August 3, 2007, Yankee performed "Impacto" on The Tonight Show with Jay Leno, one of the few Latin acts to do so at the time. On October 2, 2007, he made a guest appearance on the second episode "The Work of a Business Man" of the TV series Cane where also he performed the track "Who's Your Daddy?". The episode was premiered with a viewership of 9.24 million. On November 8, 2007, he performed "Ella Me Levanto" at the 2007 Latin Grammy Awards ceremony. During the promotion of the album, Daddy Yankee performed at Madison Square Garden. The album was supported by The Big Boss Tour, which started its US leg at the Chicago Allstate Arena on August 31 through October 17, 2007, at the Toyota Center in Houston. Following that, the tour continued in Latin America.

== Reception ==
=== Commercial reception ===
In the United States, first-week sales were initially projected at 110,000–115,000 copies. However, the album debuted at number nine on the Billboard 200 and at number one on the Top Latin Albums chart with 82,000 copies sold in its first week, marking the highest opening week for a reggaeton album at the time. By the end of 2007, El Cartel: The Big Boss had become the best-selling Latin album in the United States, with 248,000 copies sold. It was also the only reggaeton album released in 2007 to appear in the year-end top 10 best-selling Latin albums in the country, despite the significant decline in Latin album sales that year.The album further gave Daddy Yankee the best-selling Latin album in the United States for a third consecutive year, following Barrio Fino in 2005 and Barrio Fino en Directo in 2006. On March 26, 2009, the album received a Latin album triple platinum certification by the Recording Industry Association of America (RIAA) for shipping 300,000 copies.

In Mexico, the album debut at number five and later received platinum certification for moving 50,000 copies. Also, the album was certified Gold. In Venezuela, the album debut at number 4 on the charts. In the Dominican Republic, El Cartel: The Big Boss was reported among the country’s best-selling albums in late 2007, while Daddy Yankee was identified as the leading reggaeton seller in the local market as of September 2007. In Argentina and Ecuador, the album debut at number 4. In Venezuela, it debut and peaked at number 5 at the retail album charts according to Recordland. In Peru, it peaked at number 10 at the retail best selling albums charts. The album also charted in Swerzerland and Spain. In Japan, it debut at number 41 with 4,184 copies sold. As of November 2007, The album sold 800,000 copies worldwide. It hit 900,000 copies in it first 12 months of being released. According to Yankees own label, El Cartel: The Big Boss sold nearly 2 million of copies worldwide as of 2024.

=== Critical reception ===
Professional ratings
Review scores
Source	Rating
AllMusic	4/5 stars
Billboard	(favorable)
Entertainment Weekly	C
Los Angeles Times	3/4 stars
Miami New Times	(Negative)
The New York Times	(favorable)
PopMatters	6/10 stars
Stylus Magazine	C+
The Washington Post	(favorable)

El Cartel: The Big Boss received generally favorable reviews. Most of the critics praised the album's production and Yankee's input, while others criticized some creative decisions and the repetitive formula. AllMusic gave the album a positive review and said the album consists of "potential hits". Rhapsody said, "he once again proves himself the reigning king of reggaeton" and proclaimed that "he's also doing more with hip-hop in the mainland idiom than a lot of artists." While, Jon Pareles from The New York Times praised Yankee's charisma, consistency and ability and stated "Daddy Yankee has grown more earnest. He raps about his street connections, his success, his gratitude to God, his artistic pride and his annoyance with the press". Leisla Cobo form Billboard staff praised the production and mainstream appeal and stated "Above all, this is simply a better-crafted album, at both a songwriting and a production level, than prior efforts".

In a more detailed review, Agustin Gurza from the Los Angeles Times gave the album 3 out 4 stars and wrote a positive review titled "Daddy Yankee knows this best; The rapper, once expected to be a crossover star, mostly stays true to his reggaeton roots". In the review he stated "leaves no doubt that he still has the skill and style that made him stand out from reggaeton's crowded rank-and-file" and about the artist's charisma and talent wrote "leaves no doubt that he still has the skill and style that made him stand out from reggaeton's crowded rank-and-file".

In a more critical review, Andrew Casillas of Stylus Magazine gave a mixed review to the record and compared the album to Daddy Yankee's previous efforts and said, "while the front-loaded standard reggaetón tracks aren't short on hit potential, they're lacking in the sort of charisma that has made Daddy Yankee famous." He then added that "the closing third of the album is quite encouraging. Neil Drumming from Entertainment Weekly, wrote "Here, the steady, dance-floor-quivering rhythms that make reggaeton a club staple are beefed up by hip-hop producers like Scott Storch and will.i.am. The results, nonetheless, are robotic: shrill melodies and beats so rigid and relentless". Ed Morales of Newsday placed the album at number five on his list of the top 10 Latin CDs of 2007.

== Singles ==
"Impacto" was released as the lead single from the album on April 12, 2007. Simultaneously, the remix version, featuring Fergie was released as a second single. The videos of the two version were released in the Universal Studios. "Mensaje De Estado" was released as the first promotional recording off the album; a short music video then followed. The third official single, "Ella Me Levanto" was also released. In October 2007 was released the official video. The video was recorded in the Dominican Republic.

== Track listing ==
No.	Title	Writer(s)	Producer(s)	Length
1.	"Jefe"	Raymond Ayala, Leo Vazquez	Diaz Brothers	3:58
2.	"En Sus Marcas Listos Fuera"	Ayala, Vazquez	Tainy, Menes	3:27
3.	"Cambio"	Ayala	Scott Storch	3:11
4.	"Fuera de Control"	Ayala	Luny Tunes, Tainy	3:03
5.	"Impacto"	Ayala	Scott Storch, Tainy	3:05
6.	"Ella Me Levantó"	Ayala	Mr. G., Nely, Tainy	3:29
7.	"A lo Clásico"	Ayala, Vazquez, Jose Torres	Scott Storch, Nely, Tainy	3:54
8.	"Bring It On" (featuring Akon)	Ayala, Thiam Aliaune, Frederick Tipton	Akon	3:43
9.	"Who's Your Daddy?"	Ayala, William Adams	will.i.am	3:28
10.	"El Celular"	Ayala, Vazquez	Nely	2:48
11.	"Ven Dámelo"	Ayala, Torres, Vazquez	Nely, Tainy	3:45
12.	"Papi Lover" (featuring Nicole Scherzinger)	Ayala, Nicole Scherzinger, Kara DioGuardi	Just Blaze, Echo & Diesel	3:40
13.	"Qué Pasó!"	Ayala, Jason Boyd	Scott Storch	4:11
14.	"Mensaje de Estado"	Ayala	Mr. Collipark, Los Vegaz	4:06
15.	"Tensión" (featuring Héctor el Father)	Ayala, Vazquez, Víctor Rivera	Nely	3:21
16.	"Soy Lo Que Soy"	Ayala, Vazquez	Nely	4:11
17.	"Coraza Divina" (additional voices by Héctor el Father)	Ayala	Egy Rodriguez	3:55
18.	"Plane to PR" (featuring will.i.am)	Ayala, Adams	will.i.am	4:07
19.	"Me Quedaría"	Ayala	Humby	4:20
20.	"Todos Quieren a Raymond"	Ayala	Egy Rodriguez	4:42
21.	"Impacto (Remix)" (featuring Fergie)	Ayala, Adams, Stacy Ferguson	Scott Storch, Tainy	3:26

Itunes Exclusive Bonus Track
No.	Title	Writer(s)	Producer(s)	Length
22.	"No Comprende"	Ayala	Scott Storch	3:33

Wallmart MTV Tr3s DVD Limited Edition
No.	Title	Length
1.	"Gangster Zone (Live)"	2:30
2.	"Interview 1"	3:31
3.	"King Daddy (Live)"	2:38
4.	"Interview 2"	3:37
5.	"Dale Caliente (Live)"	3:18
6.	"Interview 3"	5:41
7.	"Machete (Live)"	3:08
8.	"Interview 4"	5:42
9.	"Gasolina (Live)"	3:17

== Credits and personnel ==
Production

- Executive Producer: Raymond Ayala
- Musical Producer: Daddy Yankee
- Co-Producer: Jose "Gocho" Torres
- Creative Director: Carlos R. Pérez

Interscope Team

- A&R: Joe "3H" Weinberger, HHH Artists
- Marketing: Christian Clancy
- Marketing Director: Andrew Flad
- Marketing Coordinator: Justin Dreyfuss
- Mix Engineer: Dylan "3-D" Dresdow
- Production Coordinator: Les Scurry
- Publicity: Dennis Dennehy
- Video: Randy Sosin/David Saslow
- New Media: Ravid Yosef
- Legal: Damian Elahi
- A&R Coordinator: Archie Schonfeld, HHH Artists
- International: Don Robinson

El Cartel Records

- Project Manager: Mireddys Gonzalez
- Legal & Business Affairs: Edwin Prado
- Manager: Nomar Ayala
- Project Coordinator: Lorna Robles
- Public Relations: Mayna Nevárez
- Tour Manager: Milton Gonzalez
- Stage Manager: Pedro Jimenez

Elastic People Team

- Art Direction/Design: Carlos R. Pérez
- Graphic Design: Kiley del Valle
- Interactive Designer: Balind Sieber
- Project Coordination: Eric Vazquez
- Controller: Joanna Egozcue
- Photography by: Mateo Garcia
- Producer: Alejandro Navia
- Stylist: O'Neal McKnight

== Charts and certifications ==
=== Weekly charts ===
Chart (2007)	Peak position
Argentinian Album Chart	4
Ecuadorian Album Chart	4
Japanese Albums (Oricon)	41
Mexican Albums Chart	5
Mexican International Albums Chart	2
Peruvian Album Chart	10
Spanish Albums Chart	65
Swiss Albums Chart	52
U.S. Billboard 200	9
U.S. Billboard Digital Albums	9
U.S. Billboard Top Latin Albums	1
U.S. Billboard Latin Rhythm Albums	1
U.S. Billboard Top Rap Albums	1

=== Sales and certifications ===
Region	Certification	Certified units/sales
Mexico (AMPROFON)	Gold	50,000^{^}
United States (RIAA)	3× Platinum (Latin)	300,000^{^}
^{^} Shipments figures based on certification alone.

== See also ==
- List of number-one Billboard Top Latin Albums of 2007
- List of number-one Billboard Latin Rhythm Albums of 2007
