= List of Billboard Latin Rhythm Airplay number ones of 2010 =

The Billboard Latin Rhythm Airplay is a chart that ranks the most-played songs on Latin rhythm radio stations. Published by Billboard magazine, the data are compiled by Nielsen SoundScan based collectively on each single's weekly airplay.

== Chart history ==
Key
†	Indicates number 1 on Billboard's year-end Latin rhythm chart

Issue date	Song	Artist(s)	Ref.
January 2	"Hasta Abajo"	Don Omar	
January 9	"Hasta Abajo"	Don Omar	
January 16	"Hasta Abajo"	Don Omar	
January 23	"Hasta Abajo"	Don Omar	
January 30	"Dile al Amor" †	Aventura	
February 6	"Nadie Te Amará Como Yo"	Dyland & Lenny	
February 13	"Nadie Te Amará Como Yo"	Dyland & Lenny	
February 20	"El Doctorado"	Tony Dize	
February 27	"El Doctorado"	Tony Dize	
March 6	"Descontrol"	Daddy Yankee	
March 13	"Descontrol"	Daddy Yankee	
March 20	"Te Pido Perdón"	Tito el Bambino	
March 27	"Te Pido Perdón"	Tito el Bambino	
April 3	"Te Pido Perdón"	Tito el Bambino	
April 10	"Descontrol"	Daddy Yankee	
April 17	"Niña Bonita"	Chino & Nacho	
April 24	"Niña Bonita"	Chino & Nacho	
May 1	"Niña Bonita"	Chino & Nacho	
May 8	"Niña Bonita"	Chino & Nacho	
May 15	"Niña Bonita"	Chino & Nacho	
May 22	"Niña Bonita"	Chino & Nacho	
May 29	"Te Pido Perdón"	Tito el Bambino	
June 5	"Te Pido Perdón"	Tito el Bambino	
June 12	"Te Pido Perdón"	Tito el Bambino	
June 19	"Cuando Me Enamoro"	Enrique Iglesias featuring Juan Luis Guerra	
June 26	"Cuando Me Enamoro"	Enrique Iglesias featuring Juan Luis Guerra	
July 3	"Cuando Me Enamoro"	Enrique Iglesias featuring Juan Luis Guerra	
July 10	"La Vida es Así"	Ivy Queen	
July 17	"Cuando Me Enamoro"	Enrique Iglesias featuring Juan Luis Guerra	
July 24	"Cuando Me Enamoro"	Enrique Iglesias featuring Juan Luis Guerra	
July 31	"Cuando Me Enamoro"	Enrique Iglesias featuring Juan Luis Guerra	
August 7	"Quiere Pa' Que Te Quieran"	Dyland & Lenny	
August 14	"Cuando Me Enamoro"	Enrique Iglesias featuring Juan Luis Guerra	
August 21	"La Vida es Así"	Ivy Queen	
August 28	"La Vida es Así"	Ivy Queen	
September 4	"La Despedida"	Daddy Yankee	
September 11	"La Despedida"	Daddy Yankee	
September 18	"La Despedida"	Daddy Yankee	
September 25	"La Despedida"	Daddy Yankee	
October 2	"La Despedida"	Daddy Yankee	
October 9	"La Despedida"	Daddy Yankee	
October 16	"I Like It"	Enrique Iglesias featuring Pitbull	
October 23	"I Like It"	Enrique Iglesias featuring Pitbull	
October 30	"La Despedida"	Daddy Yankee	
November 6	"La Despedida"	Daddy Yankee	
November 13	"Danza Kuduro"	Don Omar and Lucenzo	
November 20	"Danza Kuduro"	Don Omar and Lucenzo	
November 27	"Danza Kuduro"	Don Omar and Lucenzo	
December 4	"Danza Kuduro"	Don Omar and Lucenzo	
December 11	"Danza Kuduro"	Don Omar and Lucenzo	
December 18	"Danza Kuduro"	Don Omar and Lucenzo	
December 25	"Danza Kuduro"	Don Omar and Lucenzo	
