= El Imperio Nazza =

Compilation albums distributed by El Cartel Records

El Imperio Nazza is a series of compilations by popular reggaeton producers Musicólogo & Menes "Los de la Nazza", distributed by El Cartel Records.

== El Imperio Nazza (2012) ==
El Imperio Nazza

Mixtape by Musicólogo & Menes
- Released: January 28, 2012
- Recorded: 2011–2012
- Genre: Reggaeton
- Length: 59:20
- Labels: El Cartel Records; Nazza Records
- Producers: Musicologo & Menes (exec.); Benny Benni; Omi Corchea; Perreke; DJ Nelson; ALX; Bryan "La Mente Del Equipo"; Los Hitmen; A&X; Naldo

The very first volume in the series was released on January 28, 2012. A mixtape including collaborations by artists such as Daddy Yankee, Arcángel, Don Omar & Randy.

#	Title	Performer(s)	Producer(s)	Length
1	Intro	Musicólogo & Menes	Musicologo & Menes	0:48
2	Guaya	Daddy Yankee Ft. Arcángel	Musicologo & Menes	3:13
3	La Rosa Negra	Carnal	Musicologo & Menes, Benny Benni	3:32
4	La Roquerita	Genio & Baby Johnny	Musicologo & Menes, Omi Corchea	3:54
5	Ganas	Farruko	Musicologo & Menes	3:23
6	No Te Voy A Mentir	Lui-G 21+	Musicologo & Menes, Perreke & NelFlow	3:12
7	Llegale	Daddy Yankee Ft. Gotay El Autentiko	Musicologo & Menes	3:38
8	Me Descontrolo	Jadiel	Musicologo & Menes, ALX	4:08
9	Chikilla Loka	Galante Ft. Randy	Musicologo & Menes, ALX & Bryan La Mente Del Equipo, Lelo & Jazz Los Hitmens	4:28
10	Taboo (Remix)	Don Omar Ft. Daddy Yankee	Musicologo & Menes, A&X	4:24
11	Te Sigo Buscando	J Álvarez Ft. Carnal	Musicologo & Menes, Benny Benni	3:57
12	Una Chica Como Tu	Delirious Ft. Endo & Benny Benni	Musicologo & Menes, Benny Benni	4:10
13	Bellaqueo & Alcohol	Juno	Musicologo & Menes	3:18
14	Soldados	Daddy Yankee Ft. Barrington Levy & Ñengo Flow	Musicologo & Menes	3:18
15	El Amor Vencio	Yaga & Mackie	Musicologo & Menes, Naldo	3:16
16	Ready Pal Duelo	Kario & Yaret	Musicologo & Menes, Jose Javy Ferrer	3:32
17	Bien Loco	Juno Ft. Carnal	Musicologo & Menes, Benny Benni	3:18

== El Imperio Nazza: Gold Edition (2012) ==
El Imperio Nazza: Gold Edition

Mixtape by Musicólogo & Menes
- Released: June 2, 2012
- Recorded: 2012
- Genre: Reggaeton
- Length: 1:02:09
- Labels: El Cartel Records; Nazza Records
- Producers: Musicologo & Menes (exec.); Benny Benni; ALX (Galante); DJ Luian "El Ravo De Oro"; Nerol; Omi Corchea; Bryan "La Mente Del Equipo"; Live Music (DJ Giann, Dexter & Mr. Greenz); Delirious

The second volume in the series was released on June 2, 2012.

#	Title	Performer(s)	Producer(s)	Length
1	La Dupleta	Daddy Yankee Ft. Arcángel	Musicologo & Menes, Dj Luian	3:15
2	Comienza El Bellaqueo	Daddy Yankee	Musicologo & Menes	2:39
3	Dámelo	Tito El Bambino	Musicologo & Nerol	2:26
4	Yo Estoy Pa Ti	Gotay	Musicologo & Menes, Benny Benni	3:43
5	Ahora Te Vas	Jadiel	Musicologo & Menes	3:40
6	Xplosión	J Álvarez Ft. Daddy Yankee & Farruko	Musicologo & Menes, Benny Benni	3:49
7	Chuleria	J-King & Maximan	Musicologo & Menes	3:39
8	Ella Es Mi Mujer	Benny Benni Ft. Farruko	Musicologo & Menes, Benny Benni	3:15
9	Que Es La Que Hay	Genio & Baby Johnny	Musicologo & Menes, Omi Corchea	3:19
10	Ponte Puty	Galante Ft. Franco "El Gorila"	Musicologo & Menes, ALX (Galante), Bryan "La Mente Del Equipo" & Live Music (DJ Giann, Dexter & Mr. Greenz)	2:54
11	Algo Entre Tu y Yo	Delirious Ft. Farruko	Musicologo & Menes, Benny Benni	3:52
12	Piensas En Mi	Kario & Yaret	Musicologo & Menes, Jose Javy Ferrer	2:59
13	La Disco Se Encendió	Pacho & Cirilo	Musicologo & Menes, DJ Luian, Valdo "La Eminéncia", DJ Uly & Hancel	3:18
14	Te Amo Tanto	Juno Ft. Delirious	Musicologo & Menes	3:35
15	Bomboncito	Chyno Nyno	Musicologo & Menes, Benny Benni	3:14
16	La Idea	Reykon	Musicologo & Menes	3:20
17	Si Supieras	J Álvarez	Musicologo & Menes	3:42
18	Amor De Lejos	Farruko	Musicologo & Menes, ALX (Galante) & Benny Benni	2:39
19	Plo Plo Plo (Remix)	Benny Benni Ft. Endo & Chyno Nyno	Musicologo & Menes, Benny Benni	3:01

The remixes version's

#	Title	Performer(s)	Producer(s)	Length
1	Chuleria (Remix)	J-King & Maximan Ft. Zion, Jory Boy, Yomo & Tony Lenta	Los De La Nazza & Dj Luian	5:06
2	Ponte Puty (2Ble Puty)	Galante Ft. Franco El Gorila, Guelo Star, Gotay, Luigi 21 Plus, Alexis & Antony Yetsons	Los De La Nazza, Galante ALX, DJ Luian & Bryan	6:32
3	Piensas En Mi (Remix)	Kario & Yaret Ft. Nicky Jam	Los De La Nazza	3:35
4	La Disco Se Encendio (Remix)	Pacho & Cirilo Ft. Ñengo Flow, Farruko, Gotay, D.OZi, J Álvarez, MB Alqaeda, Jory & Franco El Gorila	Los De La Nazza & DJ Luian	7:44

== Imperio Nazza: Gotay Edition (2012) ==
Imperio Nazza: Gotay Edition

Mixtape by Gotay + Musicólogo & Menes
- Released: September 1, 2012
- Recorded: 2012
- Genre: Reggaeton
- Length: 31:26
- Labels: El Cartel Records; Nazza Records
- Producers: Musicologo & Menes (exec.); Benny Benni

The third volume in the series was released on September 1, 2012. Unlike the first two mixtapes in the series, this mixtape starred only one artist: Gotay.

#	Title	Featuring	Producer(s)	Length
1	Hasta Otro Mundo		Musicologo & Menes, Benny Benni	3:03
2	Si Supieras		Musicologo & Menes, Benny Benni	3:44
3	Pa Eso Estoy Yo	Daddy Yankee	Musicologo & Menes, Benny Benni	4:06
4	Esto Se Jodió		Musicologo & Menes, Benny Benni	2:56
5	Dile		Musicologo & Menes, Benny Benni	4:03
6	Esperandote	J Álvarez	Musicologo & Menes, Benny Benni	3:25
7	Tengo Un Plan B		Musicologo & Menes, Benny Benni	3:12
8	Otra Noche		Musicologo & Menes, Benny Benni	3:23
9	Ya Nada Es Asi	Jory	Musicologo & Menes	3:38

== Imperio Nazza: J. Alvarez Edition (2012) ==
Imperio Nazza: J. Alvarez Edition (2012)

Mixtape by J Álvarez + Musicólogo & Menes
- Released: December 15, 2012
- Recorded: 2012
- Genre: Reggaeton
- Length: 28:50
- Labels: El Cartel Records; Nazza Records; Flow Music
- Producers: Musicologo & Menes (exec.); Luny Tunes; Predikador; Benny Benni; DJ Nelson; Perreke; Montana "The Producer"

The fourth volume in the series was released on December 15, 2012. It was based around on reggaeton artist J Álvarez. This album was nominated for an Urban Album of the Year at the 26th Lo Nuestro Awards.

#	Title	Featuring	Producer(s)	Length
1	No Me Hagas Esperar		Musicologo & Menes, Luny Tunes	3:02
2	Nos Matamos Bailando	Daddy Yankee	Musicologo & Menes, Luny Tunes	2:54
3	Me Tienes Loco	Jory	Musicologo & Menes	3:27
4	La Disco La LLama		Musicologo & Menes, Benny Benni, DJ Nelson & Perreke	2:46
5	Esto Es Reggaeton	Farruko	Musicologo & Menes, Benny Benni	3:09
6	Una Noche Más	Franco "El Gorila"	Musicologo & Menes, Luny Tunes	3:14
7	El Business		Musicologo & Menes, Benny Benni	2:58
8	Se Acabó El Amor		Musicologo & Menes, Predikador	3:35
9	Actúa (Remix)	De La Ghetto & Zion	Musicologo & Menes, Montana "The Producer"	3:51

The Remixes Version's

#	Title	Featuring	Producer(s)	Length
1	El Business (Remix)	Alexis & Fido	Musicologo & Menes	3:31
2	Se Acabo El Amor (Remix)	Divino	Musicologo & Menes, Predikador	3:43
3	Se Acabo El Amor (Panama Remix)	Eddy Lover	Musicologo & Menes, Predikador	3:45
4	Se Acabo El Amor (Dominicano Remix)	Vakero	Musicologo & Menes, Predikador	3:42
5	Se Acabo El Amor (Colombia Remix)	Yelsid	Musicologo & Menes, Predikador, Montana The Producer	3:58

== Imperio Nazza: Doxis Edition (2013) ==
Imperio Nazza: Doxis Edition (2013)

Mixtape by Jowell & Randy + Musicólogo & Menes
- Released: January 26, 2013
- Recorded: 2012
- Genre: Reggaeton
- Length: 35:16
- Labels: El Cartel Records; Nazza Records; Live Music
- Producers: Musicologo & Menes (exec.); Live Music; DJ Urba & Rome

The fifth volume of the series was released on January 26, 2013. It features the reggaeton duo Jowell & Randy.

#	Title	Featuring	Producers	Length
1	Mucha Soltura	Daddy Yankee	Musicologo & Menes, DJ Blass	3:56
2	Chulo Sin H	De La Ghetto	Musicologo & Menes	4:47
3	Bellaco Con Bellaca	Ñengo Flow	Musicologo & Menes, DJ Giann	3:54
4	"Loco & Bien Suelto"		Musicologo & Menes	2:49
5	Adicta Al Perreo	Lui-G 21+ & Polakan	Musicólogo & Menes, DJ Blass, DJ Giann	5:15
6	El Bibi	Reykon	Musicologo & Menes	3:38
7	A Mi Modo	Angel & Khriz	Musicologo & Menes, DJ Urba & Rome	3:24
8	Infieles	Tony Lenta	Musicologo & Menes, Jazz The Hitmen, Mr. Greenz	3:19
9	Lo Bueno Se Tarda	J Álvarez, Ñengo Flow, Jory	Musicologo & Menes, Jazz The Hitmen, Mr. Greenz, Marioso	4:07

== Imperio Nazza: Farruko Edition (2013) ==
Imperio Nazza: Farruko Edition (2013)

Mixtape by Farruko + Musicólogo & Menes
- Released: May 24, 2013
- Recorded: 2013
- Genre: Reggaeton
- Length: 45:24
- Labels: El Cartel Records; Nazza Records; Carbon Fiber Music
- Producers: Musicologo & Menes (exec.); Farruko (exec.); DJ Luian; Sharo Torres; Benny Benni

The sixth volume of the series was released on May 26, 2013. It features the reggaeton artist Farruko.

#	Title	Featuring	Producers	Length
1	Voy A 100		Musicologo & Menes, Benny Benni	3:18
2	Booty Booty	Ñengo Flow, Zion & Lennox, Yomo & D.Ozi	Musicologo & Menes, Benny Benni	5:58
3	Besas Tan Bien		Musicologo & Menes, Benny Benni	3:04
4	Mi Vida No Va A Cambiar	Arcángel	Musicologo & Menes, DJ Luian Benny Benni	3:34
5	Forever Alone		Musicologo & Menes, Benny Benni	3:15
6	No Es Una Gial	De La Ghetto	Musicologo & Menes, Benny Benni, DJ Luian	3:44
7	Una Nena	Daddy Yankee	Musicologo & Menes	3:06
8	Hacerte El Amor	J Álvarez	Musicologo & Menes, Benny Benni	3:12
9	Rapapam	Reykon	Musicologo & Menes, Benny Benni	3:29
10	Excusas	Dayane	Musicologo & Menes, Benny Benni	3:27
11	Tiempos		Musicologo & Menes, Benny Benni	3:14
12	Humilde De Corazón		Musicologo & Menes, Sharo Torres, Benny Benni	5:58

The Remixes Version's

#	Title	Featuring	Producers	Length
1	Voy A 100 (Remix)	D.Ozi & Divino	Musicologo & Menes	4:26
2	Besas Tan Bien (Mambo Versión)	Omega El Fuerte	Musicologo & Menes, DJ Luian	3:37
3	Tiempos (Remix)	Yomo & Polaco	Musicologo & Menes, Benny Benni, Notty, DJ Cripy, AG La Voz & Hi-Flow	4:41

== Imperio Nazza: King Daddy Edition (2013) ==
Imperio Nazza: King Daddy Edition (2013)

Mixtape by Daddy Yankee + Musicólogo & Menes
- Released: October 29, 2013
- Recorded: 2013
- Genre: Reggaeton
- Label: El Cartel Records
- Producers: Musicólogo & Menes; Daddy Yankee; Benny Benni

Daddy Yankee chronology
Prestige (2012)	Imperio Nazza: King Daddy Edition (2013) (2013)	Legendaddy (2022)

The seventh volume of the series was released on October 29, 2013. It features the reggaeton artist Daddy Yankee. At the Latin Grammy Awards of 2014, the album received a nomination for Urban Music Album. This volume received a nomination for a Lo Nuestro Award for Urban Album of the Year. King Daddy could not be considered as part of the Imperio Nazza series, because it is sold only as "King Daddy". "La Rompe Carros" music video, the producers Musicólogo & Menes made an appearance at the end of the video.

#	Title	Featuring	Producers	Length
1	Nada Ha Cambiao'	Divino	Musicologo & Menes	3:10
2	Mil Problemas		Musicólogo & Menes	2:34
3	Calentón	Yandel	Musicologo & Menes	3:03
4	La Nueva Y La Ex		Musicologo & Menes	3:17
5	Dónde Es El Party	Farruko	Musicologo & Menes, Benny Benni	3:34
6	La Rompe Carros		Musicologo & Menes	2:59
7	Millonarios	Arcángel	Musicologo & Menes, DJ Luian	3:57
8	Suena Boom		Musicólogo & Menes, Benny Benni	3:09
9	Una Respuesta	J Álvarez	Musicologo & Menes	3:24
10	Déjala Caer		Musicologo & Menes	3:12
11	I'm The Boss		Musicologo & Menes	3:37

== Imperio Nazza: Top Secret (2014) ==
Imperio Nazza: Top Secret Edition (2014)

Mixtape by Musicólogo & Menes
- Released: March 3, 2014
- Recorded: 2011–2014
- Genre: Reggaeton
- Length: 1:16:02
- Labels: El Cartel Records; Nazza Records
- Producers: Musicologo & Menes (exec.); Benny Benni; Freddy & Phantom "Neo Nazza"; Hi-Flow; JX; Segui "El Cirujano"; Gerry Nazza; Jan Paul; Edu "The Music Prodigy"; Super Yei

The eighth volume of the series was released on August 15, 2014. It features new tracks and highly anticipated tracks that were announced in the last three years but were never released.

#	Title	Performer(s)	Producers	Length
1	Una Escapaita	J-King & Maximan	Musicólogo & Menes, Hi-Flow	3:46
2	Igual Que Ayer	Daddy Yankee Ft. Wida López	Musicologo & Menes	3:04
3	Que Tú Me Dices	Chyno Nyno	Musicologo & Menes, Neo Nazza	3:03
4	Dime Que Paso	Daddy Yankee Ft. Arcángel	Musicologo & Menes	3:31
5	Busca La Botella	Tony Tun Tun Ft. Endo	Musicologo & Menes, Neo Nazza	2:52
6	Sin Miedo	Divino Ft. Polakan	Musicólogo & Menes, Benny Benni	3:29
7	Vamos Hacerlo	Gotay	Musicologo & Menes, Benny Benni	3:22
8	Mi Nena	Kenai	Musicologo & Menes, JX	3:16
9	Suena La Alarma	Daddy Yankee Ft. Farruko	Musicologo & Menes	2:01
10	Igual Que Yo	Kelmitt	Musicologo & Menes, Neo Nazza & Edup	3:57
11	El Combo Me Llama	Benny Benni Ft. Pusho	Musicologo & Menes, Segui "El Cirujano"	3:50
12	Súbelo	Farruko	Musicologo & Menes	2:58
13	Tiemblo	Lenny	Musicologo & Menes	3:17
14	Dime Bebé	Ozuna Ft. Gotay	Musicologo & Menes, Los Natty Boyz & Jan Paul	3:56
15	Party Bus	J Álvarez	Musicologo & Menes, Neo Nazza	3:12
16	En Secreto	Eloy	Musicologo & Menes, Neo Nazza, Edup	3:38
17	Mil Maneras	Pinto	Musicologo & Menes, Neo Nazza & Nekxum	3:29
18	Lo Que La Calle Pide	Farruko	Los De La Nazza & Benny Benni	3:00
19	Pásalo	Valdo	Musicologo, Neo Nazza, Benny Benni & Segui "El Cirujano"	3:27
20	Fuego	Killatonez	Musicologo & Menes, Neo Nazza & Super Yei	3:12
21	Solo Una Foto	Carnal	Musicologo & Menes, Benny Benni	3:24
22	Detrás De Ti	Farruko Ft. Jory	Musicologo & Menes	2:42
23	Boom Boom Boom	Delirious Ft. Endo & Benny Benni	Musicologo & Menes, Benny Benni	3:48

The remixes version's

#	Title	Performer(s)	Producer(s)	Length
1	El Combo me Llama (Remix)	Benny Benni Ft. Pusho, Daddy Yankee, Cosculluela, Farruko, D.OZi & El Sica	Los De La Nazza & Segui "El Cirujano"	7:54
2	Igual que Yo (Remix)	Kelmitt Ft. Farruko	Los De La Nazza	4:00

== Orion (2015) ==
Orion (2015)

Studio album by Musicólogo & Menes
- Released: August 11, 2015
- Recorded: 2014–2015
- Genre: Reggaeton
- Labels: Nazza Records & RIMAS
- Producers: Musicólogo & Menes (exec.); Neo Nazza; Super Yei; Hi Flow; Jowny Boom Boom; Gerry Nazza

Orion is the ninth volume from "Los De La Nazza", it was released as a two part album. The first part of the album is named "Orion: Ride of the Universe" and the second part is named "Orion: The Lost Constellation". Both were scheduled to be released on August 28, 2015. However, they were leaked on to the internet August 10, forcing Musicólogo & Menes to release them earlier than expected. The first part's musical style is based on theme park songs, often with spooky melodies. The music video for the song "Tumba La Casa", performed by Alexio "La Bestia", was released on March 26, 2015. It was the first music video for this album.

=== Orion: Ride of The Universe ===
#	Title	Performer(s)	Producers	Length
1	Welcome to Orion	Musicólogo & Menes	Musicólogo & Menes	1:49
2	Tumba La Casa	Alexio "La Bestia"	Musicólogo & Menes, Jowny Boom Boom	4:02
3	Voy Por Ahí	Lui-G 21 Plus	Musicólogo & Menes, Montana The Producer	3:35
4	Abracadabra	Kendo Kaponi	Musicólogo & Menes, NeoNazza, Super Yei	3:40
5	En Alta	Pusho	Musicólogo & Menes	3:43
6	Perreo Sólido	Jowell & Randy	Musicólogo, DJ Blass & Jazz The Hitmen	3:29
7	Si El Mundo Se Acabara	J Quiles	Musicólogo & Menes	3:46
8	Quiere Calle	Farruko	Musicólogo & Menes	3:48
9	Acurrucao	Chyno Nyno	Musicólogo & Menes	3:12
10	Juanka En Orion	Juanka "El Problematik"	Musicólogo & Menes, Super Yei	4:24
11	Party En Orion	Khriz & Angel	Musicólogo & Menes	3:31
12	Ride of The Universe	Musicólogo & Menes	Musicólogo & Menes	1:55

The remixes version's

#	Title	Performer(s)	Producer(s)	Length
1	Tumba La Casa (Remix)	Alexio "La Béstia" Ft. Arcángel, De La Ghetto, Nicky Jam, Zion, Daddy Yankee, Farruko, Ñengo Flow	Musicólogo & Menes, Jowny Boom Boom & Dj Luian	7:58
2	Si El Mundo Se Acabara (Remix)	J Quiles Ft. Kevin Roldán	Musicólogo & Menes, Dayme, El High	3:59

=== Orion: The Lost Constellation ===
This part of the album has more of a traditional reggaetón feel to it. The music video for the song "Lonely", performed by Farruko, was released on May 18, 2015 on Telemundo's Al Rojo Vivo and you can watch It on YouTube. This is also the second music video from this album.

#	Title	Performer(s)	Producers	Length
1	Quiero Tenerte Aquí	Zion & Lennox	Musicólogo & Menes, Neo Nazza	4:17
2	Noche Fría	Kendo Kaponi Feat. Yomo	Musicólogo & Menes, Super Yei Hi Flow, Neo Nazza	5:10
3	Imagínate	Tony Dize	Musicólogo & Menes, Bryan La Mente del Equipo	4:04
4	Ésta Noche	Ronald "El Killa" Feat. Jory Boy	Musicólogo & Menes	3:42
5	Espejo	Ozuna Feat. De La Ghetto	Musicólogo & Menes	4:19
6	Suena El Boom	Falsetto & Sammy	Musicólogo & Menes, Neo Nazza & Super Yei	3:28
7	Cae La Noche	Ñengo Flow	Musicólogo & Menes, Yampi. Sinfonico & Onyx,	3:46
8	Su Corazón Le Robo	Limitz	Musicólogo & Menes, Neo Nazza	3:49
9	No Sé Qué Tienes	Kelmitt	Musicólogo & Menes, Neo Nazza & EQ El Equalizer	3:37
10	Falsas Mentiras	Ozuna	Musicólogo & Menes, Super Yei	4:30
11	Lonely	Farruko	Musicólogo & Menes, Phantom	3:01
12	Quiero Estar Contigo	Nicky Jam	Musicólogo & Menes	3:16
13	Infiel	Kent & Tony	Musicólogo & Menes, Neo Nazza	3:39
14	Cuéntame Tu Historia	J Álvarez	Musicólogo & Menes, Neo Nazza, Miky Tones & JX	3:06

== Imperio Nazza: Justin Quiles Edition (2016) ==
Imperio Nazza: Justin Quiles Edition (2016)

Mixtape by Justin Quiles + Musicólogo & Menes
- Released: January 22, 2016
- Recorded: 2015–2016
- Genre: Reggaeton
- Length: 31:57
- Labels: Nazza Records; Rich Music
- Producers: Musicólogo & Menes (exec.); Freddy & Phantom "Súbelo Neo"; Nenus "El Ingeniero"

The tenth volume of the series was released on January 22, 2016. It features the reggaeton artist Justin Quiles.

#	Title	Featuring	Producers	Length
1	Un Rato		Musicólogo & Menes, Súbelo Neo , Nenus	3:32
2	El Party Se Formó		Musicólogo & Menes, Súbelo Neo , Nenus	3:24
3	Ocean Park		Musicólogo & Menes, Súbelo Neo , Nenus	3:33
4	Cuando Salgo	Darkiel	Musicólogo & Menes, Súbelo Neo , Nenus	3:35
5	Hombre Cómo Yo		Musicólogo & Menes, Súbelo Neo , Nenus	3:34
6	Gladiadora		Musicólogo & Menes, Súbelo Neo , Nenus	3:06
7	Honestamente		Musicólogo & Menes, Nenus	3:39
8	Vacaciones Por Tu Cuerpo		Musicólogo & Menes, Súbelo Neo , Nenus	3:56
9	Si El Mundo Se Acabara		Musicólogo & Menes	3:46

#	Title	Performer(s)	Producer(s)	Length
1	Si El Mundo Se Acabara (Remix)	Justin Quiles Ft. Kevin Roldán	Musicólogo & Menes, Dayme, El High	3:59

== Imperio Nazza: Kendo Edition (2016) ==
Imperio Nazza: Kendo Edition (2016)

Mixtape by Kendo Kaponi + Musicólogo & Menes
- Released: December 30, 2016
- Recorded: 2015–2016
- Genre: Reggaeton
- Label: Nazza Records
- Producers: Musicólogo & Menes (exec.); Super Yei; Jone Quest

The eleventh and final volume of the series was released on December 30, 2016. It features the reggaeton artist Kendo Kaponi.

#	Title	Featuring	Producers	Length
1	Que Se Muevan		Super Yei & Jone Quest, Musicologo & Menes	3:55
2	Con Quien Estas		Super Yei & Jone Quest	3:30
3	No Te Enamores	Ñejo	Super Yei, Jone Quest, Musicologo & Menes	4:16
4	Tendre Que Olvidarme		Super Yei & Jone Quest	4:01
5	Pa Alla & Pa Aca	Farruko	Super Yei & Jone Quest, Musicólogo & Menes	4:05
6	La Llave De Mi Corazón		Super Yei & Jone Quest	3:52
7	Criminal	Cosculluela	Musicologo & Menes, Neonazza, Super Yei, Jone Quest & Mueka	3:33
8	Te Ando Buscando		Super Yei & Jone Quest	3:09
9	El Dinero No Lo Es Todo	Ozuna	Super Yei & Jone Quest	4:58
10	Suicidio		Musicologo & Menes, Neo Nazza	4:47
