= Grito Mundial =

2009 single by Daddy Yankee

Single by Daddy Yankee

from the album Mundial
- Released: October 08, 2009 (Airplay); October 20, 2009 (Digital)
- Recorded: 2009
- Genre: Worldbeat; Latin pop; samba
- Length: 3:04
- Label: El Cartel Records, Sony Music
- Songwriter: R. Ayala
- Producer: Musicólogo & Menes

Daddy Yankee singles chronology
"El Ritmo No Perdona (Prende)" (2009)	"Grito Mundial" (2009)	"Descontrol" (2010)

Grito Mundial (English: Worldwide Scream) is the lead single from Daddy Yankee's studio album Mundial released on October 8, 2009.

- Musicians: Trumpet and Trombone recorded by Juan Quinones
- Music Production: Musicologo & Nemes

== Background ==
Before to "Grito Mundial", "El Ritmo No Perdona (Prende)" was released, back later he explained that was just to give the fans a little taste of his new album Daddy Yankee Mundial. The song was produced by El Musicólogo and Menes "Los de la Nasa", and was released on October 8, 2009 Airplay and digitally October 20, 2009.

The song has been compared with fellow Puerto Rican artist Ricky Martin's worldwide hit "La Copa de la Vida", and Yankee it said he would like that the song to be used for the 2010 FIFA World Cup, as use "La Copa de la Vida" on the 1998 FIFA World Cup, Shakira's song "Waka Waka", was chosen instead.

== Controversy ==
In a 2010 Facebook video, former collaborator Eddie Ávila (previously known as Eddie Dee) was asked about his relation with Daddy Yankee. He stated that, following creative differences between both that started in 2005 (with 2007 being the last time both communicated), he released a single in 2009 for his ultimately unreleased mixtape 180 Grados, entitled "Eso No Va Conmigo". Though not a diss track, Ávila has confirmed to have dissed Yankee in certain lines. This was because Ávila had been announcing his single when Yankee released "Grito Mundial" on the same date as Ávila's single, effectively overshadowing the latter. Angered and denying it to be a coincidence, Ávila changed some lines in his single in order to be directed towards Yankee. He considers this event as the motive, as he originally didn't reference his former ally.

== Music videos ==
Yankee in the music video for "Grito Mundial".

=== Promotional version ===
The same day of song premiere, he released the song in his internet page with a video. It is not the official music video of Grito Mundial. But it is a video released with the song for the time being.

=== Official version ===
The official music video was filmed in late October, 2009 at La Bombonera in Argentina, when Boca Juniors and Chacarita were playing. Halftime was lengthened to complete the filming. The team consisted of about 150 members that joined efforts between Puerto Rico, United States, Argentina and Brazil, where he performed the second part of the filming of "Grito Mundial" in the Tavares Bastos favela. It was directed by Carlos Pérez and Elastic People. It was premiered on January 20, 2010.

== Charts ==
Chart (2009–2010)	Peak position
Chilean Aiplay (Los 40)	9
Mexican Pop Airplay (Billboard)	33
U.S. Billboard Hot Latin Songs	24
U.S. Billboard Latin Rhythm Songs	7
U.S. Billboard Tropical Songs	7
U.S. Billboard Latin Pop Songs	25
Venezuela Top 100 (Record Report)	1
Venezuela Top Latino (Record Report)	1
