= Jadiel =

Puerto Rican reggaeton singer

- Also known as: El Tsunami, El Leon Del Área Sur, El Incomparable
- Born: Ramón Alberto González Adams; December 22, 1985; Ponce, Puerto Rico
- Died: May 10, 2014 (aged 28) Rochester, New York
- Genres: Reggaeton
- Occupation: Singer
- Years active: 2006–2014
- Label: Dembow Music Inc.

Ramón Alberto González Adams (December 22, 1985 – May 10, 2014), better known by his stage name Jadiel, was a Puerto Rican reggaeton singer. In May 2014, he was killed in a motorcycle accident in Rochester, New York.

== Early life ==
Ramón Alberto González Adams was born in Ponce, Puerto Rico on December 22, 1985. At an early age, he began to show an interest in music and began to compose his songs at the age of 8. As he grew up, he began to get better at creating his songs and at the age of 18 he started his reggaeton career. He always liked to experiment with the different types of melodies and tried to make all his songs special and unique. He had a positive influence in the reggaeton industry.

== Musical career ==
He started his musical career with the music company Denbow Music Inc. Throughout his career he has worked with several notable reggaeton artist including, Arcángel, Farruko, Tito "El Bambino", Franco "El Gorilla", and many more.

On September 2, 2008, Jadiel's first studio album, Lo Mejor De Mi, was released. It includes his hit songs including, "Pretty Girl", "Para Que Volver (feat. Arcángel)", "Alárgame La Vida" and many more.

In 2009, he was featured in the popular song "La Nena Del Caserio" which included, Wibal & Alex, Kendo Kaponi, Ñengo Flow, Farruko, Chyno Nyno, Joan & O'Neill, J Alvarez, and Jory Boy.

Throughout 2011 to 2014, he started gaining more success when he released several songs and collaborating with multiple artists. During that period he released the songs "La Cucaracha", "Amor Para Ti", "La Vas a Pagar Caro", and "El Hombre de tu vida".

Some of his last work was with Los De La Nazza, a popular Puerto Rican production duo. He released "Tristeza Interna" and "Me Descontrolo" with them.

== Death ==
On May 10, 2014, Jadiel was in Rochester, New York, riding on a new motorcycle purchased by his brother, who was traveling alongside him on another motorcycle. They were traveling east on Route 104 across from Maplewood Park, when Jadiel lost control of his motorcycle and accidentally crossed the median that separated both sides of the freeway. He was pronounced dead in Strong Memorial Hospital at around 5:00 p.m. He was buried at Cementerio Civil de Ponce.

== Legacy ==
His death was mourned by the reggaeton community in Puerto Rico. Several reggaeton artists came together and made a 22-minute song in his honor called "Jadiel Forever". The song features several known artists including Nicky Jam, Zion & Lennox, and Farruko. His first posthumous album Tsunami Is Back was released on February 14, 2017, three years after his death. It includes several unreleased songs.

== Discography ==
=== Studio albums ===
- 2008: Lo Mejor De Mi

=== Mixtapes ===
- 2017: Tsunami Is Back
