= Descontrol =

2010 single by Daddy Yankee

Single by Daddy Yankee

from the album Mundial
- Released: January 12, 2010 (Airplay); February 23, 2010 (Digital)
- Recorded: 2009–2010
- Genre: Reggaeton
- Length: 2:54
- Label: El Cartel, Sony Music
- Songwriter: Daddy Yankee
- Producer: Musicólogo & Menes

Daddy Yankee singles chronology
"Grito Mundial" (2010)	"Descontrol" (2010)	"La Despedida" (2010)

"Descontrol" (English: Out Of Control) is the second single from Daddy Yankee's album Mundial (2010). The single was released to radio on January 12, 2010, and digitally on February 23, 2010. The song is considered as the most successful single from the album, topping on the Latin Rhythm Songs and charting at number 16 on the Hot Latin Songs.

== Music video ==
=== Promotional video ===
The same day of the song's premiere, Daddy Yankee released the song on his internet page with a video. It is not the official music video, but it is a video released with the song for the time being.

=== Official video ===
The music video was filmed when Yankee went to New York City for three days, taking advantage to make the video for the song. A preview of the video was released on April 21, 2010. The music video was then released on May 17, 2010, in 3-D on his official website.

== Charts ==
=== Weekly charts ===
Chart (2010)	Peak position
Chilean Airplay (Los 40)	3
US Hot Latin Songs (Billboard)	16
US Latin Pop Airplay (Billboard)	33
US Latin Rhythm Airplay (Billboard)	1

=== Year-end charts ===
Chart (2010)	Position
US Hot Latin Songs (Billboard)	47

== See also ==
- List of Billboard Latin Rhythm Airplay number ones of 2010
