= Ella Me Levantó =

2007 song performed by Daddy Yankee

Single by Daddy Yankee

from the album El Cartel: The Big Boss
- Released: August 8, 2007
- Recorded: 2006–2007
- Genre: Reggaeton; merengue
- Length: 3:29
- Label: Interscope; El Cartel
- Songwriter: Ramón Ayala
- Producers: Elvis "Mr. G" Garcia; Nely "El Arma Secreta"; Tainy; DJ Nunny

Daddy Yankee singles chronology
"Impacto" (2007)	"Ella Me Levantó" (2007)	"Pose" (2008)

"Ella Me Levantó" (English: "She Picked Me Up"), is a 2007 reggaeton single by Daddy Yankee. Known for its combination of the "reggaeton" and "merengue" genres, the song helps define the new subgenre of reggaeton and merengue, "merenguetón".

It was released after "Mensaje de Estado," and Yankee also performed the song at the Latin Grammy Awards in December 2007.

In the U.S., the song peaked at number two on the Hot Latin Tracks chart.

== Music video ==
The music video for "Ella Me Levantó" features Ayala in what appears to be a restaurant-club type setting. The video begins with people playing billiards, suddenly when Yankee starts performing the song. The video features multiple dancers in the club as Yankee performs the song on a stage. The main dancer for this video has also been featured in a number of other videos by Daddy Yankee.

== Chart positions ==
Chart (2007–2008)	Peak position
Argentina Single Charts (CAPIF)	5
Chile (Top 100)	1
US Latin Songs (Billboard)	2
US Tropical Songs (Billboard)	4
US Bubbling Under Hot 100 (Billboard)	20
Venezuela Top 100 (Record Report)	13
Venezuela Top Latino (Record Report)	2

== Certifications ==
Region	Certification	Certified units/sales
Spain (Promusicae)	2× Platinum	120,000^{‡}
^{‡} Sales+streaming figures based on certification alone.

== See also ==
- List of Billboard Latin Rhythm Airplay number ones of 2007
