= La Despedida =

2010 song performed by Daddy Yankee

Single by Daddy Yankee

from the album Mundial
- Released: August 4, 2010
- Recorded: 2009
- Genre: Reggaeton, Merengue
- Length: 3:23
- Label: Sony Music; El Cartel Records
- Songwriter: Ramón Ayala
- Producers: Musicologo & Menes

Daddy Yankee singles chronology
| "Descontrol" (2010) | "La Despedida" (2010) | "Ven Conmigo" (2011) |

Tony Dize singles chronology
| "El Doctorado" (2009) | "La Despedida (Remix)" (2010) | "Si No Le Contesto (Remix)" (2010) |

"La Despedida" (English: "The Farewell") is a single by Puerto Rican reggaeton singer Daddy Yankee. It is the third official single released on August 4, 2010 from his album Mundial. The official remix of the song features American singer Tony Dize. This song resembles his other song ¿Qué Tengo Que Hacer?. The music video also resembles his other song's music video Llamado de Emergencia.

== Critical reception ==
Matthew Wilkening from AOL Radio Blog said that the song "combines an infectious mid-tempo dance beat with Latin horns and percussion, as Daddy Yankee bids farewell — but seemingly refuses to give up a lover who is moving away from him, despite his friends' best advice". It received an award for "Urban Song of the Year" at the 2012 ASCAP Awards, which are awarded annually by the American Society of Composers, Authors and Publishers in the United States.

== Music video ==
The music video for the song was released on August 23, 2010. It was directed by George Rivera and Juan Esteban Suárez. It shows the artist's mother-in-law going to the hospital for brain cancer, and shows the artist's wife shaving her head as a sympathy gesture.

== Versions ==
- Album version
- Official Remix (featuring Tony Dize)
- Bachata version
- Instrumental

Remixes

- Edson R'S Official Club Mix
- Edson R'S Official Instrumental Club Mix
- J. Rhythm & Ricky Luna Club Remix

== Charts and certifications ==
| Chart (2010–11) | Peak position |
|---|---|
| Argentina (Top 20) | 13 |
| Chile (Top 20) | 2 |
| Chile Airplay (Top Latino) | 1 |
| Colombian Airplay (Los 40) | 3 |
| Puerto Rico Airplay (Top Latino) | 1 |
| Spain (Promusicae) | 16 |
| US Hot Latin Songs (Billboard) | 4 |
| US Latin Pop Airplay (Billboard) | 3 |
| US Tropical Airplay (Billboard) | 4 |
| US Latin Rhythm Airplay (Billboard) | 1 |
| US Bubbling Under Hot 100 | 16 |

=== Year-end charts ===
| End of year chart (2010) | Position |
|---|---|
| US Latin Songs Year End 2010 | 28 |
| US Latin Pop Songs Year End 2010 | 23 |

=== Sales and certifications ===
| Region | Certification | Certified units/sales |
|---|---|---|
| Italy (FIMI) | Gold | 50,000^{‡} |
| Mexico (AMPROFON) | Gold | 30,000^{*} |
| Spain (Promusicae) | 3× Platinum | 300,000^{‡} |
^{*} Sales figures based on certification alone.^{‡} Sales+streaming figures based on certification alone.

== See also ==
- List of Billboard Latin Rhythm Airplay number ones of 2010
