= Latigazo =

Single by Daddy Yankee

from the album El Cangri.com
- Language: Spanish
- English title: "Whiplash"
- Released: 2002
- Genre: Reggaeton
- Length: 2:31
- Label: El Cartel
- Songwriter(s): Daddy Yankee

Daddy Yankee singles chronology
"Latigazo" (2002)	"Segurosqui" (2003)

Music video
- "Latigazo" on YouTube

"Latigazo" (English: "Whiplash") is the debut single by Puerto Rican rapper Daddy Yankee from his second studio album El Cangri.com, released on June 20, 2002. A music video for the song was released in order to promote the album. It has been cited as the first song by Daddy Yankee to receive significant airplay outside Puerto Rico.

== Reception ==
Writing for PopSugar, editor Celia Fernandez included "Latigazo" on her list of "25 Daddy Yankee Songs That We Can't Live Without" in July 2017.

== Music video ==
The music video for "Latigazo" was directed by Puerto Rican rapper and singer Eddie Dee, and was distributed by V.I. Music. The video features a brief cameo of American basketball player Kobe Bryant. An alternative version of the clip also includes other songs from El Cangri.com: "Son Las 12" and "Guayando" featuring Puerto Rican rapper Nicky Jam.
