= Los Homerun-es =

2003 compilation album by Daddy Yankee

Compilation album by Daddy Yankee
- Released: February 28, 2003 (Puerto Rico); 2005 (United States)
- Recorded: 1992–2003
- Genres: Reggaeton; dancehall; hip-hop
- Labels: Los Cangris, VI Music, Machete Music
- Producers: Raymond Ayala (exec.), DJ Blass, DJ Urba, Eliel, Rafi Mercenario, DJ Eric, DJ Playero

Daddy Yankee chronology
El Cangri.com (2002)	Los Homerun-es (2003)	Barrio Fino (2004)

Singles from Los Homerun-es
- 1. "Seguroski" Released: 2003; 2. "Gata Gangster (featuring Don Omar)" Released: 2003

Los Homerun-es is a compilation album and fifth overall of Reggaeton recording artist Daddy Yankee. It came before Yankee's mainstream debut, Barrio Fino. This album releases Daddy Yankee's hits from the 1990s to 2003. This album was released on an independent record label on February 28, 2003. Following the success of Barrio Fino, the album was re-released on 2005. Even though it was an independent album, it featured other huge reggaeton artists, like Nicky Jam, Don Omar, Julio Voltio. Some songs were released with DJ Playero.

To promote the album, he toured for the first time in Panama, Nicaragua and Honduras. Los Homerun-es debut at the Top 10 of the US Billboard Latin Albums charts, marking his first album to do so and one of the few reggaeton albums to made it at the time. The lead single "Seguroski" become his first song to chart and gain moderate airplay in the United States. Following the success of the album, he also performed on the first reggeaton summer fest at the Madison Square Garden in New York and his first major show as a headliner artist at the Roberto Clemente Coliseum in San Juan, Puerto Rico in August 2003.

== Track listing ==
No.	Title	From The Album	Length
1.	"Intro/Seguroski"	New Song	5:36
2.	"Musica Killa" (Nicky Jam)	New Song	3:58
3.	"Gata Gangster" (Don Omar)	New Song	3:41
4.	"Flow Gangsteril"	New Song	3:22
5.	"Mejor Que Tu Ex" (Remix)	DJ Dicky: No Fear 4 – Sin Miedo	2:51
6.	"Donde Mi No Vengas (37)"	Playero 37	2:00
7.	"Estan Locos (37)"	Playero 37	1:26
8.	"Sigan Brincando (37)"	Playero 37	1:32
9.	"Me Quedo (37)"	Playero 37	1:14
10.	"Yamilette (37)"	Playero 37	1:40
11.	"Ya Va Sonando (37)"	Playero 37	1:46
12.	"El Gistro Mix" (Interlude)	New song	3:05
13.	"No Te Canses, El Funeral (38)" (Julio Voltio)	Playero 38	4:14
14.	"Donde Estan las Giales"	Memo y Vale - Sueños De Destrucción	2:37
15.	"Soy Pelon, Muerte Yo Le Doy"		2:26
16.	"Baila Girl, Todo Hombre Llorando Por Ti (39)"	Playero 39	3:03
17.	"Camuflash (40)"	Playero 40	2:34
18.	"Que La Enamoren"	Benny Blanco: Tierra de Nadie	3:22
19.	"Corrupto Oficial (39)"	Playero 39	3:12
20.	"Mix Rap 1 (30-30/Mi Fanático/ Se Acelera El Flow)" (Nas, Yaviah, Notty)	Boricua Guerrero, El Cartel II: Los Cangris, The Flow	4:54
21.	"Mix Rap 2 (Sigo Algare/Enciende/Gargolas 2)"	El Cangri.com, Gargolas 2	5:50
22.	"Segurosqui" (Remix)	New Song	3:45
23.	"Outro" (Anuncio)	New song	0:59

- The original 2003 version had the intro and the song "Segurosqui" as separate tracks. Making the album have a total of 24 tracks.

== DVD ==
1. "Los Homerun-es Radio Version (Segurosqui/Gata Gangster)-Daddy Yankee & Don Omar
2. "Baila Girl/Todo Hombre Llorando Por Ti/
3. "No Te Canses/El Funeral
4. "Camuflash(40)

== Charts ==
Chart (2003)	Peak Position
US Heatseekers Albums (Billboard)	29
US Catalog Albums (Billboard)	20
US Independent Albums (Billboard)	17
US Latin Albums (Billboard)	8
US Latin Pop Albums (Billboard)	5
US Latin Rap/Hip-Hop Albums (Billboard)	4
Chart (2005)	Peak Position
US Billboard 200	158
US R&B Albums (Billboard)	63
US Latin Albums (Billboard)	7
US Tropical Albums (Billboard)	4
US Reggae Albums (Billboard)	3
