= No Mercy (Daddy Yankee album) =

Studio album by Daddy Yankee
- Released: April 1995
- Recorded: 1994–95
- Genres: Reggaeton; dancehall; hip-hop
- Length: 46:05
- Labels: White Lion; BM
- Producers: DJ Playero; Nico Canada

Daddy Yankee chronology
No Mercy (1995)	El Cartel (1997)

No Mercy is the debut studio album by Puerto Rican rapper Daddy Yankee and was released in April 1995 by independent labels White Lion Records and BM Records. Daddy Yankee made the album alongside reggaeton pioneer DJ Playero. This album had rhythms of hip-hop, reggae and dancehall. During this time, Daddy Yankee was known as "Winchesta 30-30" or "Winchesta Yankee". After his completion of No Mercy, he began to sell his cassettes in various stores and clubs, and performing for free in high school dances and private parties. After his mild success of No Mercy, many producers and artists began to work with him, taking then the name "Daddy Yankee".

== Track listing ==
No.	Title	Producer(s)	Length
1.	"Prelude Opus Yankee (Intro)"	DJ Playero; Nico Canada	2:22
2.	"Run Come Follow Me"	DJ Playero	4:18
3.	"Chica Interesada"	DJ Playero	4:01
4.	"They Cry"	DJ Playero	4:18
5.	"Busca Una Yale"	DJ Playero	3:40
6.	"Oh My God!"	DJ Playero; Nico Canada	4:31
7.	"Dan De Dan"	DJ Playero; Nico Canada	3:40
8.	"La Soledad" (featuring Angel and Mariam)	DJ Playero; Nico Canada	4:38
9.	"Conserva Tu Figura" (featuring B.F. Yaviah and Gomy Man)	DJ Playero; Nico Canada	5:07
10.	"Shoat Outs"	DJ Playero; Nico Canada	2:39
Total length:			39:14

Bonus track
No.	Title	Producer(s)	Length
11.	"Raza Unida"	DJ Playero	6:51
Total length:			46:05

- The bonus track was a CD exclusive until the album was made available on digital.
