= El Ritmo No Perdona (Prende) =

2009 single by Daddy Yankee

"El Ritmo No Perdona 'Prende'"

Single by Daddy Yankee

from the album Daddy Yankee Mundial (iTunes edition)
- Released: July 1, 2009
- Recorded: 2009
- Genre: Reggaeton; merengue
- Length: 3:04
- Label: El Cartel Records, Sony Music
- Songwriter: Daddy Yankee
- Producers: Musicólogo and Menes

Daddy Yankee singles chronology
"¿Qué Tengo Que Hacer?" (2009)	"El Ritmo No Perdona 'Prende'" (2009)	"Grito Mundial" (2010)

"El Ritmo No Perdona 'Prende'" (English: The Rhythm Does Not Forgive "Turn It On") is a song by Daddy Yankee from his studio album Daddy Yankee Mundial released on July 1, 2009. On Daddy Yankee's official website the song was free, and included the music video for mobile phones. The song was released as an iTunes bonus track for the album.

== Music video ==
Yankee in the music video for "El Ritmo No Perdona (Prende)".

The music video for "El Ritmo No Perdona (Prende)" was filmed entirely with the best video quality available in the suburb of Soho in New York City with over 100 extras and produced and directed by Georgie Rivera and Louanson Alers. The video features many female dancers in a club dancing.

The sticky issue is a song involving the tropical essence of various people from different nations and infected with the rhythm of the song and what is happening in the place. The music video shows a battle between characters from both versions of DY, while the rhythms of Reggaeton collide with those of Urban Merengue (also known as mambo de calle), song and music video was released the same day.

== Remix ==
Despite many rumors of rivalry, Don Omar confirmed on his Twitter account to be recorded a remix version of "El Ritmo No Perdona" with Yankee. The remix was planned to be included as a bonus track on Daddy Yankee Mundial, but in the end was not included.

== Formats and track listings ==
Digital download

1. "El Ritmo No Perdona (Prende)" (Album Version) - 3:03

== Charts ==
Chart (2009)	Peak position
Chile Airplay (EFE)	1
El Salvador Airplay (Top Latino)	4
Peru Airplay (UNIMPRO)	8
U.S. Latin Rhythm Airplay (Billboard)	2
U.S. Hot Latin Songs (Billboard)	48
Venezuela Top Latino (Record Report)	10
