= El Cartel (album) =

El Cartel de Yankee

Compilation album by Daddy Yankee
- Released: 1997
- Recorded: 1999–1997
- Genres: Reggaeton; hip-hop
- Length: 22:56 (Track A); 31:19 (Track B); 54:15 (Total)
- Labels: El Cartel Produccions, Guatauba Productions, VI Music
- Producers: Daddy Yankee, Manolo Guatauba (executive) Benny Blanco*, DJ Joe (7), DJ Nelson (4), DJ Goldy*, Nico Canada, Tony Touch & Coo-Kee (uncredited)

Daddy Yankee chronology
No Mercy (1995)	El Cartel de Yankee (1997)	El Cartel II : Los Cangris (2001)

Singles from El Cartel
- 1. "Posición (feat. Alberto Stylee)" Released: 1997; 2. "Mataron A Un Inocente (Hector & Tito)" Released: 1999; 3. "Por Que? (Eddie Dee)" Released: 1997; 4. "Que Sera Nuestro Destino (Cavalucci)" Released: 1997; 5. "Abran Paso (OGM & Oakley)" Released: 1997

El Cartel: Los Intocables (transl. The Cartel: The Untouchables) or El Cartel De Yankee (transl. Yankee’s Cartel) is the first El Cartel album by Daddy Yankee with various artists from Puerto Rico, including Hector y Tito, Alberto Stylee, Baby Ranks and more. The song "Posición" was featured in the movie One Tough Cop.

== Track listing ==
TRACK A - "El Cartel"

No.	Title	Performer(s)	Length
1.	"Intro Cartel"	Gallego	1:22
2.	"Posición"	Daddy Yankee and Alberto Stylee	3:05
3.	"Estamos Armados"	Panty Man and Nene Ganya	2:33
4.	"Cartel Mix"	David D' Ambulante, Buju Man, and Charlie y Laker	3:02
5.	"¿Por Qué?"	Eddie Dee	3:05
6.	"Para las Yales Que le Gustan Bailar"	Berny Man	2:46
7.	"Que Será Nuestro Destino"	Mr. Cavalucci	1:42
8.	"Mataron a Un Inocente"	Hector & Tito	2:04
9.	"Lirica Real"	Notty, Daddy Yankee, and Guatauba	3:17
Total length:			22:56

TRACK B - "Los Intocables"

No.	Title	Performer(s)	Length
1.	"Intro Intocable"	Point Breakers	1:42
2.	"No Me Corre Police"	Daddy Yankee and Rey Pirin	3:07
3.	"Tu Desnudar"	Nico Canada	1:39
4.	"Oye Mi Voz"	Miguel Play and Baby Ranks	2:15
5.	"Intocables"	Ranking Stone	2:09
6.	"Esto Es Cosa Nuestra"	Sanguinario	2:16
7.	"Abran Paso"	O.G.M. and Oakley	3:20
8.	"Trampa"	Piedras Clan	1:33
9.	"Pongan Atención"	Original Q and Berny Man	3:44
10.	"No Tienes el Pasión del Señor"	Baby J	2:05
11.	"Te Provoco"	Glory	2:00
12.	"Puerto Rico Mafia"	Las Gárgolas	2:31
13.	"Posición" (Radio Version)	Daddy Yankee and Alberto Stylee	2:58
Total length:			31:19

== Music videos/singles ==
- Posicion - Daddy Yankee Winchester 30/30 & Alberto Stylee
- Radio Version (Mataron un Inocente/ Por Que ?/ Que Sera Nuestro Destino) - Hector Y Tito & Eddie Dee & Mr. Cavalucci
- Abran Paso - O.G.M. & Oakley
