= El Cangri.com =

2002 studio album by Daddy Yankee

Studio album by Daddy Yankee
- Released: June 20, 2002
- Recorded: 2001–2002
- Genres: Reggaeton; hip-hop
- Length: 44:15
- Label: VI
- Producer: DJ Blass

Daddy Yankee chronology
El Cartel II (2001)	El Cangri.com (2002)	Los Homerun-es (2003)

Singles from El Cangri.com
- 1. "Latigazo" Released: 2002; 2. "Son las 12:00" Released: 2002; 3. "Guayando (feat. Nicky Jam)" Released: 2002; 4. "¿Recuerdas? (feat. Speedy)" Released: 2003; 5. "¡Dimelo! (feat. Divino)" Released: 2003; 6. "Ella Está Soltera (feat. Nicky Jam)" Released: 2003

Professional ratings
Review scores
Source	Rating
AllMusic	3/5 stars

El Cangri.com is the second studio album by Puerto Rican rapper Daddy Yankee. It was released in 2002 by VI Music. The album was a success in Puerto Rico and the Dominican Republic with songs "Latigazo", "Muévete y Perrea", "¡Dimelo!" and "Ella Está Soltera". "Latigazo" also received mainstream success in Spanish-language radio stations in Miami and New York City in the United States. According to Yankee himself, he manufactured and distributed the record and sold over 50,000 copies.

== Track listing ==
No.	Title	Length
1.	"Intro - Cangri"	2:08
2.	"Latigazo"	2:31
3.	"Guayando" (featuring Nicky Jam)	3:01
4.	"¿Recuerdas?" (featuring Speedy)	3:12
5.	"Son Las 12:00 AM"	3:16
6.	"¡Dimelo!" (featuring Divino)	3:13
7.	"Muevete Y Perrea" (Nota Mix)	2:44
8.	"Ella Está Soltera" (featuring Nicky Jam)	3:08
9.	"Le Gusta A La Mujer" (featuring Yaga & Mackie Ranks)	3:36
10.	"Interlude"	0:53
11.	"No Te Canses"	2:34
12.	"Interlude"	0:41
13.	"El Cangri" (featuring Lito & Polaco)	3:28
14.	"Interlude"	0:44
15.	"Enciende"	3:59
16.	"Sigo Algare"	2:48
17.	"Brugal Mix"	1:45
18.	"Outro"	0:34
Total length:		44:15

== Charts ==
Chart (2002)	Peak Position
US Latin Albums (Billboard)	43
US Latin Pop Albums (Billboard)	13
US Latin Rap/Hip-Hop Albums (Billboard)	10
