= Nova & Jory =

Puerto Rican reggaeton duo

- Also known as: Las Dos Nuevas Amenazas, Nova "La Amenaza" (Nova); La N y La J, Jory "Boy", "La Jota", "El De La J" (Jory)
- Genres: Reggaeton, hip hop, Latin pop
- Instruments: Vocals, piano, drums
- Years active: 2003–2012 (on hiatus)
- Labels: 2007 BandLandz Entertainment; 2008–2009 Black Jack Music; 2009–2011 Millones Records; 2011–2012 Loud Musics

Nova & Jory (also known as Nova y Jory) were a reggaeton duo. Nova was born in Ponce, Puerto Rico, and Jory was born in Carolina, Puerto Rico. They started their career in 2003 and were signed to Loud Music at the time of their split. Their debut and only album Mucha Calidad was officially released on July 12, 2011, after multiple delays and setbacks. In October 2012 they announced they had split amicably. Both artists are now pursuing independent solo careers.

== Early years and debut ==
Nova was born in Ponce, Puerto Rico and raised by a single mother in Ponce metropolitan area, Santa Isabel and Peñuelas, Puerto Rico. Fernando Sierra, better known as "Jory" was born on July 5, 1986, in Carolina, Puerto Rico, and raised in the Residencial Torres de Sabana. Both performers had always shown great interest in the Latin urban genre of Reggaeton, and both had childhood dreams of being professional singers of this musical style. At a young age, and through different circumstances, they moved to the United States. Jory was 10 when he moved to the U.S., while Nova moved at age 15 and was married at 16. Jory was raised in Camden, New Jersey. Jory is also cousins with Zion from the duo Zion & Lennox.

== Career ==
Both performers participated in many events, talent shows, and televised competitions separately. In 2003, they met and agreed to do a song together. After finding success with that first song, they became a music duo and create their first mixtape titled Por Encima. As a duo, they also collaborated with other prominent artists of the genre, including Ñejo & Dalmata, Wisin & Yandel, Zion & Lennox, and Jowell & Randy.

Since 2007 they have been assisted by BadLandz Entertainment in bringing their talent to the masses, including marketing their talent in Puerto Rico. Due in part to their label, they decide to make the move back to Puerto Rico to solidify what they had already been working on and emerge on the scene as new members of the genre. In Puerto Rico they collaborated with Guelo Star on a track titled "Es la Impresion." They also helped produce Yai y Toly's song "Los Nativos". Due mostly to "Es la impresion", the duo become a big hit. They befriended Syko "El Terror" (Syko The terror) and developed what is now their permanent studio, "Empresario Studio". They worked with their producer, "Onyx", to bring their careers to new levels.

The duo collaborated with Syko and Cosculluela on creating "Bienvenidos a Mi Mundo", a crude street song expressing the hardships of poverty and violence. The track helped give them more public exposure, leading to much recognition. The song was followed with a remix (feat. Zion, Franco "el Gorila", Ñejo, Polaco and others). After, they worked with Yaga & Mackie on "Perfume". The duo continue to be well received.

In 2008 they broke with BandLandz, signing with Black Jack Music and releasing their second mixtape, "Salimos del Bloque", with support from Alex Corolla, AK 47, and Real Talk Reggaeton.

One of the tracks on the mixtape, Traila (Produced by Live Music) caught significant attention and airplay. However, it was not until the release of the song "Bien Loco" that they received significant attention throughout Central and South America, specially in Venezuela, Colombia, Panama, and Chile. Bien Loco became one of the top songs of 2009. This prompted a tour of these countries. Following their success, they released other singles such as "Matador" as well as a remix with Ñengo Flow, "No Seas Mala" (feat. Trebol Clan). They participated in the mega remix "Rastrillea 2." More recently they signed with Millones Records, and have collaborated with producers such as Walde "The Big Maker", Sinfónico, Jan Paul, Omi Colchea, Yampi, Dj Nelson, Montana The Producer, Onyx, Ruff, and Iván Lee.

In late 2011, they announced via social media that their contract had ended with Millones Records and publicly stated that they would be joining Loud Music in early 2012. As they continued to tour around South America to promote their debut album, they collaborated on remixes alongside other new generation artists as J. Alvarez and Farruko. They have also been produced by "Los de la Nazza," Musicologo & Menes in-house producers of Daddy Yankee's El Cartel Records. They were also in the works of creating a follow-up album titled Mucha Calidad Reloaded scheduled for release in 2012.

== Solo careers ==
Both Nova and Jory have had successful careers as solo artists starting in 2013.

=== Jory Boy ===
Jory Boy
- Also known as: Jory, Jory "Boy"
- Born: Fernando Luis Sierra Benitez; 5 July 1986 (age 40); Carolina, Puerto Rico
- Genre: Reggaeton
- Occupation: Singer
- Label: La Isla del Entretenimiento Inc.

Fernando Luis Sierra Benitez, known as Jory Boy or just Jory was born on 4 July 1986 in Carolina, Puerto Rico. He migrated to the United States with his family at age 10, settling in Philadelphia, Pennsylvania with his 3 brothers. At age 14, his father was killed in Puerto Rico. He wrote his first song in response. At age 18, he became part of "Yvan y Jory" and recorded his first release with the group Sug Music. Soon after, Sug Music split, going in different paths. Immediately after he formed a duo with Nova as Nova & Jory. The duo lasted for 10 years before the splitting amicably.

In the first year of his solo career starting 2013, Jory Boy was part of the "The Formula" under Pina Records, where he composed the song "More" which launched him internationally as a soloist. The release was credited as Zion and Ken feat. Jory (La Formula). Jory's solo hits "Romeo y Julieta" and "Noches de Fantasía" followed in 2013 and 2014. In 2015, he was signed to with the new company "Young Boss Entertainment Inc" and the label "La Isla del Entretenimiento Inc." working on his debut solo album. Jory released his first much anticipated solo album Matando la Liga on September 25, 2015. Two promotional pre-release singles were launched, "Quédate Conmigo" and "Por Qué Cambiar," both of which became international hits. As part of promotion to launch the album, he embarked on a tour of the United States, Europe and Latin America. Jory's debut album was followed by the Otra Liga EP series.

In mid-2018, Jory Boy was denied entry into Chile, where he was scheduled to perform a concert, because of pending legal problems back home.

=== Nova ===
Nova
- Also known as: Las Dos Nuevas Amenazas, Nova "La Amenaza"
- Born: Fernando L. González; 3 October 1980 (age 46); Ponce, Puerto Rico
- Genre: Reggaeton
- Occupation: Singer
- Label: Compi Records Inc

Fernando L. González known as Nova and as Nova La Amenaza (Nova the Menace) was born in Santa Isabel, Puerto Rico. His reggaeton songs include "Aprovecha", "Besame", "Bien Loco", "Tú Eres De Esas", "Cazador", "Tengo Una Idea", "Adivina Que", "Boom Boom", "Esto Aquí No Para" etc. He was part of the Nova & Jory duo for 10 years. He released his solo debut album El Subestimado in 2015. He signed with the management company Compi Records Inc.

== Discography: Nova & Jory ==
=== Albums ===
Year	Album
2011	Mucha Calidad

=== Mixtapes ===
Year	Album	Notes
2007	Por Encima	
2009	Salimos del Bloque	
2010	Mucha Calidad Pre-Album Mixtape	Pre-release to Mucha Calidad
2010	Mucha Calidad Pre-Album Mixtape Vol. 2	Pre-release to Mucha Calidad

=== Singles and collaborations ===
- Saco El Anormal (2007)
- Me Tienes Maquiniando (2007)
- Tu (2007)
- El Pantalon (2007)
- Dejate Llevar (2007)
- Parece Que Fue Ayer (2007)
- La Primera Noche (2007)
- Bounce (2007)
- Encima De Ti (2007)
- Como Lo Menea (2007)
- Por Encima (2007)
- Bienvenidos A Mi Mundo (feat. Cosculluela, Syko) (2008)
- Bien Loco (2008)
- Es La Impresión (feat. Guelo Star) (2008)
- Perfume (feat. Yaga y Mackie, Syko) (2008)
- Bla Bla Bla (2009)
- Rastrillea (feat. Guelo Star, Arcángel, Julio Voltio, Alexis & Fido, Ñengo Flow, Baby Rasta & Gringo, Yaga & Mackie, Ivy Queen, Syko, Tony Lenta, Gastam, Chyno Nyno, Ñejo & Dalmata, Trebol Clan, Nova & Jory, Franco "El Gorilla", OG Black & Guayo Man, Plan B, Zion & Lennox, De La Ghetto) (2009)
- El Mal Me Persigue (feat. Ñengo Flow, Randy Glock) (2009)
- Traila (2009)
- La Falda (feat. Mega Sexx) (2009)
- Pa Ta Bajo Contigo (feat. Godiel y Naldy) (2009)
- Somos Dos (2009)
- Juegos Nada Mas (Gerry Capo feat. Jory) (2009)
- Te Quiero Sin Ropa (Ñengo Flow feat. Jory) (2009)
- No Hay Ley (Ñengo Flow feat. Jory, John Jay, Chyno Nyno, Delirious) (2009)
- Matador (Ñengo Flow feat. Jory) (2009)
- Matador (Remix) (Ñengo Flow feat. Nova & Jory, Alexis & Fido, Jowell & Voltio) (2009)
- Tiempo Y Hora (2009)
- No Seas Mala (Trebol Clan feat. Nova & Jory) (2009)
- Alejate De Mi (Jory) (2009)
- Con Mucho Fronte (feat. Syko) (2009)
- Juquea (Nova & Jory feat. Yelsid, Shako, Mary Oquendo y Sheeno) (2009)
- Tu Cuerpo (Ryan feat. Jory) (2009)
- Terapia (Nova & Jory feat. Mega y Kenai) (2009)
- La Vida Es Corta (Yomo feat. Jory, Randy Glock) (2010)
- La Calle es pa' Hombre (Nova feat. Randy Glock, Ñengo Flow, Getto, Yomo) (2009)
- La Noche Perfecta (2010)
- Un Poco Mas (2010)
- Maniatico (2010)
- Dartelo Hoy (Jory feat. Amareto) (2010)
- Musica En High (Nova & Jory feat. Berto "El Original") (2010)
- Nuestro Ultimo Palo (Jory feat. Ñengo Flow) (2010)
- No Hay Nadie Como Ella (Eloy feat. Jory) (2010)
- Aunque No Lo Digas (Great Galdy feat. Jory) (2010)
- Ya Se Lo Que Tu Buscas (Polaco feat. Jory) (2010)
- Adivina Que (feat. Yomo) (2010)
- Mi Combo Jala (Pacho y Cirilo feat. Jory) (2010)
- Mi Combo Jala (Remix) (Pacho y Cirilo feat. Jory, Kendo Kaponi, Jomar, Voltio) (2010)
- Mucha Calidad (feat. Pacho y Cirilo, Ñengo Flow, Wibal y Alex, Franco "El Gorila", Chyno Nyno, Delirious) (2010)
- Besame (2010)
- Sexo (2010)
- Soy Yo (Marvin feat. Jory) (2010)
- Por El Celu (Nos "El 5 Estrellas" feat. Jory) (2010)
- Pata Boom (Daddy Yankee feat. Jory) (2010)
- Ojitos Achinao (Nova) (2010)
- No Pide Novio (Gavilan feat. Jory) (2010)
- Las 3Js (Jory feat. J Alvarez, Juno "The Hitmaker") (2010)
- No Se Que Hacer (JJ La Promesa feat. Nova) (2010)
- Move Your Body (Remix) (Xavi "The Destroyer" feat. J Alvarez, Guelo Star, Nova, Randy, Juno "The Hitmaker") (2011)
- El Bonitillo (2011)
- Ojitos Achinao (Remix) (Nova feat. Ñengo Flow, Guelo Star, Voltio, Jay-D Y Magix) (2011)
- Tu Eres Otra Cosa (Jory feat. Ñengo Flow) (2011)
- Boom Boom (Remix) (feat. Magnate y Valentino, J Alvarez) (2011)
- Hola Beba (Remix) (Jory feat. Farruko, J Alvarez) (2011)
- Todas Las Solteras (Jory feat. Gocho, Ñengo Flow) (2011)
- Besame (Remix) (feat. Rakim & Ken-Y) (2011)
- Yo Se Que Quieres (feat. Alexis & Fido) (2011)
- Hoy (Remix) (Jory feat. Farruko, Daddy Yankee, J Alvarez) (2011)
- Que Quieres De Mi (Remix) (feat. Gotay "El Autentiko", Ñengo Flow, Farruko, J Alvarez) Prod. By Kastro (2011)
- Pata Boom (Remix) (Jory feat. Daddy Yankee, Alexis & Fido, Jowell y Randy) (2011)
- Aprovecha (feat. Daddy Yankee) (2011)
- No Se (2011)
- Bien Comodo (feat. Daddy Yankee, Randy, J Alvarez, Guelo Star, Arcángel, Baby Rasta & Gringo, Yaga & Mackie) (2011)
- La Curiosidad Me Mata (Nova feat. J Albert) (2011)
- Me Tumba El Fronte (Nova feat. El Negro Mou) (2011)
- Noche De Nuvo (Nova feat. Majadero) (2011)
- Fugemonos Esta Noche (Nova feat. Joniel) (2011)
- Loco Por Tu Amor (Jory feat. Siniestro) (2011)
- Seguimos Receptivos (Jory feat. Sou Y O.A.) (2011)
- Bellaquera (Remix) (La Jota feat. Voltio, Juno "The Hitmaker", Nova, Cheka, JQ) (2011)
- Un Saludo A Las Nenas (feat. Mozart La Para) (2011)
- Alejate De Mi (Remix) (Jory feat. Trebol Clan) (2011)
- Alejate De Mi (Remix to the Remix) (Jory feat. Jessikita) (2011)
- Plastica (Jory feat. Kervin "El Increible") (2011)
- Salieron A Cazar (Nova feat. JP "El Sinico") (2011)
- Pierden Los Modales (Jory feat. JP "El Sinico") (2011)
- Plástica (Jory feat. Farruko, J Alvarez) (2011)
- Presten Atencion (Jory feat. Carlitos Rossy) (2011)
- Solo Pasajero (Jory feat. Lui-G 21+) (2011)
- Diri Diri (Jory feat. Ñengo Flow) (2011)
- Naki (2011)
- Mi Atencion Atrapa (Nova) (2012)
- Tiempo Pasado, Tiempo Perdido (Jory) (2012)
- Tu Novio No La Hace (2012)
- Si Supieras (Jory feat. Jowell) (2012)
- Sustancia ( Jory feat. Ñejo & Dalmata)
- Mi chiquita remix (Nova feat. Fade, Juno "The Hitmaker", Galante"El emperador", Jadiel"El incomparable")
- Dejame Saber (Jory feat. Gotay "El Autentiko" & Nengo Flow) (2012)
- Yo Sé (Remix) (Khriz John feat. Gotay "El Autentiko", Nova, Santana "The Golden Boy") (2012
- Una Noche Inolvidable (Jory) (2012)
- Una Aventura (Gotay "El Autentiko" feat. Jory) (2012)
- More (Jory feat. Zion & Ken-Y) (2012)
- Ya Nada Es Asi (Jory feat. Gotay "El Autentiko") (2012)
- Mátame (Remix) (Anonimus feat. Eloy, Killatonez, Nova) (2012)
- Mi Gatita Es Calle (Nova) (2012)
- Que Casualidad (Jory) (2012)
- Quien te Atiende Como Yo (Remix) (El Majadero feat. Ñengo Flow, Nova, Guelo Star, Chyno Nyno, OG Black & Master Joe) (2012)
- Modelo De Revista (Jory) (2012)
- Romeo & Julieta (Jory) (2013)
- No Le Digas A Nadie (Nova feat. Gotay) (2013)
- Solo En Sueños (Nova) (2013)
- De Ti Depende (Jory feat. Plan B) (2013)
- Negarlo Todo (Maluma feat. Jory) (2013)
- Sigo Esperandote (Jory) (2013)
- Sistema (Wisin feat. Jory) (2013)
- Once Again (Jory feat. Lui-G 21 Plus) (2013)
- Lo Que Ofrezco de Gratis (Nova feat. Lui-G 21 Plus) (2013)
- Matando la liga (Jory feat. R2)
- La Pasión Me Llama (Nova feat. RKM) (2013)
- Ponle Dj (Nova feat. Farruko) (2013)
- Me Niegas (Remix) (Jory feat. Baby Rasta & Gringo & Ñengo Flow) (2013)
- Inevitable (Jory feat. La Jota) (2013)
- Lo Hacemos En Secreto (Remix) (Mr.Frank & Gabyson feat. Jory)
- Dime Baby (Jory) (2013)
- Otra Vez (Nova) (2013)
- Solo en Sueños (Nova) (2013)
- Enseñame (Carlitos Rossy feat. Pipe Calderon, Nova, El Cata, XRIZ, El Jotha, Raymond Ray) (2013)
- Detras De Ti (Farruko feat. Jory) (2014)
- Claro (Wisin feat. Jory) (2014)
- No Te Illusiones (Jory Boy feat. Carlito Rossy) (2014)

== Discography: Jory Boy ==
=== Extended Releases ===
Jory

Year	Album	Peak positions	Notes
Year	Album	US Latin	Notes
2015	Matando La Liga	#3 Top Latin	#1 latin rhythm
2016	"Otra Liga"	# 19 Top Latin	# 2 latin rhythm
2018	Otra Liga 2		
2020	Creme De La Creme		
2021	La Esencia		
2022	Bubblegum		

=== Singles ===
- "More" (ft. Zion & Ken-Y) (2012)
- "Romeo y Julieta" (2013)
- "Noches de Fantasía" (2014)
- "Un Pirata" (June 15, 2014)
- "Mucho Dembow" (June 15, 2014)
- "No Me Llamas, No Te Llamo" (July 4, 2014)
- "Noches De Fantasía" (ft, Farruko & J Alvarez) (October 18, 2014)
- "Quédate Conmigo" (2014)
- "Por Que Cambiar” (ft. Plan B) (August 28, 2018)
- "Bonita" (2015)
- "Por Qué Cambiar" (Solo Version) (2015)
- "Volvió La Peste" (November 27, 2015)
- "Imposible Amor" (Salsa Version) (May 20, 2016)
- "Detras De Ti" (May 27, 2016)
- ”Cuentos de Cama” (ft. Alexio “La Bestia”) (September 2, 2016)
- "Detrás De Ti" (ft. Ozuna)(Official Remix) (September 30, 2016)
- "No Te Hagas" (w/Bad Bunny) (March 11, 2017)
- "Desafio" (ft. Maluma) (August 4, 2017)
- "Nada Serio" (w/Almighty) (October 5, 2017)
- "No Me Busques" (February 16, 2018)
- "Ying Yang" (ft. J Alvarez) (April 27, 2018)

== Discography: Nova ==
Year	Album	Peak positions	Notes
Year	Album	US Latin	Notes
2015	El Subestimado		
