= Gotay =

Puerto Rican-American songwriter

Gotay El Autentiko
- Also known as: El Autentico
- Born: Alexis Gotay Pérez; June 22, 1985 (age 41); Brooklyn, New York, U.S.
- Origin: Yauco, Puerto Rico
- Genre: Reggaeton
- Occupations: Singer; songwriter
- Instrument: Vocals
- Years active: 2008–present
- Label: Autentik Music

External audio
- You may view songs in Spanish of Gotay here

Alexis Gotay Pérez (born June 22, 1985), known artistically as Gotay, is an American singer and songwriter from Puerto Rico. He was born in Brooklyn to a Puerto Rican family, and eventually moved with them to the city of Bayamón, Puerto Rico. Their album El Del Vibrato and its subject "Real Love" held the number-one position on several charts in Latin America, and was at the top of many playlists on radio stations in the United States and Puerto Rico. It reached the top 20 on the Billboard Latin Rhythm chart. Gotay publishes with the record company Autentik Music.

== Discography ==
=== Studio albums ===
- 2013: El Del Vibrato
- 2017: El Chamaquito De Ahora
- 2020: Autentik

=== Mixtapes ===
- 2011: El Concepto
- 2012: Imperio Nazza: Gotay Edition
