= Mundial (album) =

Studio album by Daddy Yankee
- Released: April 27, 2010
- Recorded: December 2008 – July 30, 2009
- Genres: Reggaeton; hip-hop; Latin hip-hop; merengue; dancehall
- Length: 41:03
- Labels: El Cartel; Sony Latin
- Producers: Los de la Nazza; Diesel

Daddy Yankee chronology
Talento de Barrio (2009)	Mundial (2010)	Prestige (2012)

Mundial ('Worldwide') is the sixth studio album and tenth overall by Puerto Rican rapper Daddy Yankee through El Cartel Records and Sony Music Latin released on April 27, 2010. The album was supported by three official singles: "Grito Mundial", "Descontrol" and "La Despedida". The production explores different music genres than his previous records such as merengue, dance pop and Latin Pop along with reggaeton. It explores lyrics and themes such as romance, sex, money and fame while the main focus is to capture music vibes of the streets of different countries globally. The album was entirely produced by Los de la Nazza and Diesel.

The album was his fifth album the debut at the top of US Billboard Top Latin Albums and peaked there for four consecutive weeks. Also, it peaked at 29 in Billboard 200 and charted in Ecuador, Chile, Venezuela, Uruguay and Mexico as well. The lead single Grito Mundial was intended to be 2010 FIFA World Coup official song, but those plans were later scrapped. Despite this, the track was chosen for World Cup TV campaigns on Telefutura and ESPN in the United States and on Azteca in Mexico.

Mundial was nominated for a Lo Nuestro Award for Urban Album of the Year and for Best Urban Album at the 10th Annual Latin Grammy Awards . It won the Billboard Latin Music Award for Latin Rhythm Album of the Year in 2011. To promote the album, he performed as an actor in five episodes of CBS soap opera "The Bold and the Beautiful" and latter embarked on the Mundial Tour which contains his first official Europe Leg.

== Background ==
As of early 2010, Daddy Yankee had sold eight million copies worldwide. Barrio Fino was named the Top Selling Latin Album of in The United States of the 2000s and he was crowned as The Top Selling Latin Act of the 2000s. Initially, Mundial was intended to be a special edition of his previous album Talento de Barrio. Following the box office success of his movie Talento de Barrio, the soundtrack (2008) and the success of the Talento de Barrio Tour, Yankee decided to release Talento de Barrio: Mundial Edition as both an album and a mixtape in 2009.

In an interview for Laredo Morning Times in December 2008, Yankee announced that the title of his next album would be "Daddy Yankee Mundial" and stated that he's already working on a new movie for next year. On January 29, 2009, Yankee stated that he started working on the new album and the track "Echale Pique" was release to the radio as promotional single of the album. However, the track ended up on the Mixtape Talento de Barrio Mundial. Also, Yankee announced that the next single would be "Bailando Fue" with Jowell & Randy.

The original released date of the album was in June 2009 with plans of a promotional tour in Mexico. However, it was push back to October 2009 and later to February 2010, due the success of the singles of his previous album. "El Ritmo No Perdona" was released as a promotional single on June 30, 2009, and was available for free download on his website page. At a press conference on July 23, 2009, Yankee stated that week he would be finishing the recording of the album. On October 8, 2009, Grito Mundial was released to the airways as the first official single of the album. The tracks were intended to be the official anthem of the FIFA world cup 2010. The music video was recorded in Brazil and was sponsored by Coors Light. On a press conference on December 2, 2009, Yankee explained that the album had 12 tracks and another four for an iTunes special edition and that the concept of the album is to fusion of the world rhythms in just one album stating "I have had the opportunity to travel the entire world, incorporating all the sounds in a single album without losing the urban flavor that I represent in my music". On November 18, 2009, Yankeer started a small promotional tour sponsored by Coors Light in private venues visiting cities such as Houston, Dallas, Filadelfia, Chicago y Nueva York and was very well receive by the fans.

In January 2010, Daddy Yankee entered a new partnership between El Cartel Records and Sony Music. The singer described the move as a major step in his career and credited Sony’s infrastructure as a key reason behind the agreement. The project was introduced at a time of renewed industry recognition, as Billboard Latino honored him as the top-selling urban artist of the previous decade and several of his earlier albums received multi-platinum certifications. Mundial was officially released on April 27, 2010.

Unlike his last three albums, Mundial wasn't released through Interscope and Universal Music Group. For this reason, the tracks recorded with Luis Fonsi and Don Omar ("Desafio) weren't included on the official tracklist. However, those songs were leaked online. Also, on his birthday he released a new song "Intenso", but said that it was not going to be on the album. Furthermore, in April 2023, Yankee file a lawsuit against Universal Music Ground seeking US$10 million of dollars for damages due breach of contract, copyright infringement, unjust enrichment and unauthorized exploitation of his albums, stating that even thought the contract was expire, UMG still licensing and distributing his music, including his blockbuster album Barrio Fino (2004).

== Album title and release ==
=== Title ===
About the title of the album, he said: "Reflects my experiences lived in all promotional trips, in summary, Daddy Yankee Mundial is an album with a great musical variety where The Street joins The World."

=== Release ===
The album was first intended to be released on 13 October 2009, then 17 November 2009, and was then postponed to 13 April 2010. The album was finally released on 27 April 2010. During its first week of release, the album debuted on the US Billboard 200 at number 29, selling over 18,500 copies. Also, the album at number one on Billboard Top Latin Albums Chart and stayed at the top for four consecutive weeks. As of 2012, it had sold over 58,000 copies in the United States. Also it was his fifth album to top US Latin Rhythm Albums.

The album also charted in Uruguay, Mexico, Venezuela and Japan. In Argentina, the album was certified gold for selling over 20,000 copies. Also, it was certified gold in Chile. Also, in Chile the album peaked at 7 at the retail charts according to La Feria del Disco. In Mexico it peaked at number 28 and at number 2 in Uruguay album charts. In Venezuela, it peaked at number 3 on the retail album charts according to Recorland.

== Promotion ==
Professional ratings
Review scores
Source	Rating
AllMusic	3.5/5 stars
El Nuevo Herald	(Positive)
Los Angeles Times	2/4 stars
Washington Post	(Positive)

=== Singles ===
Official singles

- "Grito Mundial" was released as the official first single on 8 October 2009 and digitally on October 20, 2009. The music video was filmed in Argentina & Brazil and was premiered on 20 January 2010. The song peaked on #7 on the Billboard Latin Rhythm Airplay. The song was chosen as the official anthem for the 2010 FIFA World Cup but since Ayala would not have owned 100% of the song on profits, he declined and decided to give it to the federation. They chose Colombian singer Shakira's Waka Waka (This Time for Africa) instead.
- "Descontrol" is the second single released for airplay on 12 January 2010 and digitally on 23 February 2010. The song topped the Billboard Latin Rhythm Airplay, and a music video was filmed for the song in New York City and was released on 17 May 2010.
- "La Despedida" is the third single released on 4 August 2010. The song has become the most successful song on the album, reaching #4 in both Billboard Top Latin Songs and Latin Pop Songs. Also, the song has entered the top 10 in many Latin countries due to heavy airplay.

Promo singles

- "El Ritmo No Perdona (Prende)" was released for free download through his official website on 1 July 2009 as the album's buzz single, and the music video was released the same date. The song peaked at number #2 on Billboard Latin Rhythm Airplay. The song is not part of the main track list, but was included as iTunes bonus track of the album.

== Track listing ==
Standard Edition
No.	Title	Writer(s)	Producer(s)	Length
1.	"El Mejor De Todos Los Tiempos (Intro)"	Raymond Ayala	Los De La Nazza	2:50
2.	"Descontrol"	Ayala	Los De La Nazza	2:53
3.	"Vida En La Noche"	Ayala	Los De La Nazza	3:47
4.	"La Señal"	Ayala	Los De La Nazza	2:54
5.	"La Despedida"	Ayala	Los De La Nazza	3:23
6.	"¿Qué Es La Que Hay?"	Ayala	Los De La Nazza	3:06
7.	"Me Enteré" (featuring Tito El Bambino)	Ayala	Los De La Nazza	3:07
8.	"El Más Duro"	Ayala	Los De La Nazza	2:56
9.	"Daría"	Ayala	Los De La Nazza	3:36
10.	"Rumba y Candela"	Ayala	Los De La Nazza	3:09
11.	"Mintiendo Con La Verdad"	Ayala	Los De La Nazza	3:11
12.	"Campeo A Mi Manera"	Ayala; David Sanchez (Chorus taken from Tempo's «Porque Soy Tempo»)	Diesel	3:13
13.	"Grito Mundial"	Ayala	Los De La Nazza	3:04
Total length:				35:10

Deluxe Version
No.	Title	Writer(s)	Producer(s)	Length
14.	"Viejas Andadas"	Ayala	Los De La Nazza	2:49
15.	"El Ritmo No Perdona"	Ayala	Los De La Nazza	3:04
Total length:				41:03

== Chart performance ==
Chart (2010–11)	Peak position
Ecuadorian Albums (Musicalisimo)	14
Japanese Albums (Oricon)	232
Mexican Albums Chart	28
US Billboard Top Latin Albums	1
US Latin Rhythm Albums (Billboard)	1
US Billboard Top Rap Albums	10
US Billboard 200	29
Uruguayan Albums (CUD)	2

== Certifications ==
Region	Certification	Certified units/sales
Argentina (CAPIF)	Gold	20,000^{^}
Chile (IFPI)	Gold	
^{^} Shipments figures based on certification alone.

== See also ==
- List of number-one Billboard Latin Albums from the 2010s
- List of number-one Billboard Latin Rhythm Albums of 2010
