= El Cartel II =

El Cartel II Los Cangris

Compilation album by Daddy Yankee
- Released: March 15, 2001
- Recorded: 2000–2001
- Genres: Reggaeton; hip-hop
- Length: 37:15
- Labels: El Cartel Productions, Pina Records, VI Music
- Producers: DJ Dicky & DJ Magic

Daddy Yankee chronology
El Cartel de Yankee (1997)	El Cartel II Los Cangris (2001)	El Cangri.com (2003)

Singles from El Cartel II
- 1. "Tu Cuerpo En La Cama (feat. Nicky Jam)" Released: 2001; 2. "Se Unen O Se Mueren (Karel & Voltio)" Released: 2001; 3. "Nigga What What (MC Ceja)" Released: 2001

El Cartel II: Los Cangris or El Cartel De Yankee II is a compilation album by Daddy Yankee presenting many artists. The only album released by Pina Records and El Cartel Productions.

== Track listing ==
No.	Title	Performer(s)	Length
1.	"Intro"	Los Cangris	0:34
2.	"Tu Cuerpo En La Cama"	Daddy Yankee and Nicky Jam	2:34
3.	"Se Unen O Se Mueren"	Karel & Voltio	3:07
4.	"Los Cangris"	Don Chezina, Rey Pirin, and Daddy Yankee	3:55
5.	"Ritmo de la Calle"	Daddy Yankee and Nicky Jam	2:41
6.	"69"	Las Guanábanas	1:54
7.	"Mi Fanatico (diss to Tempo)"	Daddy Yankee	3:39
8.	"Intro - Mente & Corazón"	Daddy Yankee	0:34
9.	"Strip Tease"	Memo & Vale	1:47
10.	"Esto Es Pa Las Gatas"	Keeno	2:40
11.	"Deja Que La Chica"	Frankie Boy	3:08
12.	"Nigga What-What?"	MC Ceja	2:25
13.	"Boricua Warriors"	Nicky Jam and Keeno	2:25
14.	"Vamos A Enseñarle"	Ro-K and L.B.M.	2:49
15.	"¿Donde Están?"	Aaron	3:07
16.	"Adelanto La Conspiracion"	Polaco, MC Ceja, O.G. Black, Daddy Yankee, Falo, Rey Pirin & Alberto Stylee, and Karel.	1:55
Total length:			37:15

1. DVD Infomercial On Cartel 2
2. Radio Version Cartel 2 ("Tu Cuerpo En La Cama/ Se Unen O Se Mueren/ Nigga What What") - Daddy Yankee, Nicky Jam, Karel & Karel & Voltio, and MC Ceja
