= El Cartel Records =

Puerto Rican record label

- Parent company: BMG Rights Management (2026-present); Previously; Concord (2025-2026); Universal Music Group (2005-2011, 2019-2024); Sony Music Entertainment (1997-2004, 2013-2018); EMI (2012)
- Founded: August 26, 1997; 29 years ago (as El Cartel Productions)
- Founder: Daddy Yankee
- Defunct: April 23, 2025; 18 months ago
- Distributor: Universal Music Group
- Genre: Reggaeton
- Country of origin: Puerto Rico
- Location: San Juan

El Cartel Records (formerly known as Los Cangris Inc. and El Cartel Productions) was a Puerto Rican record label. The release of Barrio Fino, Daddy Yankee's first commercially successful album, is notable for being the label's first distributed album.

On October 18, 2024, Concord acquired El Cartel's catalog. The acquisition, including both publishing and master recordings.

The label shut down on April 23, 2025, amidst a lawsuit with Daddy Yankee's ex-wife, Mireddys González and her sister Ayeicha González Castellanos. After the record company closed, Concord merged the El Cartel catalog with Craft Latino and later merged itself with BMG.

== Artists ==
Act	Year signed	Albums under Cartel	Description
Daddy Yankee	1997	13	Rapper from San Juan, Puerto Rico, he founded the label in 1997, The first song under this label is "Peligro" from the album "DJ Goldy 3 The Melody".
Brytiago	2015	-	Artist from Puerto Rico, presented in Yankee's single "Alerta Roja".
Pusho (el MVP)	2014	-	He is a rapper from Puerto Rico, who is famous for freestyle's in the internet. He is currently not signed with El Cartel Records anymore and now is part of Casa Blanca Records.
Merk Montes	2013	-	Rapper from United States. Formerly known as J-Merk from the collective 'Mascare Musical' with De La Ghetto & Alex Kyza.
Los de la Nazza	2007	3	Duo composed of producer's Eli El Musicologo & Menes El De La Nazza.

== Former artists ==
Act	Years on the label	Albums under Cartel	Description
Rubio & Joel	1999-2000	1	Former hip-hop/reggae duo.
Nicky Jam	2002–2003	1	Co-founder of Los Cangris Music Inc., and formerly a member of Los Cangris with Daddy Yankee during 1999-2003.
Guelo Star	2003	—	Artist and backing vocalist of Daddy Yankee.
Tommy Viera	2004-2006	-	Reggaeton artist.
Los Jedis	2004-2006	-	Trio composed of producers Alex Monserrate, Shimmy, & DJ Urba.
Miguelito	2006-2008	-	Reggaeton artist.
Falo	2007-2009	-	Radio personality and reggaeton artist. Previously shared a rivalry with Daddy Yankee.
Gerry Capó	2010	1	Latin R&B artist and composer.
Carnal	2010-2014		Reggaeton artist.
Pinto Picasso	2014-2018	0	Reggaeton artist who had several singles released under the label. First appeared in Imperio Nazza Top Secret.

== Albums ==
Artist	Album	Details
Daddy Yankee	El Cartel: Los Intocables	Released: August 26, 1997; El Cartel & Guatauba Produccion's; The first produccion's of El Cartel
Rubio & Joel	Gritos De Guerra	Released: 2000; El Cartel & Guatauba Produccion's; Album debut of Rubio & Jeol
Daddy Yankee	El Cartel II: Los Cangris	Released: March 15, 2001; El Cartel Produccion's, Picol Enterprises And Pina Records
Daddy Yankee	El Cangri.com	Released: June 20, 2002; Los Cangris Music Inc. & VI Music.; RIAA certification: Gold
Nicky Jam	Salón de La Fama	Released: July 1, 2003; Los Cangris Music Inc. and White Lion Records.; The hit's of Nicky Jam album.
Daddy Yankee	Los Homerun-Es De Yankee, Vol. 1	Released: August 2003; Los Cangris Music Inc. and VI Music.; The hit's underground of Daddy Yankee during 90's.
Daddy Yankee	Barrio Fino	Released: July 13, 2004; El Cartel Records, VI Music and UMG; RIAA certification: Multi-Platinum, Latin Grammy Awards winner, more of 1.500.000 copies in the world. The best album of reggaeton music of the history.
Daddy Yankee	Barrio Fino en Directo	Released: December 13, 2005; El Cartel Records, Interscope Records and UMG; CD-DVD disc
Daddy Yankee	Tormenta Tropical, Vol. 1	Released: 2006; El Cartel Records, Interscope Records and UMG; CD-DVD disc
Miguelito	Más Grande Que Tú	Released: December 19, 2006; El Cartel Records and Machete Music; Album debut of Miguelito.
Miguelito	Más Grande Que Tú Limited Edition	Released: 2007; El Cartel Records and Machete Music.; CD/DVD Ft's DVD with Daddy Yankee, Don Omar, Wisin & Yandel, Héctor el Father, Marco Antonio Solís, etc.
Daddy Yankee	El Cartel III: The Big Boss	Released: June 5, 2007; El Cartel Records, Interscope Records & UMG.; The second best album of the reggaeton music in the story.
Miguelito	El Heredero	Released: December 18, 2007; El Cartel Records and Machete Music.; This album is winner of the Latin Grammy.
Daddy Yankee	Talento de Barrio	Released: August 12, 2008; El Cartel Records and Machete Music.; Is a Soundtrack for the movie Talento de Barrio.
Daddy Yankee	Daddy Yankee Mundial	Released: April 27, 2010; El Cartel Records and Sony Music Latin.; In this album combined many Latin styles of the music.
Daddy Yankee	Daddy Yankee Prestige	Released: September 11, 2012; El Cartel Records, EMI Music and Capitol Latin.; Tactful one of the best album's of the Reggaeton.
Farruko + Los De La Nazza	Farruko Edition	Released: May 24, 2013; El Cartel Records and Nazza Records.; The sixth volume of the series El Imperio Nazza.
Daddy Yankee + Los De La Nazza	King Daddy	Released: October 29, 2013; El Cartel Records.; The seventh volume of the series El Imperio Nazza.

== Mixtapes ==
- 2010: Gerry Capo - Bastardo: Mixtape
- 2011: Carnal + Los De La Nazza - Carnal (The Mixtape)
- 2012: Los De La Nazza - El Imperio Nazza
- 2012: Los De La Nazza - El Imperio Nazza: Gold Edition
- 2012: Gotay + Los De La Nazza - Imperio Nazza: Gotay Edition
- 2012: J Alvarez + Los De La Nazza - Imperio Nazza: J Alvarez Edition
- 2013: Jowell & Randy + Los De La Nazza - Imperio Nazza: Doxis Edition
- 2013: Carnal + Los De La Nazza - Carnal: ReenCarnal
- 2014: Los De La Nazza - Imperio Nazza: Top Secret Edition

== Unreleased ==
- Daddy Yankee - El Disco Duro (El Cartel Records/EMI/Capitol Latin)

== See also ==
- List of record labels
- Machete Music

== Bibliography ==
- "15 Years Ago, Daddy Yankee's Barrio Fino Set The Template For Reggaeton's Big Rise". MTV News. July 18, 2019. Archived from the original on July 18, 2019.
- "Daddy Yankee Ties Record for Most Weeks Atop Billboard Argentina Hot 100". Billboard. May 12, 2019.
- Farrell, David (January 30, 2019). "Daddy Yankee Storms Global Charts With Snow". FYIMusicNews.
- Cepeda, Eduardo (January 3, 2019). "Why Did the Media Declare the Death of Reggaeton in the Late 2000s?". Remezcla.
- A. Corea (July 18, 2019). "Club de fans reconocido por #DaddyYankee y #CartelRecords Listos para asistir a su concierto en SPS". HCH.TV (in Spanish).
- La Descarga (July 13, 2019). "¿Por qué festeja Daddy Yankee?". ADN Cuba (in Spanish).
- "Daddy Yankee y el intérprete de reggae Snow lanzan juntos un sencillo". El Nuevo Día (in Spanish). January 24, 2019.
- Fernandez, Suzette (October 26, 2017). "Ozuna Is Working on a New Project Called 'Trap Cartel': Exclusive". Billboard.
