= Legendaddy (album) =

2022 studio album by Daddy Yankee

Studio album by Daddy Yankee
- Released: March 24, 2022
- Genres: Reggaeton; trap; tropical; dance
- Length: 54:30
- Languages: Spanish; English (Note: The album includes English-language lyrics on the tracks "Legendaddy", "Hot" and "Bombón".)
- Labels: El Cartel; Republic
- Producers: BK; Manuel DH; Jhon El Diver; Eman; Dímelo Flow; G.O.K.B.; JBD; Chris Jedi; Muzik Junkies (Note: DJ Morphius and Muzik Junkies received production credits for the use of their song "Trompeta y Guaracha" (2019) on the track "Hot".); Alex Killer; Luny; Slow Mike; DJ Morphius; Gaby Music; Nekxum; OMB; Play-N-Skillz; Blu Rey; Scott Summers; Tainy; Maki Váez; Wiso; Daddy Yankee

Daddy Yankee chronology
King Daddy (2013)	Legendaddy (2022)	Lamento en Baile (2025)

Singles from Legendaddy
- 1. "Rumbatón" Released: March 24, 2022; 2. "Agua" Released: March 24, 2022; 3. "Bombón" Released: March 24, 2022; 4. "Hot" Released: March 24, 2022; 5. "Remix" Released: March 24, 2022; 6. "X Última Vez" Released: April 6, 2022; 7. "Para Siempre" Released: June 2, 2022; 8. "Pasatiempo" Released: July 28, 2022

Legendaddy (stylized in all caps) is the eighth studio album by Puerto Rican rapper Daddy Yankee, released on March 24, 2022, by El Cartel Records and Republic Records.

Published 10 years after his previous studio album, Legendaddy was originally intended to be Daddy Yankee's last record, as he announced that he would retire from music after the end of his farewell concert tour, La Última Vuelta, in 2023. Nevertheless, he subsequently returned to music, releasing Lamento en Baile in 2025.

Daddy Yankee described its themes as "fight, party, war and romance." Musically, Legendaddy is primarily a reggaeton record that incorporates trap and elements of salsa, bachata, cumbia, dembow and electronic dance music. He co-wrote and co-produced all 19 tracks, for which he recruited producers including Play-N-Skillz, Dímelo Flow, Luny, Tainy, and Chris Jedi. It features collaborations with Bad Bunny, Becky G, El Alfa, Lil Jon, Michael Buffer, Myke Towers, Natti Natasha, Nile Rodgers, Rauw Alejandro, Pitbull, and Sech. The album received mostly positive reviews from music critics, who referred to it as a good send-off for his retirement, although some of its tracks were criticized. It was nominated for a Grammy Award for Best Música Urbana Album, while the single "Agua" garnered him a Latin Grammy Award for Song of the Year nomination.

Eight singles were released from the record, of which the Bad Bunny-featured "X Última Vez" peaked at number 23 on the Billboard Global 200 and within the top 10 in 10 Latin American countries, while "Remix" and "Rumbatón" reached number one in Daddy Yankee's native Puerto Rico; the former was the most-played radio song of the year in the country. Legendaddy became his highest-peaking album in Spain, at number two; the United States, at eight; Switzerland, at 17; and Canada, at 78. It subsequently received a Latin platinum and gold certification in the United States and Spain, respectively. Legendaddy is Daddy Yankee's final studio album in the reggaeton and hip-hop genre and as well as his final album released under El Cartel Records.

== Background ==
Following the release of Daddy Yankee's sixth studio album Prestige (2012) and his mixtape King Daddy (2013), it was announced in 2014 that his next project would be King Daddy II, which was later renamed El Disco Duro and scheduled to release in 2016. On October 26, 2016, he showed some of the album's tracks to Zumba creator Beto Pérez, with whom he had a partnership, and announced that it would be released during early 2017. On June 21, 2017, when asked about the record, he stated that the release had been postponed due to standalone singles being more profitable. In 2019, Vice contributor Gary Suarez opined that it was "either completely dead in the water or overdue for a radical revision from what he originally intended," while Ulises Fuente of La Razón anticipated that it might not be released because of the success of his standalone singles. In February 2020, Puerto Rican urban music news media Rapetón reported that Daddy Yankee's manager and label Pina Records' CEO, Raphy Pina, stated in a now-deleted post that "people [were] waiting for something that was never made".

On September 10, 2020, Daddy Yankee closed a global distribution deal with Universal Music Group with plans of releasing a new album and producing a documentary about the history of reggaeton. He had his music distributed by Universal through Capitol Latin since 2012 and proposed the recording of a new album due to him owing the label several singles. On September 15, 2021, Billboard's Leila Cobo stated that the then-unnamed album would release in the fall, while Daddy Yankee hinted at a retirement and said that he saw himself growing as an executive producer of movies and documentaries. On September 23, 2021, during his acceptance speech for his induction into the Billboard Latin Music Hall of Fame, Daddy Yankee told his fans to "enjoy his last musical round". Following that, on December 30, 2021, he posted that he was going to "give his last round to the world" in 2022.

On March 20, 2022, he posted a video on his social media in which he announced that he would retire from music after the conclusion of his upcoming farewell concert tour, La Última Vuelta, as well as the release date for his final album, Legendaddy. In the video, the rapper said that he "finally [saw] the finish line" and that he would "give [his fans] all the styles that have defined [him] in one single album," which he referred to as "his best production". The announcement was made on the 27th anniversary of Daddy Yankee's and his wife Mireddys Gonzalez's marriage; the latter posted that "[he] had enjoyed Daddy Yankee for a long time, but now is Raymond Ayala's turn to enjoy what he has built." The album's track list was posted on March 22, 2022, while the guest features were revealed a few hours before the release.

Daddy Yankee decided to retire in 2020 while working on the album during the COVID-19 pandemic and after realizing that he was "feeling good, pleased and accomplished" and that he had to "give himself the opportunity to enjoy everything he had achieved" after working non-stop for 32 years. He always wanted to retire young and felt that the time had come to "look for something beyond the industry" and to be a "normal person". He decided to feature a track list consisting entirely of new songs, without including previously released singles from past years, stating that "it would make an impression because it's something that isn't done anymore." He said that he will have music as a hobby, like he used to when young, and that he sees himself "owning more teams, producing content for movies, documentaries and series [and] producing new music acts." In February 2023, Daddy Yankee announced an "extension" for the album with pre-recorded bonus tracks, including "Chispa", which was selected as the 2023 World Baseball Classic anthem.

== Composition ==
"Rumbatón"
Excerpt of the album's lead single, "Rumbatón", a "bachata-infused reggaeton" track reminiscent of his own "Lo Que Pasó, Pasó" (2004) and the genre's tropical fusions of the 2000s, an era that he wanted to revive.

"Agua"
"Agua", a 1980s-inspired song featuring vocals by Rauw Alejandro and funk guitar riffs by Nile Rodgers. It was particularly praised by critics as refreshing, surprising and exciting, as well as for taking Daddy Yankee "out of his comfort zone". It was nominated for a Latin Grammy Award for Song of the Year.

Daddy Yankee described the album's themes as "fight, party, war and romance," while The New York Times also added "self-mythologizing". Primarily a reggaeton record, both old-school and contemporary, Legendaddy also incorporates trap and elements of salsa, bachata, cumbia, dembow and electronic dance music. Daddy Yankee co-wrote all lyrics with each track's respective guest features and producers. Puerto Rican urban acts Pusho and Justin Quiles co-wrote four and two songs, respectively. The 48-second intro is voiced by American ring announcer Michael Buffer, who presents Daddy Yankee as a "heavyweight champion with an undefeated record of 32 years". It is followed by "Campeón", an "electro-tinted reggaeton" track in which the rapper summarizes his trajectory, describes himself as a legend and expresses that he can retire as an unbeaten champion. He wrote it thinking about his childhood in poverty and the children that now are in the same situation he lived through. He wanted listeners to "identify with him because every human being has a champion inside and the time will come in which they will be able to get it out."

"Remix" is a reggaeton song about exalting the attributes of women with breast and butt implants—an allegory to remix versions being better than the originals—and includes a sample of the chorus from his single "Impacto" (2007). "Pasatiempo" features Puerto Rican rapper Myke Towers and blends reggaeton with a repeating sample of the melody of Swedish producer StoneBridge's remix version of the house single "Show Me Love" (1992) by American singer Robin S., with lyrics about casual sex and a woman who wants to have fun at a nightclub and "take out the beast" she has inside. The following track, "Rumbatón", referred to by Daddy Yankee as the album's flagship, is a "bachata-infused reggaeton" reminiscent of his single "Lo Que Pasó, Pasó" (2004), with Puerto Rican producer Eliel on piano and American musician and former member of Aventura Lenny Santos on guitar. The song takes its chorus from "Báilame" (2006), written by Puerto Rican lyricist and rapper Wise and performed by compatriot duo Trébol Clan. Daddy Yankee had never heard "Báilame" until it was shown to him by Dominican producer Luny and decided to use the chorus in order to reminisce and give the song a retro sound.

"X Última Vez" features Puerto Rican rapper Bad Bunny and is a "sad and nostalgic" song that blends "old-school reggaeton beats with edgy urban sounds," with lyrics about "wanting to rekindle old flames" one last time and "finally saying goodbye to a relationship." The title has a double meaning by also referring to the last time they will collaborate. Bad Bunny references Daddy Yankee's "Donde Hubo Fuego" (2004) by interpolating its chorus during his verse. "Para Siempre" is a "romantic mid-tempo reggaeton" that features Panamanian singer Sech, who provides "R&B vibes," and is about a marriage proposal and finding the "right partner". Daddy Yankee identifies a lot with the track because of his relationship with his wife, to whom he dedicated lines about being together since poverty and the value of her companionship. In "Uno Quitao' y Otro Puesto", he boasts about his career, rapping about his beginnings, his "rise to the top," his invincibility against time and the "zero intimidation" he feels from his enemies. The song uses an "old-school" reggaeton beat, a "heavy bass" and gunshot sounds.

"Truquito" is a 26-second skit featuring a 1993 recording from late American salsa singer Frankie Ruiz that serves as a prelude to the following track, "El Abusador del Abusador", an uplifting reggaeton and salsa fusion with lyrics about being humble while also knowing one's worth. "Enchuletiao'" is a trap song in which he talks about "his unrivaled eminence in the genre". The next song, "Agua", is a "1980s-inspired dance" track that features vocals by Puerto Rican singer Rauw Alejandro and electric guitar funk riffs by American guitarist and producer Nile Rodgers. "Zona del Perreo" is a contemporary reggaeton song that features Dominican singer Natti Natasha and American singer Becky G. "Hot" features Cuban-American rapper Pitbull and is an "EDM fusion" that uses the beat from "Trompeta y Guaracha" (2019) by Mexican disc jockey DJ Morphius and American production duo Muzik Junkies. "La Ola" is an "old-school infectious perreo" with flirtatious and repetitive lyrics about joining a party. "Bombón" is a dembow track that features Dominican rapper El Alfa and American crunk act Lil Jon. "El Rey de lo Imperfecto" is a romantic "urban-infused cumbia song" about an imperfect man "promising to unconditionally love a person through her own insecurities and drama." It is followed by "Impares", a heartbreak song with a "heavy reggaeton beat" about an incompatible couple. The album closes with "Bloke", a reggaeton track that is heavily inspired by Daddy Yankee's 1990s songs and ends with him bidding farewell to his fans.

== Production ==
Daddy Yankee co-produced and programmed all tracks; some of his work include the beat of "Remix", the melodies of "Uno Quitao' y Otro Puesto" and "Campeón", as well as the drumline of the latter, and the synthesized trumpets and bass of "El Abusador del Abusador". American production duo Play-N-Skillz, producers of Daddy Yankee's "Con Calma" (2019), worked on six tracks, including the singles "Agua", "Hot", "Bombón" and "Pasatiempo". They felt "grateful" for being "part of [his] last footprint in music" and referred to the album as "one of [their] favorite projects" they have ever worked on. Puerto Rican El Cartel Records' producers JBD, OMB and Nekxum produced eight, seven and five tracks, respectively.

Mexican producer Scott Summers worked on four songs, while Panamanian producer Dímelo Flow and Colombian group ChocQuibTown member Slow Mike produced three together, including the single "Para Siempre". Dominican producer and longtime collaborator Luny—one half of production duo Luny Tunes, who worked on Daddy Yankee's breakthrough album Barrio Fino (2004) and its single "Gasolina"―produced two tracks, including "Rumbatón". Puerto Rican producer and Grammy Record of the Year-nominee Tainy produced the single "X Última Vez"; he thanked Daddy Yankee for inspiring him and wrote that "being in [his] last album is incredible for a kid who grew up listening to [him]."

Other producers include Puerto Ricans Chris Jedi and Gaby Music on "Zona del Perreo" and Wiso Rivera on "El Abusador del Abusador", Dominican Blu Rey on "Bloke", Puerto Rican Alex Killer, American G.O.K.B. and Colombian Maki Váez on "Enchuletiao'", and Panamanian BK on "La Ola" and "Para Siempre"; the latter was also co-produced by compatriot Jhon El Diver. Mexican disc jockey DJ Morphius and American production duo Muzik Junkies received credit for the use of their song "Trompeta y Guaracha" (2019) on "Hot". All producers were also credited as programmers. Gaby Music, who produced several singles for Daddy Yankee and was one of the recording engineers of "Despacito" (2017), posted that it was a "privilege to have worked with one of the artists that motivated [him] to make music."

The album was recorded in Puerto Rico and Miami by OMB, Dímelo Flow, Gaby Music, Luny, Play-N-Skillz, Puerto Rican producer La Paciencia, American-Nigerian producer Emmanuel "Eman" Anene and American audio engineer Kellie McGrew. It was mixed by OMB, Luny, Play-N-Skillz, Blu Rey, Tainy and American audio engineers Vinny DeLeón and Latin Grammy Record of the Year-winner Luis Barrera Jr.; the latter also provided immersive mixing for nine tracks. It was mastered by American engineer Michael Fuller at Fullersound in Fort Lauderdale, Florida.

== Album cover ==
The cover art was designed by Puerto Rican graphic design company Altoons Design, with creative direction by Alexis Hernández, who works for Daddy Yankee and his manager Raphy Pina's label Pina Records since 2015. It depicts the head of a mature, aged, wounded and bloodstained goat with golden horns, which has been interpreted as Daddy Yankee's experience and his "royalty, wealth, or high social status," as well as a "resistance symbol". The term "GOAT" is also an acronym for the expression "Greatest of All Time", which is frequently used by him. He conceived "Legendaddy"—a combination of "legend" and "Daddy"—after noticing production company Legendary Entertainment's name while watching a film. He wanted to use "Legendaddy" as the name of his own museum, which opened temporarily in Puerto Rico in 2019, because it has the same pronunciation as "legendary" in English, but Raphy Pina convinced him to use it as the album's title instead.

== Release ==
Legendaddy was released digitally on March 24, 2022, on CD on September 26, 2022, and on vinyl on January 6, 2023, through Daddy Yankee's own label El Cartel Records and Universal Music Group's Republic Records. In the United States, the record debuted at number eight on the Billboard 200 in the week ending April 9, 2022, with 29,000 album-equivalent units, calculated from 38.49 million on-demand streams and 2,000 pure sales. It was the highest-peaking, largest-debuting and first top 10 Latin album on the chart since Bad Bunny's El Último Tour del Mundo on the issue dated December 12, 2020. It is Daddy Yankee's highest-charting album in the country and his second top 10 after El Cartel: The Big Boss (2007), although it left the chart after six weeks, becoming his fifth longest-running entry on the Billboard 200. It also became his seventh number one on the US Top Latin Albums chart, where it spent one week at the top position and 47 in total. It subsequently received a Latin platinum certification by the Recording Industry Association of America (RIAA) for units of over 60,000 sales plus equivalent units, the mid-year's highest for a Latin album released within the first half of 2022. It was the 19th best-performing Latin album of 2022 in the United States. An extended version of the album, titled Legendaddy Goat Edition, is set to be released in 2023.

In Spain, Legendaddy debuted and peaked at number two on the issue dated March 31, 2022, and charted for 48 total weeks, becoming his highest-peaking and longest-running album in the country. Writing for Spanish music website Jenesaispop, Sebas Alonso opined that its debut placement in Spain was affected by its lack of a physical release, although it later received a vinyl edition, which peaked at number 21 on the Vinyl Albums chart on January 19, 2023. It was the 19th best-performing record of the year in Spain and received a gold certification for over 20,000 album-equivalent units. It became his highest-ranking record in Switzerland as well after debuting at number 17 in the week ending April 3, 2022, although it only spent two weeks on the chart, lower than Barrio Fino's 22. It also reached number 77 in Italy and 78 in Canada, becoming his first album to enter the latter list, and charted for one week in both countries on the issues dated March 31 and April 9, 2022, respectively. Its songs have amassed a total of over one billion worldwide streams as of July 12, 2022.

=== Singles ===
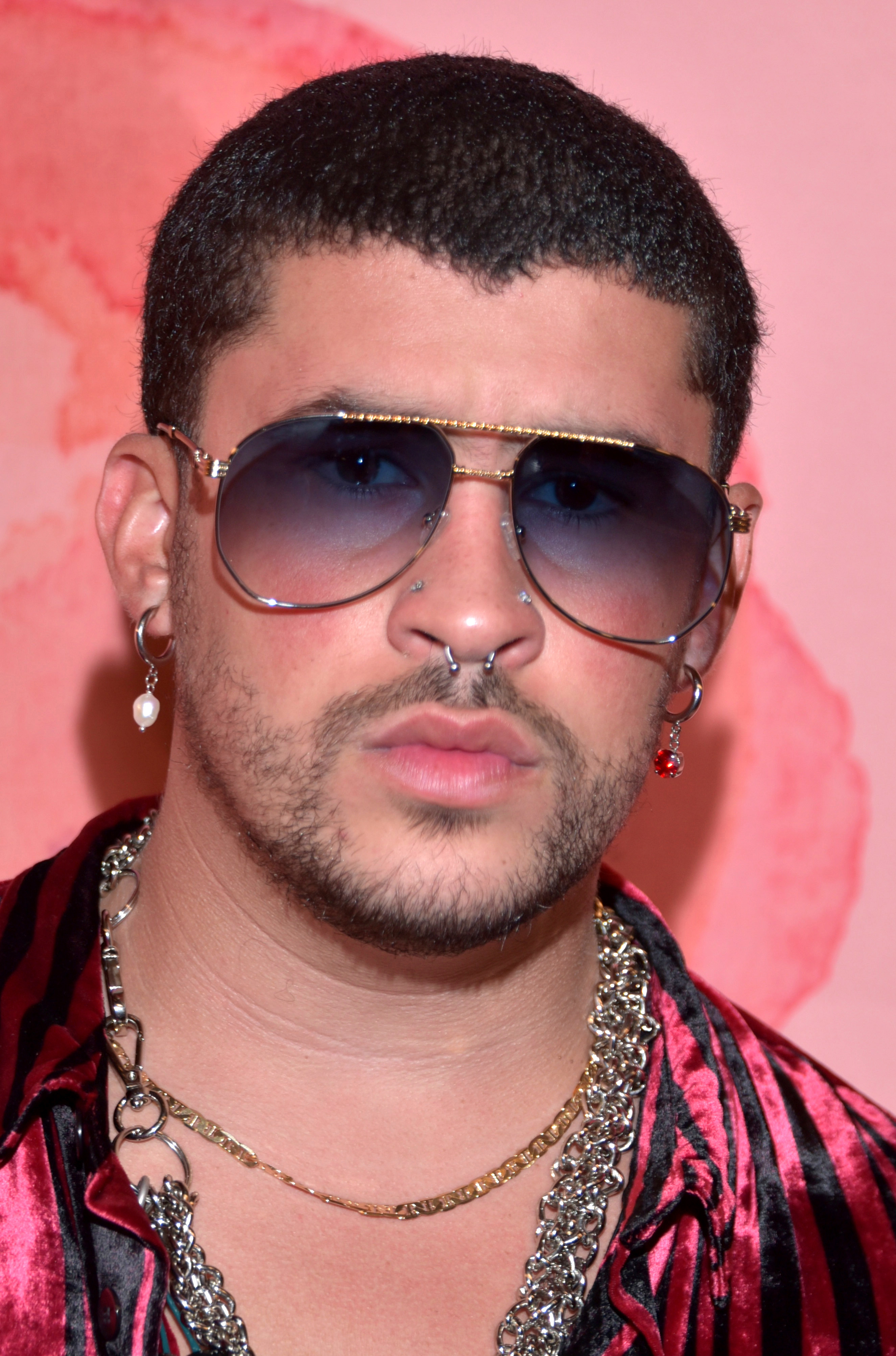
The Bad Bunny-featured (pictured) "X Última Vez" was the album's best performing track of 2022 in three countries.

"Rumbatón", referred to by Daddy Yankee as "the album's flagship", was released as a single simultaneously with Legendaddy on March 24, 2022. It was accompanied by a music video directed by Dominican filmmaker Marlon Peña, which depicts a newlywed couple that end up joining a street party in Cabo Rojo and features cameos by Luny, DJ Joe and Trébol Clan member Periquito. It peaked at number 82 on the Billboard Global 200 and number one in Puerto Rico and Mexico for three and one weeks, respectively, and reached the top five in El Salvador, Honduras and Uruguay and the top 10 in Chile, Ecuador and Peru. It is the album's highest-peaking song in Spain, reaching number 11 and eventually receiving a platinum certification for units of over 60,000 track-equivalent streams. It was the 89th song with most radio spins of 2022 in Latin America, with 95,520, and was the album's most-played track of the year in Bolivia, Chile, Costa Rica, Ecuador, El Salvador, Panama, Peru, Spain, Uruguay, and Venezuela.

"Remix" was also released as a single on March 24, 2022, alongside a music video directed by Venezuelan director Daniel Durán. It peaked at number 147 on the Billboard Global 200 and number one in Puerto Rico and Monitor Latino's Mexico for four and two weeks, respectively, as well as the top five in Honduras. In the United States, it reached number one on the Billboard Latin Airplay, ranked within the top 20 on its Hot Latin Songs and Bubbling Under Hot 100 charts and received a Latin platinum certification for units of over 60,000 track-equivalent streams. It was the 70th best-performing single of 2022 on Billboard's Hot Latin Songs year-end chart and the 10th on its Latin Airplay list. It was the most-played radio song of the year in Puerto Rico, with 5,600 spins, and the 57th in Latin America, with 113,350. It was also the album's best-performing track of the year in Honduras and Mexico.

"Agua" was released as a single alongside the album as well, with a music video directed by Marlon Peña. It peaked at number 189 on the Billboard Global Excl. US chart and reached the top 20 in Panama and the top 30 on the US Hot Latin Songs. The single "Bombón" was accompanied by a music video directed by Daniel Durán, which also premiered with Legendaddy's release. It became a TikTok trend and reached the top five in Nicaragua, the top 10 in El Salvador and the top 20 in the Dominican Republic and Honduras. It was the seventh most-played song of the year in Nicaragua, with 4,220 spins. "Hot" was also concurrently released as a single, with a music video directed by Durán. It reached the top 20 in Honduras, the top 25 on the US Hot Latin Songs and the top 40 on the US Rhythmic chart. It was the album's best-selling track of 2022 in the United States, ranking at number 25 on the Latin Digital Songs year-end chart.

"X Última Vez" was released as the sixth single on April 6, 2022, through a music video shot in New York City and directed by Mexican director Fernando Lugo, which depicts futuristic and dystopian visuals and a "video game-like setting." It peaked at number 23 on the Billboard Global 200 and reached the top five in Bolivia, Chile, the Dominican Republic, Honduras and Mexico and the top 10 in Colombia, Costa Rica, Ecuador, Peru and Puerto Rico. It was the only song from the album to enter the US Billboard Hot 100, peaking at number 73 and later receiving a triple Latin platinum certification for units of over 180,000 track-equivalent streams. It was certified gold in Spain, where it reached the top 20, for units of over 30,000 track-equivalent streams. It was the 44th best-performing single of 2022 on Billboard's Hot Latin Songs year-end chart and ranked among the 40 most-played radio songs of the year in Honduras, Paraguay, and Puerto Rico.

"Para Siempre" was released as the album's seventh single on June 2, 2022, with a music video by Colombian-based director Juan "Jasz" Suárez. Filmed in Colombia and the Puerto Rican municipality of San Germán, it premiered exclusively on Facebook and depicts a marriage proposal. It ranked within the top 20 in Chile, the top 25 on the US Hot Latin Songs chart and the top 40 in Spain. The eighth single, "Pasatiempo", was released on July 28, 2022, through a music video directed by Miami-based director José Sagaró, which incorporates "vintage elements" and a "black and white minimalistic setting". It reached the top 20 in Chile and El Salvador and the top 30 in Spain and the US Hot Latin Songs chart.

==== Other songs ====
Four other music videos premiered simultaneously with the album's release: "La Ola", directed by Marlon Peña; "Zona del Perreo" and "El Abusador del Abusador", both directed by Fernando Lugo; and "Impares", directed by Nuno Gomes. To avoid the songs being leaked online during the filming of the music videos, dancers used in-ear monitors to listen to the tracks while the public and extras listened to a generic reggaeton drum pattern through speakers. 12 of the album's tracks debuted concurrently on the US Hot Latin Songs chart, including "Zona del Perreo", "Uno Quitao' y Otro Puesto" and "Campeón" in the top 40 and "El Abusador del Abusador" in the top 50. In Spain, "Zona del Perreo" peaked within the top 80 and "Campeón", "El Abusador del Abusador" and "Uno Quitao' y Otro Puesto" within the top 100. Additionally, "El Rey de lo Imperfecto" reached the top 20 in El Salvador, where it was the 48th most-played song of 2022 in the country, with 1,730 spins. Visualizer videos for the tracks "Enchuletiao'" and "Campeón", both filmed during his farewell concert tour and directed by Marlon Peña, were released on November 23, 2022, and December 22, 2022, respectively.

== Touring ==
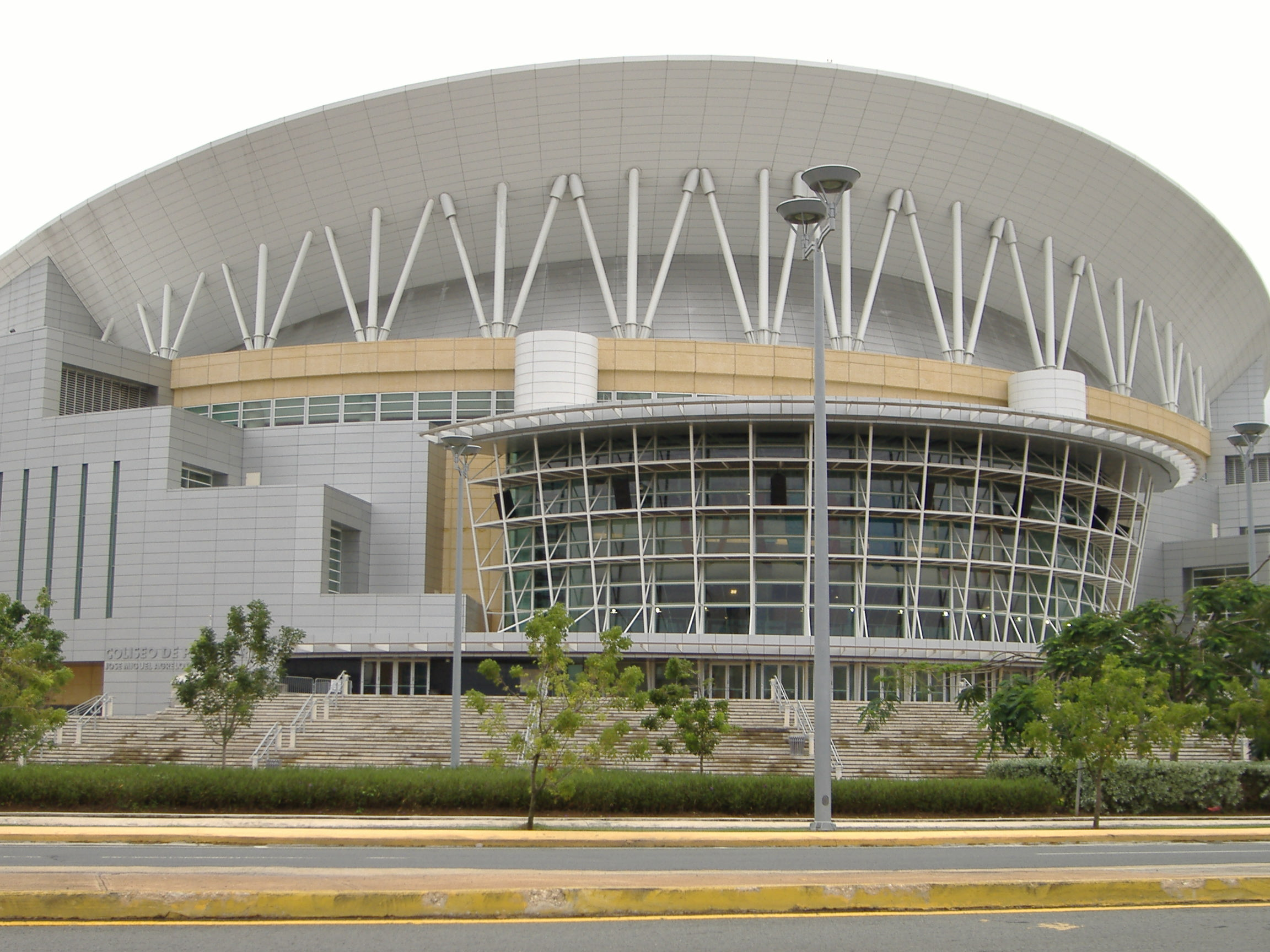
Daddy Yankee performed his final concerts at the José Miguel Agrelot Coliseum.

La Última Vuelta World Tour is Daddy Yankee's final concert tour. Comprising 87 shows, it began in Denver on July 25, 2022, and will conclude in San Juan, Puerto Rico on December 3, 2023. It was originally scheduled to end with three shows from January 6 to 8, 2023, at the Hiram Bithorn Stadium in Puerto Rico but, due to "logistics problems", these were postponed to the end of the year with two additional dates and the venue changed to the José Miguel Agrelot Coliseum.

La Última Vuelta was the sixth highest-grossing tour worldwide of the calendar year of 2022 with a total gross of 197.8 million dollars in ticket sales and 1.9 million attendees across 83 shows, becoming Daddy Yankee's most successful tour and the second highest-grossing Latin tour in Billboard's Boxscore history. His three concerts at the Estadio Nacional Julio Martínez Prádanos in Chile were the 24th highest-grossing boxscore of the year, with a gross of 17.6 million dollars and 196,917 attendees. It also was the year's 21st highest-grossing tour in North America, with a gross of 65 million dollars and 427,981 tickets sold. It was the second most-successful tour of the year in Latin America after grossing 112.7 million dollars and selling 1,383,000 tickets. His five concerts at the Foro Sol in Mexico from November 29 to December 4, 2022, matched Mexican band Grupo Firme's record for the most consecutive shows at the venue. He also became the first artist to sell out three shows in a single day at the Estadio Nacional in Chile after doing so in five hours. It received a Lo Nuestro Award for Tour of the Year at the 35th Lo Nuestro Awards and was nominated for a Pollstar Award for Latin Tour of the Year at the 34th Pollstar Awards and for Tour of the Year at the 8th Latin American Music Awards and the 4th Premios Tu Música Urbano.

== Critical reception ==
Professional ratings
Review scores
Source	Rating
AllMusic	3.5/5 stars
Jenesaispop	4/5 stars
Mondo Sonoro	6/10
Rolling Stone	4/5 stars

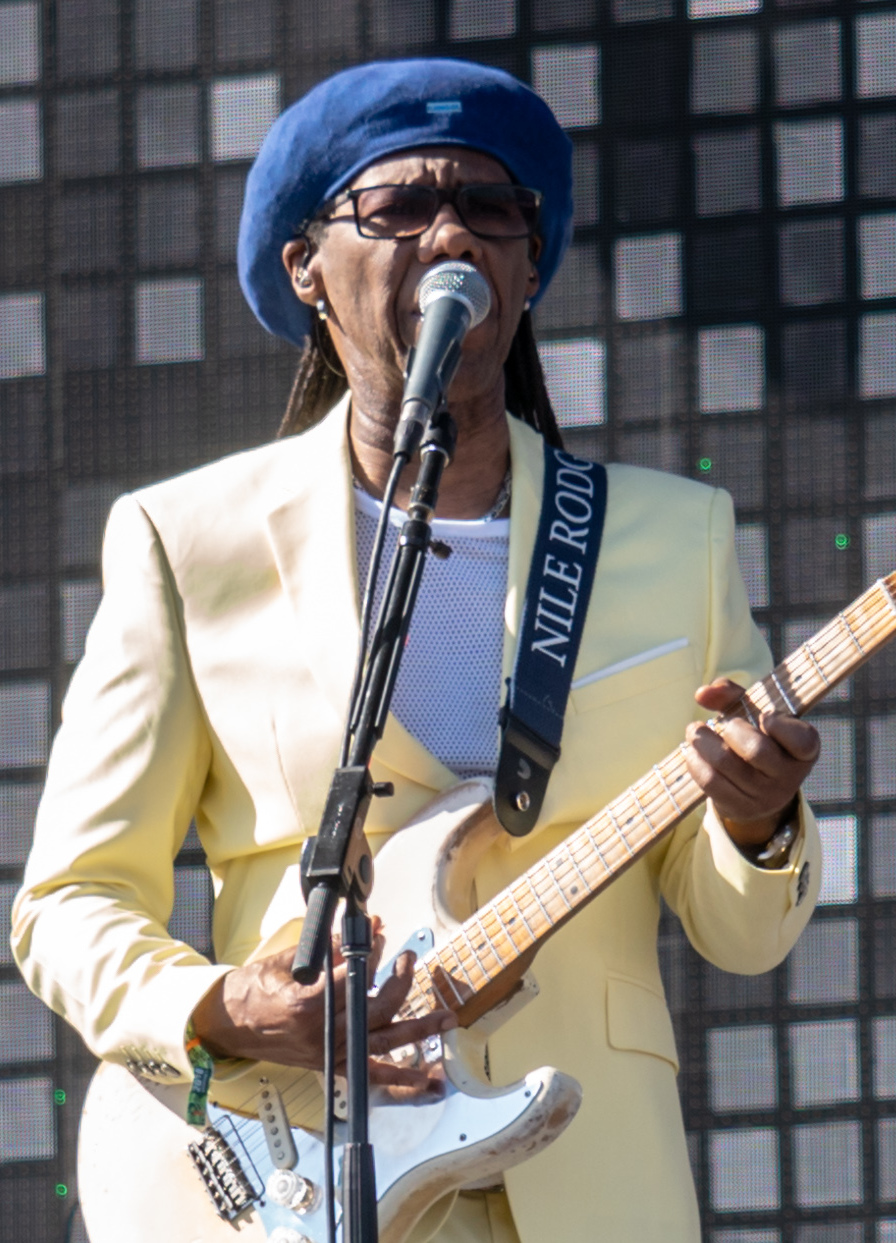
Daddy Yankee crossed an item off his bucket list by working with Nile Rodgers (pictured), who he admired since his childhood, on the praised "Agua". Rodgers was enlisted due to his involvement as producer on several hits from the 1980s.

Legendaddy received mostly positive reviews from music critics, who referred to it as a good send-off for Daddy Yankee's retirement and commended his performance and the album's blend of nostalgic and contemporary reggaeton tracks, as well as its incorporation of other genres.

Describing Legendaddy as Daddy Yankee's best album since Barrio Fino, Gary Suárez of Rolling Stone commended its "forward-looking approach" through contemporary tracks and the choice of a "younger crop of identifiable" vocal collaborators. However, he found the record to have "its flaws, largely reflecting [his] history of making iffy decisions that lead to uneven albums," although he also stated that it is a "blaze of glory" for his retirement, "a Latin icon ending things on his own terms." His delivery and flexibility were praised as sounding "electric [and] deliciously abrasive", as well as "fast, energetic [and] intoxicating," with Isabela Raygoza of the Grammy Awards website commending the album for "[encapsulating] his dynamic and linguistic prowess," with "plenty of moments [...] where [his] creative brilliance shines through." The site's Taila Lee called it "a passionate [...] love letter" and an "emotional swan song".

While Rolling Stone's Gary Suárez commended Legendaddy for its "tacit rejection of nostalgia," Isabelia Herrera of The New York Times stated that "the most dynamic moments come when [Daddy Yankee] reaches for the magic of the past," while Spin's Lucas Villa praised it as an "impressive amalgamation of reggaetón's legacy". "Rumbatón" and "El Abusador del Abusador" were complimented as "nostalgic callbacks to the salsa-reggaeton fusions of the mid-2000s," with the former referred to as a horn-led "return to bachatón". Herrera also praised "Uno Quitao' y Otro Puesto" as a "corrosively effective blast of late-career posturing," "Enchuletiao'" as a "reminder of his technical skills" and "Remix" and "Bloke" as "classic reggaeton romps".

Particular acclaim went towards the single "Agua", which was referred to as a "refreshing moment of adventure" with a "spectacular succession of melodic and rapped hooks", as well as one of the album's "most exciting moments" and "surprising tracks" for "taking Daddy Yankee completely out of his comfort zone." On the other hand, tracks including "Bombón" and "Hot" were heavily criticized as "egregious missteps" and "expendable" for sounding like coming from a long-gone era. Reviewing the album for The New York Times, Isabelia Herrera found a "good portion of the songs" to follow "prosaic, predictable pop formats," describing "Para Siempre" as a "bland, mid-tempo popeton ballad" and "La Ola" and "Zona del Perreo" as sounding like "they were engineered for Spotify's 'Viva Latino' playlist." Nevertheless, fellow critics from AllMusic, Billboard and Remezcla included those tracks among the album's highlights.

The album's collaborations were generally approved, with some of them—including "Pasatiempo" and "X Última Vez"—being selected by critics among its best songs, while Cruz Bonlarron Martínez of American media outlet Latino Rebels noticed the absence of Don Omar, Puerto Rican duo Wisin & Yandel and American singer Nicky Jam, but understood that its guest features "give [it] a more contemporary sound, placing it closer to the new wave reggaeton". On the contrary, Luis Maínez of Spanish magazine Mondo Sonoro criticized the featured artists for "falling short of the opportunity they were given" and wrote that the record lacks the "epic moments" like the ones that helped to improve Daddy Yankee's career.

=== Accolades ===
Legendaddy was ranked as the 24th best overall and 12th best Spanish-language album of 2022 by Rolling Stone, with the magazine describing it as "a final victory lap that captures the magic of his three-decade career," while the single "X Última Vez" was ranked 80th on their best songs of the year ranking. The publication's Spanish-language edition considered it to be one of the year's most important records in Spanish, describing it as a "love letter to the genre". Uproxx contributor Lucas Villa found it to be among the best Latin albums of the year, writing that "reggaeton music's G.O.A.T. didn't let his crown slip," while streaming platform Audiomack's editors included it on their "50 Best Albums of 2022" unranked listicle. Legendaddy was also selected by Univisión as one of the year's best albums, while Milenio ranked it seventh on their top 10 list of 2022. "X Última Vez" was selected by Time as one of the best Latin songs of the year.

It was nominated for a Grammy Award for Best Música Urbana Album at the 65th Grammy Awards, garnering his fifth Grammy nomination and becoming his second album to be nominated at the event. "Agua" was nominated for a Latin Grammy Award for Song of the Year at the 23rd Latin Grammy Awards, while Legendaddy became Daddy Yankee's first album since Barrio Fino to not receive a nomination by the Latin Recording Academy. He received numerous nominations at the 35th Lo Nuestro Awards, with Legendaddy nominated for both Album and Urban Album of the Year categories, while the tracks "Hot" and "Remix" were nominated for Pop Urban/Dance and Urban Song of the Year, respectively. At the 3rd Premios Tu Música Urbano, Legendaddy and "X Última Vez" received the Album of the Year – Male Artist and Top Song – Pop Urban awards, respectively, while "Agua" was nominated for Video of the Year. At the 19th Premios Juventud, Legendaddy and "Bombón" were nominated for Album of the Year and Best Social Dance Challenge, respectively. At the 17th Los 40 Music Awards, the record and "Rumbatón" received nominations for Global Latin – Best Album and Global Latin – Best Video, respectively. Legendaddy was nominated for Album of the Year and Best Urban Album at the ninth Latin American Music Awards, while the singles "Remix" and "Hot" received nominations for Best Urban Song and Best Pop/Urban Collaboration, respectively.

== Track listing ==
Legendaddy track listing
No.	Title	Writer(s)	Producer(s)	Length
1.	"Legendaddy" (Intro; voice by Michael Buffer)	Ramón Ayala	Daddy Yankee; Play-N-Skillz; OMB; JBD; Eman	0:48
2.	"Campeón"	Ayala; Héctor Birriel	Daddy Yankee; Dímelo Flow; Slow Mike; BK	3:14
3.	"Remix"	Ayala; Birriel	Daddy Yankee; Nekxum; OMB; JBD	2:43
4.	"Pasatiempo" (with Myke Towers)	Ayala; Michael Torres; Birriel; Monique Fonseca; Allen George^{[a]}; Fred McFarlane^{[a]}	Daddy Yankee; Play-N-Skillz; JBD	3:24
5.	"Rumbatón"	Ayala; Gabriel Cruz^{[b]}; Gilberto Vélez^{[b]}; Héctor Pagan^{[b]}; Joselly Rosario^{[b]}	Daddy Yankee; Luny; Eliel	4:08
6.	"X Última Vez" (with Bad Bunny)	Ayala; Benito Martínez	Daddy Yankee; Tainy	3:12
7.	"Para Siempre" (with Sech)	Ayala; Carlos Morales; Isaac Ortíz; Ramsés Herrera	Daddy Yankee; Dímelo Flow; Slow Mike; BK; Jhon El Diver	3:30
8.	"Uno Quitao' y Otro Puesto"	Ayala; Birriel	Daddy Yankee; Nekxum; OMB; JBD	3:09
9.	"Truquito" (Skit; voice by Frankie Ruiz)	Ayala; Tyron Hernández	Daddy Yankee; Nekxum; OMB; JBD; Wiso Rivera	0:26
10.	"El Abusador del Abusador"	Ayala; Hernández	Daddy Yankee; Nekxum; OMB; JBD; Wiso Rivera	2:41
11.	"Enchuletiao'"	Ayala; Birriel; Denis Aponte	Daddy Yankee; Alex Killer; G.O.K.B.; Maki Váez	3:09
12.	"Agua" (with Rauw Alejandro and Nile Rodgers)	Ayala; Raúl Ocasio; Birriel; David Fajardo; Emmanuel Anene; Gary Walker; Jorge Pizarro; Rafael Aponte; Raúl Treviño	Daddy Yankee; Play-N-Skillz; Scott Summers	3:24
13.	"Zona del Perreo" (with Natti Natasha and Becky G)	Ayala; Carlos Rivera	Daddy Yankee; Chris Jedi; Gaby Music	3:11
14.	"Hot" (with Pitbull)	Ayala; Armando Pérez; Juan Salinas; Oscar Salinas; Héctor Martínez^{[c]}; Jorge Quintero^{[c]}	Daddy Yankee; Play-N-Skillz; Scott Summers; Muzik Junkies^{[c]}; DJ Morphius^{[c]}	2:34
15.	"La Ola"	Ayala; Herrera; Justin Quiles; Ortíz	Daddy Yankee; Dímelo Flow; Slow Mike; BK	3:11
16.	"Bombón" (with El Alfa and Lil Jon)	Ayala; Emmanuel Herrera; Jonathan Smith; Antonio Romero^{[d]}; Rafael Ruíz^{[d]}	Daddy Yankee; Play-N-Skillz; Scott Summers	3:02
17.	"El Rey de lo Imperfecto"	Ayala; Hernández	Daddy Yankee; Play-N-Skillz; Scott Summers; Eman	2:36
18.	"Impares"	Ayala; Hernández	Daddy Yankee; Nekxum; OMB; JBD	3:15
19.	"Bloke"	Ayala; Birriel; Bobby Dixon^{[e]}; Patrick Thompson^{[e]}; Philip Smart^{[e]}	Daddy Yankee; Luny; Blu Rey; OMB; JBD; Manuel DH	2:44
Total length:				54:30

Sample credits

- ^{^[a]} "Pasatiempo" contains a sample from StoneBridge's remix version of "Show Me Love", written and produced by Allen George and Fred McFarlane, and performed by Robin S.
- ^{^[b]} "Rumbatón" covers the chorus from "Báilame", written by Wise, produced by DJ Joe, and performed by Trébol Clan.
- ^{^[c]} "Hot" samples the beat from "Trompeta y Guaracha", produced by DJ Morphius and Muzik Junkies.
- ^{^[d]} "Bombón" interpolates the chorus from "Macarena", written, produced and performed by Los del Río.
- ^{^[e]} "Bloke" contains a sample from "Hot This Year", produced by Philip Smart and performed by Dirtsman.

== Personnel ==
Credits adapted from Tidal and the album's liner notes.

- Rauw Alejandro – vocals, songwriting (12)
- El Alfa – vocals, songwriting (16)
- Reggi El Auténtico – songwriting (12)
- Luis Barrera Jr. – mixing engineer (4, 10, 12, 14, 16–18), immersive mixing engineer (11–19)
- BCA – songwriting (7, 15)
- Becky G – vocals (13)
- BK – producer, programming (7, 15)
- Michael Buffer – voice (1)
- Bad Bunny – vocals, songwriting (6)
- Trébol Clan – songwriting (5) (Note: Received credit for a cover, an interpolation or the use of a sample.)
- Vinny DeLeón – mixing engineer (2, 7, 11, 15)
- Altoons Design – graphic design
- Manuel DH – producer (19)
- Dirtsman – songwriting (19)
- Jhon El Diver – producer, programming (7)
- Eliel – piano (5)
- Eman – producer (1, 17), recording engineer, songwriting (12)
- Dímelo Flow – producer, recording engineer, programming (2, 7, 15)
- Michael Fuller – mastering engineer
- Allen George – songwriting (4)
- G.O.K.B. – producer, programming (11)
- Tyron Hernandez – songwriting (9–10, 17–18)
- Izaak – songwriting (7, 15)
- JBD – producer, programming (1, 3–4, 8–10, 18–19), songwriting (3–4, 8–10, 18)
- Chris Jedi – producer, programming, songwriting (13)
- DJ Joe – songwriting (5)
- Lil Jon – vocals, songwriting (16)
- Muzik Junkies – producer, programming, songwriting (14)
- Alex Killer – producer, programming (11)
- Nikki Luchese – songwriting (4)
- Luny – producer, recording engineer, mixing engineer (5, 19), programming (19)
- Fred McFarlane – songwriting (4)
- Slow Mike – producer (2, 7, 15), programming (7, 15)
- DJ Morphius – producer, programming, songwriting (14)
- Kellie McGrew – recording engineer (1)
- Gaby Music – producer, programming (13), recording engineer (6, 13, 17), mixing engineer (6, 13)
- Natti Natasha – vocals (13)
- Nekxum – producer, programming (3, 8–10, 18)
- OMB – producer (1, 3, 8–10, 18–19), recording engineer (3–6, 8–11, 13–14, 16, 18–19), mixing engineer (3–4, 8–9, 19), programming (1, 3–4, 8–10, 18–19)
- Omy de Oro – songwriting (11)
- La Paciencia – recording engineer (6)
- Pitbull – vocals, songwriting (14)
- Play-N-Skillz – producer, programming (1, 4, 12, 14, 16–17), recording engineer (4), mixing engineer (1), songwriting (14)
- Pusho – songwriting (3–4, 8, 11, 19)
- Justin Quiles – songwriting (15)
- David Raey – songwriting (12)
- Blu Rey – producer, mixing engineer, programming (19)
- Los del Río – songwriting (16)
- Nile Rodgers – guitar (12)
- Frankie Ruiz – voice (9)
- Rey Santana – songwriting (12)
- Lenny Santos – guitar (5)
- Sech – vocals, songwriting (7)
- Philip Smart – songwriting (19)
- Scott Summers – producer, programming, songwriting (12, 14, 16–17)
- Tainy – producer, mixing engineer, programming (6)
- Myke Towers – vocals, songwriting (4)
- Maki Váez – producer, programming (11)
- Gary Walker – songwriting (12)
- Wise – songwriting (5)
- Wiso Rivera – producer, programming (9, 10)
- Daddy Yankee – vocals (2–8, 10–19), producer, programming, songwriting (all tracks)

== Charts ==
=== Weekly charts ===
Weekly chart performance for Legendaddy
Chart (2022)	Peak position
Canadian Albums (Billboard)	78
Italian Albums (FIMI)	77
Spanish Albums (PROMUSICAE)	2
Swiss Albums (Schweizer Hitparade)	17
US Billboard 200	8
US Top Latin Albums (Billboard)	1
US Latin Rhythm Albums (Billboard)	1

=== Year-end charts ===
Yearly chart performance for Legendaddy
Chart (2022)	Position
Spanish Albums (PROMUSICAE)	19
US Top Latin Albums (Billboard)	19

== Certifications ==
Certifications for Legendaddy
Region	Certification	Certified units/sales
Spain (Promusicae)	Gold	20,000^{‡}
United States (RIAA)	Platinum (Latin)	60,000^{‡}
^{‡} Sales+streaming figures based on certification alone.

== See also ==
- 2022 in Latin music
- List of number-one Billboard Latin Albums from the 2020s
- List of number-one Billboard Latin Rhythm Albums of 2022
