= Mayor Que Usted =

Single by Natti Natasha, Daddy Yankee and Wisin & Yandel
- Language: Spanish
- Released: June 17, 2022
- Genre: Reggaeton; bachata
- Length: 3:54
- Label: Pina; Sony Latin
- Songwriters: Ramón Ayala; Héctor Birriel; Kevin Galván; Natalia Gutiérrez; Luian Malavé; Ovimael Maldonado; Kedin Maysonet; Wander Méndez; Juan Morera; Rafael Pina; Rafael Salcedo; Edgar Semper; Xavier Semper; Llandel Veguilla
- Producers: DJ Luian; Mambo Kingz; Raphy Pina; Wisin

Natti Natasha singles chronology
"Wow BB" (2022)	"Mayor Que Usted" (2022)	"Lokita" (2022)

Daddy Yankee singles chronology
"Para Siempre" (2022)	"Mayor Que Usted" (2022)	"Pasatiempo" (2022)

Wisin & Yandel singles chronology
"Llueve" (2022)	"Mayor Que Usted" (2022)

Music video
- "Mayor Que Usted" on YouTube

"Mayor Que Usted" (English: "Older Than You") is a song by Dominican singer Natti Natasha, Puerto Rican rapper Daddy Yankee and Puerto Rican duo Wisin & Yandel, released on June 17, 2022 under Pina Records and Sony Music Latin. It was written by Natti Natasha, Daddy Yankee, Wisin & Yandel, Puerto Rican producers DJ Luian, Mambo Kingz and Ovimael "OMB" Maldonado, Puerto Rican rapper Pusho, Puerto Rican businessman and Natti Natasha's husband Raphy Pina, Kevin Galván, Kedin Maysonet, Wander Méndez and Rafael Salcedo. It was produced by DJ Luian, Mambo Kingz, Raphy Pina and Wisin.

It is a reggaeton and bachata fusion reminiscent of the single "Mayor Que Yo" (2005), in which Daddy Yankee and Wisin & Yandel participated, blending contemporary sounds with those found on that song, as well as "touches of merengue ripiao". Commercially, it peaked at number one in the Dominican Republic, Mexico and Puerto Rico, at nine in Honduras, at 18 in El Salvador and at 29 on the US Billboard Hot Latin Songs chart.

== Background and composition ==
"Mayor Que Usted" was written by Natti Natasha, Daddy Yankee, Wisin & Yandel, DJ Luian, Mambo Kingz's members Edgar Semper and Xavier Semper, Ovimael "OMB" Maldonado, Pusho, Kevin Galván, Kedin Maysonet, Wander Méndez, Rafael Salcedo and Pina Records' CEO Raphy Pina, who is Daddy Yankee's manager and Natti Natasha's husband. It was produced by DJ Luian, Mambo Kingz, Raphy Pina and Wisin. It was recorded and mixed by DJ Luian and Mambo Kingz, with Santo Niño also serving a recording engineer, and was mastered by Puerto Rican audio engineer Esteban Piñero.

Natti Natasha and Daddy Yankee had previously worked together on singles including "Otra Cosa" (2016), "No Lo Trates" and "Runaway" (both 2019), while she also collaborated with Yandel on his Quien Contra Mí 2 track "Diablo En Mujer" (2020), and is her first song with Wisin and both Wisin & Yandel as duo. It will be the last collaboration between Daddy Yankee and Wisin & Yandel, since the former announced that he will retire after the end of his farewell concert tour, La Última Vuelta, and the latters will disband as duo after their tour La Última Misión. The three of them had also worked together on other singles including "No Me Dejes Solo" (2004), "Mayor Que Yo" (2005), "Noche de Entierro" (2006) and "Si Supieras" (2019).

Natti Natasha felt that she was accomplishing something "nearly impossible" by working with Daddy Yankee and Wisin & Yandel, who she referred to as her "referents" and described collaborating with them as "priceless". She also stated that "in this last stage of their careers, now they are the older ones and I am the younger, in charge of continuing to bring my music to the world." Los Angeles Times reported that the collaboration was achieved before Daddy Yankee's retirement announcement in March 2022.

The song's title, chorus and fusion between reggaeton and bachata are reminiscent of "Mayor Que Yo" (2005) by Puerto Rican singer Tony Tun Tun, Wisin & Yandel, Daddy Yankee and Puerto Rican rappers Héctor el Father and Baby Ranks. It also interpolates Wisin & Yandel's singles "Mírala Bien" (2005) and "Ahora Es" (2007) and Daddy Yankee's Talento de Barrio track "Come y Vete" (2008). The collaboration was first announced on June 14, 2022 by Wisin & Yandel on their social media, who posted that it would be with Daddy Yankee and a to-be-announced artist. Daddy Yankee posted that he "could not leave without this collaboration" and Natti Natasha's involvement was announced the following day. It is a reggaeton song with a duration of three minutes and fifty-four seconds that blends modern sounds with those found in "Mayor Que Yo", as well as "touches of merengue ripiao".

== Commercial performance ==
"Mayor Que Usted" debuted at number 46 on the Billboard Hot Latin Songs on the issue dated July 2, 2022, becoming Natti Natasha's 24th chart entry, Daddy Yankee's 99th and Wisin & Yandel's 49th, eventually peaking at number 29 on September 3, 2022. It also reached number one in the Dominican Republic, Mexico and Puerto Rico, number nine in Honduras and number 18 in El Salvador.

== Live performances ==
Natti Natasha, Daddy Yankee and Wisin & Yandel performed the song live for the first time at the 19th Premios Juventud, held on July 21, 2022 at the José Miguel Agrelot Coliseum in San Juan, Puerto Rico.

== Credits and personnel ==
- Kevin Galván – producer
- DJ Luian – producer, recording engineer, mixing engineer, songwriting
- Kedin Maysonet – songwriting
- Wander Méndez – songwriting
- Natti Natasha – vocals, songwriting
- Santo Niño – recording engineer
- OMB – songwriting
- John Eddie Pérez – A&R director
- Raphy Pina – producer, songwriting
- Esteban Piñero – mastering engineer
- Pusho – songwriting
- Rafael Salcedo – songwriting
- Mambo Kingz – producer, recording engineer, mixing engineer, songwriting
- Mayra del Valle – A&R coordinator
- Wisin – vocals, producer, songwriting
- Yandel – vocals, songwriting
- Daddy Yankee – vocals, songwriting

== Charts ==
Chart (2022)	Peak position
Dominican Republic (Monitor Latino)	1
El Salvador (Monitor Latino)	18
Honduras (Monitor Latino)	9
Mexico (Monitor Latino)	1
Puerto Rico (Monitor Latino)	1
US Hot Latin Songs (Billboard)	29
US Latin Airplay (Billboard)	1

== Certifications ==
Region	Certification	Certified units/sales
Mexico (AMPROFON)	Gold	70,000^{‡}
United States (RIAA)	Platinum (Latin)	60,000^{‡}
^{‡} Sales+streaming figures based on certification alone.
