= Pasatiempo (song) =

Single by Daddy Yankee featuring Myke Towers

from the album Legendaddy
- Language: Spanish
- Released: July 28, 2022
- Genre: Reggaeton
- Length: 3:24
- Label: El Cartel; Universal; Republic
- Songwriters: Ramón Ayala; Ángel Barbosa; Héctor Birriel; Monique Fonseca; Ovimael Maldonado; Juan Salinas; Oscar Salinas; Michael Torres; Allen George (Note: Received songwriting credit for the use of "Show Me Love" by Robin S.); Fred McFarlane
- Producers: Daddy Yankee; Play-N-Skillz; JBD

Daddy Yankee singles chronology
"Mayor Que Usted" (2022)	"Pasatiempo" (2022)	"Ulala (Ohh la la)" (2022)

Myke Towers singles chronology
"Traductor" (2022)	"Pasatiempo" (2022)	"Ande Con Quién Ande" (2022)

Music video
- "Pasatiempo" on YouTube

"Pasatiempo" (English: "Pastime") is a song by Puerto Rican rapper Daddy Yankee featuring compatriot rapper Myke Towers, released as the fifth single from the former's eighth and final studio album, Legendaddy, on July 28, 2022. Its music video was directed by José Sagaró, was shot in Puerto Rico and depicts both artists performing at a house party, around a bonfire and in a "black and white minimalistic setting", incorporating "vintage elements". The song was written by Daddy Yankee, Myke Towers, Puerto Rican rapper Pusho, Monique Fonseca, Puerto Rican producers Ángel "JBD" Barbosa and Ovimael "OMB" Maldonado and American production duo Play-N-Skillz, while American producers and lyricists Allen George and Fred McFarlane received songwriting credits for the use of "Show Me Love" (1990) by American singer Robin S., whose 1992 remix version by Swedish producer StoneBridge is sampled on the track. It was produced by Daddy Yankee, Play-N-Skillz and JBD.

It is a reggaeton song with lyrics about casual sex and a woman who wants to have fun at a nightclub and "take out the beast" she has inside. It received positive comments by music critics and reached number 17 in El Salvador, 19 in Chile and 28 in Spain and the US Billboard Hot Latin Songs chart.

== Background and composition ==
"Pasatiempo" was written by Daddy Yankee, Myke Towers, Ángel "JBD" Barbosa, Monique Fonseca, Ovimael "OMB" Maldonado, Pusho and Play-N-Skillz members Juan Salinas and Oscar Salinas, and was produced by Daddy Yankee, Play-N-Skillz and JBD. The song samples the melody of Swedish producer StoneBridge's remix version of the house single "Show Me Love" (1992) by Robin S., for which lyricists Allen George and the late Fred McFarlane received songwriting credits. It was recorded by Play-N-Skillz and OMB, mixed by American audio engineer Luis Barrera Jr. and OMB, and mastered by American engineer Michael Fuller.

Daddy Yankee and Myke Towers had previously collaborated on the single "Súbele El Volumen" (2021). The latter posted on March 25, 2022 that was remembering when he listened to Daddy Yankee's album Los Homerun-es (2003) for the first time, that he was still assimilating that he was appearing on Legendaddy, thanked him for his advices and inspiration and said to him to enjoy his legacy. "Pasatiempo" is a reggaeton song with a duration of three minutes and twenty-four seconds and lyrics about casual sex and a woman who wants to have fun at a nightclub and "take out the beast" she has inside.

== Reception ==
"Pasatiempo" was selected as the "song of the day" on March 30, 2022 by Spanish music website Jenesaispop, whose editor Jordi Bardají referred to as "irresistible from the first listen" and "a fun fusion of classic reggaeton and nineties sounds that deserves to become a hit". Bardají also included it among the best tracks of Legendaddy. Writing for Spin, Lucas Villa highlighted it as a "dancefloor delight" and a "seamless and magical collision of two very different musical worlds" between its reggaeton beat and its house sample. Rolling Stone's Gary Suárez commended it as a "thumping collab" and described it as Legendaddy's "only truly overt application" of Daddy Yankee's "late-period penchant for borrowing from other artists' universally recognizable hits to build his own," where Play-N-Skillz "cheekily replay the melody" of "Show Me Love".

== Commercial performance ==
Following the release of Daddy Yankee's seventh and final record, Legendaddy, "Pasatiempo" was one of the 12 tracks of the album that simultaneously entered the US Billboard Hot Latin Songs chart on the week ending April 9, 2022, debuting and peaking at number 28. Those same 12 songs also debuted concurrently in Spain on the issue dated March 31, 2022, with "Pasatiempo" as the album's third highest-charting track in the country, peaking at number 28. It also reached number 17 in El Salvador, 19 in Chile and 72 on the Paraguayan monthly top 100.

== Music video ==
The music video for "Pasatiempo" was published on July 28, 2022 and depicts Daddy Yankee and Myke Towers performing the song in a "black and white minimalistic setting," at a house party and around a bonfire. It also incorporates "vintage elements," such a cassette tape, a CTR television and "Kodak polaroid film-inspired post-production work". It was directed by José Emilio Sagaró of Miami-based company Film Heads, who had previously worked with Daddy Yankee on the music video for the remix version of "Tata" (2021) and with Myke Towers on "Las Leyendas Nunca Mueren" and "Jóvenes Millonarios" (both 2021), and was shot in Puerto Rico.

== Live performances ==
"Pasatiempo" was included in the setlist of Daddy Yankee's farewell concert tour, La Última Vuelta, in which Myke Towers appeared on a holographic screen.

== Credits and personnel ==
- Luis Barrera Jr. – mixing engineer
- Monique Fonseca – songwriting
- Michael Fuller – mastering engineer
- Allen George – songwriting
- JBD – producer, programming, songwriting
- Fred McFarlane – songwriting
- OMB – recording engineer, mixing engineer, programming, songwriting
- Play-N-Skillz – producer, recording engineer, programming, songwriting
- Pusho – songwriting
- Myke Towers – vocals, songwriting
- Daddy Yankee – vocals, producer, programming, songwriting

== Charts ==
=== Weekly charts ===
Chart (2022)	Peak position
Chile (Billboard)	19
El Salvador (Monitor Latino)	17
Spain (Promusicae)	28
US Hot Latin Songs (Billboard)	28

=== Monthly charts ===
Chart (2022)	Peak position
Paraguay (SGP)	72
