= Remix (song) =

Single by Daddy Yankee

from the album Legendaddy
- Language: Spanish
- Released: March 24, 2022
- Genre: Reggaeton
- Length: 2:43
- Label: El Cartel; Universal; Republic
- Songwriters: Ramón Ayala; Ángel Barbosa; Héctor Birriel; Ovimael Maldonado; Roberto Figueroa
- Producers: Daddy Yankee; Nekxum; OMB; JBD

Daddy Yankee singles chronology
"Hot" (2022)	"Remix" (2022)	"X Última Vez" (2022)

Music video
- "Remix" on YouTube

"Remix" is a song by Puerto Rican rapper Daddy Yankee from his eighth and final studio album, Legendaddy, both released on March 24, 2022 alongside a music video directed by Venezuelan director Daniel Durán. It was written by Daddy Yankee, Puerto Rican producers Roberto "Nekxum" Figueroa, Ovimael "OMB" Maldonado and Ángel "JBD" Barbosa and Puerto Rican rapper Pusho, and was produced by Daddy Yankee, Nekxum, OMB and JBD.

It is a reggaeton song about exalting the attributes of women with breast and butt implants, an allegory to remix versions being better than the originals. Commercially, "Remix" reached number 147 on the Billboard Global 200, as well as number one in Monitor Latino's Puerto Rico and Mexico and the US Latin Airplay chart, as well as number five in Honduras. It also peaked within the top 40 in Chile and Spain and received a Latin platinum certification in the United States.

== Background and composition ==
"Remix" was written by Daddy Yankee, Roberto "Nekxum" Figueroa, Ovimael "OMB" Maldonado, Ángel "JBD" Barbosa and rapper Pusho, and was produced and programmed by Daddy Yankee, Nekxum, OMB and JBD. It was recorded and mixed by OMB and mastered by American audio engineer Michael Fuller. It is a reggaeton song with a duration of two minutes and forty-three seconds and its lyrics are about exalting the attributes of women with breast and butt implants—an allegory to remix versions being better than the originals—and includes a sample of the chorus from Daddy Yankee's single "Impacto" (2007).

== Commercial performance ==
Following the release of Daddy Yankee's Legendaddy, "Remix" debuted at number 147 on the Billboard Global 200 and charted for one week, becoming the record's third highest-peaking song on the list after "X Última Vez" and "Rumbatón". It was the album's second highest-charting track in the United States, reaching number 13 and 17 on Billboard's Hot Latin Songs and Bubbling Under Hot 100 charts, respectively, as well as number one on Latin Airplay. It received a Latin platinum certification by the Recording Industry Association of America (RIAA) on May 26, 2022 for units of over 60,000 track-equivalent streams. In Spanish-speaking countries, it peaked at number one in Puerto Rico and Monitor Latino's Mexico for three and two weeks, respectively, and reached number five in Honduras. It also peaked at number 13 and 38 in Chile and Spain, respectively, and at number 25 on the Paraguayan monthly top 100.

== Live performances ==
"Remix" was included in the setlist of Daddy Yankee's farewell concert tour, La Última Vuelta.

== Credits and personnel ==
- JBD – producer, programming, songwriting
- Michael Fuller – mastering engineer
- Nekxum – producer, programming, songwriting
- OMB – producer, programming, recording engineer, mixing engineer, songwriting
- Pusho – songwriting
- Daddy Yankee – vocals, producer, programming, songwriting

== Charts ==
=== Weekly charts ===
Chart (2022)	Peak position
Chile (Billboard)	13
El Salvador (Monitor Latino)	17
Global 200 (Billboard)	147
Honduras (Monitor Latino)	5
Mexico Airplay (Monitor Latino)	1
Puerto Rico (Monitor Latino)	1
Spain (Promusicae)	38
US Bubbling Under Hot 100 (Billboard)	17
US Hot Latin Songs (Billboard)	13
US Latin Airplay (Billboard)	1

=== Monthly charts ===
Chart (2022)	Peak position
Paraguay (SGP)	25

=== Year-end charts ===
Chart (2022)	Position
Honduras (Monitor Latino)	11
Latin America (Monitor Latino)	57
Mexico (Monitor Latino)	65
Nicaragua (Monitor Latino)	84
Paraguay (Monitor Latino)	99
Puerto Rico (Monitor Latino)	1
US Hot Latin Songs (Billboard)	70
US Latin Airplay (Billboard)	10

== Certifications ==
Region	Certification	Certified units/sales
United States (RIAA)	Platinum (Latin)	60,000^{‡}
^{‡} Sales+streaming figures based on certification alone.

== See also ==
- List of Billboard Hot Latin Songs and Latin Airplay number ones of 2022
