= Hot (Daddy Yankee song) =

Single by Daddy Yankee featuring Pitbull

from the album Legendaddy
- Language: Spanish; English
- Released: March 24, 2022
- Genre: EDM
- Length: 2:34
- Label: El Cartel; Universal; Republic
- Songwriters: Ramón Ayala; David Macías; Ovimael Maldonado; Armando Pérez; Juan Salinas; Oscar Salinas; Héctor Martínez (Note: Received production and songwriting credits for the use of their song "Trompeta y Guaracha".); Jorge Quintero
- Producers: Daddy Yankee; Play-N-Skillz; Scott Summers; Muzik Junkies; DJ Morphius

Daddy Yankee singles chronology
"Bombón" (2022)	"Hot" (2022)	"Remix" (2022)

Pitbull singles chronology
"Discoteca" (2021)	"Hot" (2022)	"Can't Stop Us Now" (2022)

Music video
- "Hot" on YouTube

"Hot" is a song by Puerto Rican rapper Daddy Yankee with Cuban-American rapper Pitbull. It was released on March 24, 2022, simultaneously with Daddy Yankee's eighth and final studio album, Legendaddy, among various other singles from the record. It was accompanied by a music video directed by Venezuelan director Daniel Durán. It was written by Daddy Yankee, Pitbull, Mexican producer David "Scott Summers" Macías, Puerto Rican producer Ovimael "OMB" Maldonado and American production duo Play-N-Skillz members Juan Salinas and Oscar Salinas. It was produced by Daddy Yankee, Play-N-Skillz and Scott Summers. Mexican disc jockey DJ Morphius and American production duo Muzik Junkies received production and songwriting credits for the use of the beat of their song "Trompeta y Guaracha" (2019).

"Hot" has been described as an "EDM fusion" and received mostly negative reviews from music critics. Commercially, it reached number 15 in Honduras, 23 on the US Hot Latin Songs chart, 32 on the US Rhythmic chart and 61 in Spain.

== Background and composition ==
"Bombón" was written by Daddy Yankee, Pitbull, David "Scott Summers" Macías, Ovimael "OMB" Maldonado and Play-N-Skillz members Juan Salinas and Oscar Salinas, and was produced and programmed by Daddy Yankee, Play-N-Skillz and Scott Summers. It was mixed and mastered by American audio engineers Luis Barrera Jr. and Michael Fuller, respectively; the former also provided immersive mixing. DJ Morphius and American production duo Muzik Junkies received production, programming and songwriting credits for the use of the beat of their song "Trompeta y Guaracha" (2019). Daddy Yankee and Pitbull had previously worked on the remix versions of "Gasolina" and "What U Gon' Do" (both 2004) and "No Lo Trates" (2019). "Hot" has been described as an "EDM fusion" and has a duration of two minutes and thirty-four seconds.

Upon release, fans of Mexican drag queen Stupidrag accused Daddy Yankee of plagiarizing the beat of her song "Suertuda" (2020), which also samples "Trompeta y Guaracha", on social media. DJ Morphius, producer of "Trompeta y Guaracha", clarified that he had sold the track's copyright to Daddy Yankee, while Stupidrag had to remove "Suertuda" from streaming platforms for having used the beat without authorization.

== Reception ==
Remezcla's Jeanette Hernandez selected it among Legendaddy's best tracks, "highlighting [Pitbull's] signature sound" with "the club banger anthem vibe that [he] is known for". On the other hand, Rolling Stone's Gary Suárez criticized it as "a challenging listen [...] that skews a bit too close to the stagnant Mr. Worldwide brand." Isabelia Herrera of The New York Times referred to it as an "egregious misstep" and described it as "essentially a caricature of Miami nightclub fare." Jordi Bardají of Spanish music website Jenesaispop considered it "expendable" and described it as a song that "sounds like something out of 2010".

== Commercial performance ==
Following the release of Daddy Yankee's seventh and final record, Legendaddy, "Hot" debuted and peaked at number 23 on Billboard's Hot Latin Songs chart and at 61 in Spain. In the United States, it also eventually reached number five on the Billboard Latin Digital Song Sales chart, the highest for the album, 25 on Latin Airplay and 32 on the Rhythmic chart. It also reached number 15 in Honduras.

== Credits and personnel ==
- Luis Barrera Jr. – mixing engineer, immersive mixing engineer
- Michael Fuller – mastering engineer
- Muzik Junkies – producer, programming, songwriting
- DJ Morphius – producer, programming, songwriting
- OMB – recording engineer, songwriting
- Pitbull – vocals, songwriting
- Play-N-Skillz – producer, programming, songwriting
- Scott Summers – producer, programming, songwriting
- Daddy Yankee – vocals, producer, programming, songwriting

== Charts ==
=== Weekly charts ===
Chart (2022)	Peak position
Honduras (Monitor Latino)	15
Spain (PROMUSICAE)	61
US Hot Latin Songs (Billboard)	23
US Latin Airplay (Billboard)	25
US Rhythmic Airplay (Billboard)	32

=== Year-end charts ===
Chart (2022)	Position
El Salvador (Monitor Latino)	63
Honduras (Monitor Latino)	53
Nicaragua (Monitor Latino)	97
US Latin Digital Song Sales (Billboard)	25
US Latin Rhythm Airplay (Billboard)	49
