= Agua (Daddy Yankee song) =

Single by Daddy Yankee featuring Rauw Alejandro and Nile Rodgers

from the album Legendaddy
- Language: Spanish
- Released: March 24, 2022
- Recorded: Late 2021
- Studio: 5020 Studio (Miami)
- Genre: Dance; disco; pop; trap
- Length: 3:24
- Label: El Cartel; Universal; Republic
- Songwriters: David Fajardo; David Macías; Emmanuel Anene; Nile Rodgers; Gary Walker; Juan Salinas; Oscar Salinas; Rafael Aponte; Ramón Ayala; Raúl Ocasio; Raúl Treviño
- Producers: Daddy Yankee; Play-N-Skillz; Scott Summers

Daddy Yankee singles chronology
"Rumbatón" (2022)	"Agua" (2022)	"Bombón" (2022)

Rauw Alejandro singles chronology
"Gracias Por Nada" (2022)	"Agua" (2022)	"Te Felicito" (2022)

Nile Rodgers singles chronology
"Up All Night" (2021)	"Agua" (2022)	"I Was Made For Lovin' You" (2022)

Music video
- "Agua" on YouTube

"Agua" (English: "Water") is a song by Puerto Rican rapper Daddy Yankee featuring Puerto Rican singer Rauw Alejandro on vocals and American musician and producer Nile Rodgers on guitar, being their first collaboration with each other. It was released on March 24, 2022 simultaneously with Daddy Yankee's eighth and final studio album, Legendaddy, among various other singles from the record. It was accompanied by a music video directed by Dominican filmmaker Marlon Peña. It was written by Daddy Yankee, Rauw Alejandro, Nile Rodgers, American-Colombian singer David "Raey" Fajardo, Venezuelan singer Rafael "Reggi El Auténtico" Aponte, American singer Raúl "Rey Santana" Treviño, Gary Walker, Mexican producer Scott Summers, American-Nigerian producer Emmanuel Anene and American production duo Play-N-Skillz members Juan Salinas and Oscar Salinas. It was produced by Daddy Yankee, Play-N-Skillz and Scott Summers.

It is a dance, disco and pop song with a trap segment, funk electric guitar riffs and love lyrics. Daddy Yankee wanted to record a 1980s-inspired track and enlisted Rauw Alejandro due to the success of his single "Todo de Ti" (2021) and Nile Rodgers because of his involvement as producer and guitarist of several hits from that era. It has been praised by music critics as one of the album's best tracks—referred to as surprising, refreshing, alluring, irresistible and exciting—and was nominated for Song of the Year at the 23rd Latin Grammy Awards. Commercially, it reached number 189 on Billboard's Global Excl. US chart, as well as number 12 in Panama, number 21 on the US Hot Latin Songs, number 28 on Billboard's Mexico Español Airplay chart and number 52 in Spain.

== Background and composition ==
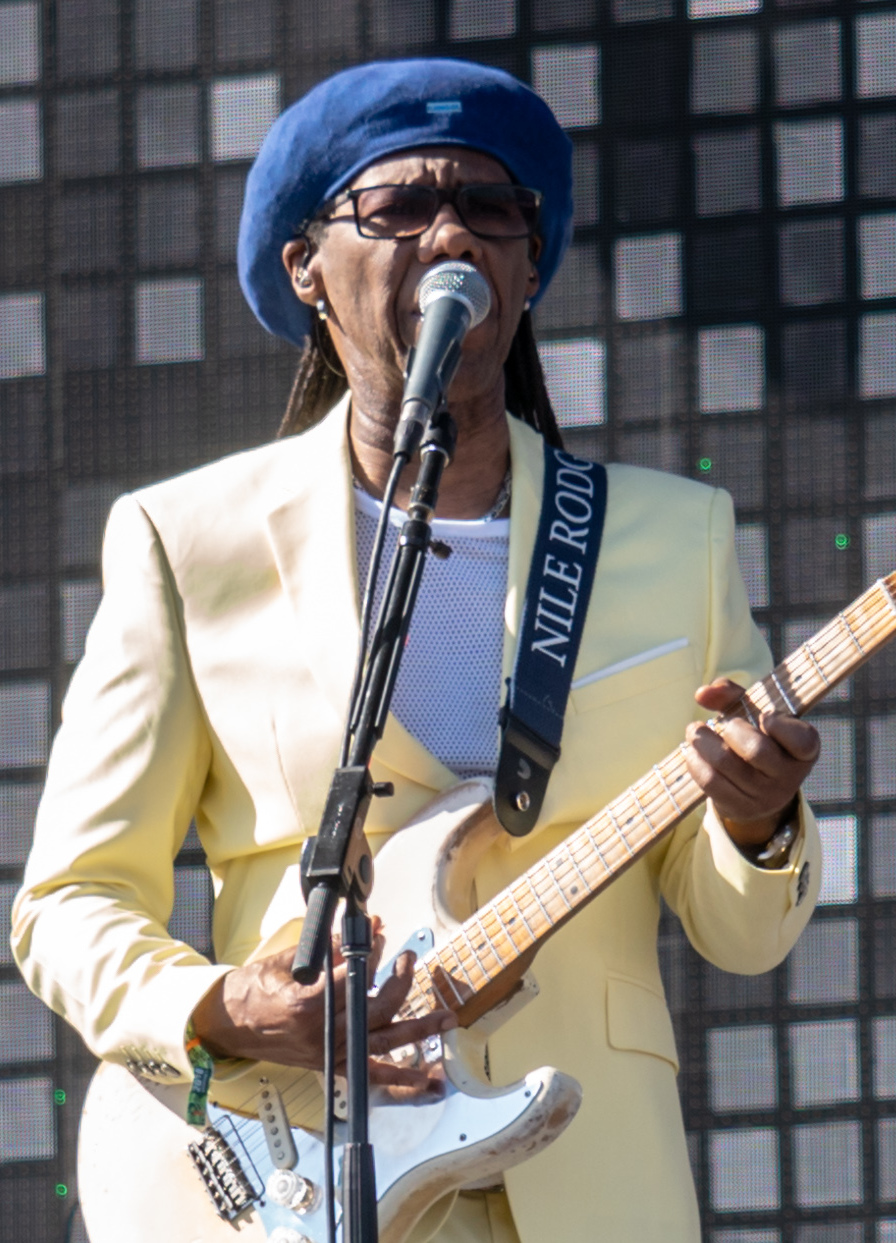
Daddy Yankee crossed an item off his bucket list by working with Nile Rodgers (pictured).

"Agua" was written by Daddy Yankee, Rauw Alejandro, Nile Rodgers, David "Raey" Fajardo, David "Scott Summers" Macías, Emmanuel "Eman" Anene, Gary Walker, Play-N-Skillz members Juan and Oscar Salinas, Rafael "Reggi El Auténtico" Aponte, and Raúl "Rey Santana" Treviño. It was produced and programmed by Daddy Yankee, Play-N-Skillz and Scott Summers, recorded by Emmanuel "Eman" Anene, mixed by American audio engineer Luis Barrera Jr., and mastered by American engineer Michael Fuller. Nile Rodgers was recorded at 5020 Studio in Miami. Dutch company CTM Entertainment, whose Latin division is creatively directed by Play-N-Skillz, posted on November 18, 2021 an image depicting Daddy Yankee and Rodgers at a studio in Miami, announcing a "new single coming soon," which may suggest that "Agua" was recorded during that time. Daddy Yankee crossed an item off his bucket list by working with Rodgers, who he admired since his childhood and referred to him as a "musical eminence," while Rauw Alejandro posted that collaborating with Daddy Yankee for the first time was a "dream come true" and acknowledged him as one of his inspirations.

The song's concept was to record a 1980s-inspired track featuring vocals by Rauw Alejandro, who had recently achieved success with his dance and synth-pop single "Todo de Ti" (2021), while also enlisting Nile Rodgers, who Daddy Yankee saw as the "creator" of iconic guitar sounds from the that era, such as Sister Sledge's "We Are Family" (1979), David Bowie's "Let's Dance" (1983) and Madonna's "Like a Virgin" (1984). "Agua" has been described as a "1980s-inspired dance" and "disco pop" song with a trap segment during Daddy Yankee's verse and has a length of three minutes and twenty-four seconds. Its love lyrics are performed by Daddy Yankee and Rauw Alejandro, while Nile Rodgers plays "funky" and "groovy" electric guitar riffs during the chorus. Daddy Yankee also briefly interpolates the chorus of "Con Altura" (2019) by Spanish singer Rosalía, with whom Rauw Alejandro has a relationship.

== Reception ==
Billboard's Latin editors selected "Agua" among the album's essential tracks, praising it as "one of the most surprising tracks on Legendaddy, taking Daddy Yankee completely out of his comfort zone." Writing for The New York Times, Isabelia Herrera referred to the track as "one refreshing moment of adventure," while Spin's Lucas Villa described it as "slick and alluring," an "irresistible pop-infused romp" and one of "the album's most exciting moments". "Agua" was also included among the record's highlights by Remezcla's Jeanette Hernandez, AllMusic's Thom Jurek and Spanish music website Jenesaispop's Jordi Bardají. The latter found its "succession of melodic and rapped hooks" to be "spectacular" and commended its synth-pop beat. Nile Rodgers' "classic disco guitar plucking" reminded Bajardí of his "essential contribution" on Daft Punk's "Get Lucky" (2013). The Recording Academy included it on their "Essential Guide to Daddy Yankee" list.

=== Accolades ===
Ceremony	Date	Category	Result
Premios Tu Música Urbano	June 23, 2022	Video of the Year	Nominated
Latin Grammy Awards	November 17, 2022	Song of the Year	Nominated

== Commercial performance ==
Following the release of Daddy Yankee's seventh and final record, Legendaddy, "Agua" debuted and peaked at number 21 and 189 on Billboard's Hot Latin Songs and Global Excl. US charts, respectively, on the week ending April 9, 2022, becoming the fourth highest-peaking song from the album on both lists. It also reached number 18 on Billboard's Latin Digital Song Sales chart. In Spanish-speaking countries, the track peaked at number 12 in Panama, at 28 on Billboard's Mexico Español Airplay chart and at 52 and Spain.

== Music video ==
The music video for "Agua" was one of the nine that premiered simultaneously with the release of Legendaddy on March 24, 2022. It was directed by Dominican filmmaker Marlon Peña, with whom Daddy Yankee had previously worked with on music videos including "Mayor Que Yo" (2005), "Shaky Shaky" (2017), "Con Calma", "China" and "Que Tire Pa' Lante" (all 2019), as well as on clips for the Legendaddy tracks "Rumbatón" and "La Ola". It depicts Daddy Yankee and Rauw Alejandro performing the track on coastal scenarios with dancers and luxury cars, with brief appearances by Nile Rodgers playing the guitar. The dancers were choreographed by Ukrainian choreographer Greg Chapkis, who also worked on Legendaddy's music videos for the tracks "Rumbatón" and "La Ola" as well as clips for other Daddy Yankee songs including "Con Calma" and "Que Tire Pa' Lante" (both 2019).

== Live performances ==
"Agua" was included in the setlist of Daddy Yankee's farewell concert tour, La Última Vuelta, in which Rauw Alejandro appeared on a holographic screen.

== Credits and personnel ==
- Rauw Alejandro – vocals, songwriting
- Emmanuel Anene – recording engineer, songwriting
- Rafael Aponte – songwriting
- Luis Barrera Jr. – mixing engineer, immersive mixing engineer
- David Fajardo – songwriting
- Michael Fuller – mastering engineer
- Play-N-Skillz – producer, programming, songwriting
- Nile Rodgers – electric guitar, songwriting
- Scott Summers – producer, programming, songwriting
- Raúl Treviño – songwriting
- Gary Walker – songwriting
- Daddy Yankee – vocals, producer, programming, songwriting

== Charts ==
=== Weekly charts ===
Weekly peak performance for "Agua"
Chart (2022)	Peak position
Bolivia (Monitor Latino)	6
Dominican Republic Pop (Monitor Latino)	6
Global Excl. US (Billboard)	189
Honduras Pop (Monitor Latino)	4
Mexico Español Airplay (Billboard)	28
Panama (Monitor Latino)	12
Spain (Promusicae)	52
US Hot Latin Songs (Billboard)	21

=== Year-end charts ===
2022 year-end chart performance for "Agua"
Chart (2022)	Position
Chile Pop (Monitor Latino)	55
Dominican Republic Pop (Monitor Latino)	28
El Salvador Pop (Monitor Latino)	70
Honduras Pop (Monitor Latino)	16
Panama (Monitor Latino)	94
Venezuela Pop (Monitor Latino)	41

2023 year-end chart performance for "Agua"
Chart (2023)	Position
Dominican Republic Pop (Monitor Latino)	67
Honduras Pop (Monitor Latino)	42
Panama Pop (Monitor Latino)	54
Puerto Rico Pop (Monitor Latino)	79
