= Rumbatón =

Single by Daddy Yankee

from the album Legendaddy
- Language: Spanish
- Released: March 24, 2022
- Genre: Reggaeton; bachata
- Length: 4:08
- Label: El Cartel; Universal; Republic
- Songwriters: Ramón Ayala; Eliel Lind; Francisco Saldaña; Ovimael Maldonado; Gabriel Cruz (Note: Received songwriting credit for the use of "Báilame" by Trebol Clan.); Gilberto Vélez; Héctor Pagan; Joselly Rosario
- Producers: Daddy Yankee; Luny

Daddy Yankee singles chronology
"Sal y Perrea (Remix)" (2021)	"Rumbatón" (2022)	"Agua" (2022)

Music video
- "Rumbatón" on YouTube

"Rumbatón" is a song by Puerto Rican rapper Daddy Yankee and the lead single from his eighth and final studio album, Legendaddy. Described by him as "the album's flagship", the song was released on March 24, 2022, simultaneously with the record and alongside a music video directed by Dominican filmmaker Marlon Peña, which depics a newlywed couple joining a street party in Puerto Rico. It uses the chorus from the track "Báilame" (2006) by Puerto Rican duo Trébol Clan. It was written by Daddy Yankee, Dominican producer and Luny Tunes member Luny and Puerto Rican producers Eliel and Ovimael "OMB" Maldonado. Puerto Rican rapper and lyricist Wise, producer DJ Joe and Trébol Clan members Periquito and Berto received songwriting credits for "Báilame". It was produced by Daddy Yankee and longtime collaborator Luny.

It is a "bachata-infused reggaeton" song reminiscent of Daddy Yankee's Barrio Fino single "Lo Que Pasó, Pasó" (2004)—produced by Luny Tunes and Eliel—and features the latter on piano and Dominican musician Lenny Santos, former member of Aventura, on guitar. It received positive comments by music critics, who praised its homage to reggaeton's tropical fusions of the 2000s, and its music video was nominated at the 17th LOS40 Music Awards. Commercially, "Rumbatón" peaked at number 82 on the Billboard Global 200 and number one in Puerto Rico and reached the top 10 in six countries, as well as the top 20 in six others, and received a platinum certification in Spain.

== Background and composition ==
"Rumbatón" was written by Daddy Yankee, Eliel, Luny Tunes member Luny and Ovimael "OMB" Maldonado, while Wise, DJ Joe and Trébol Clan members Gilberto "Berto" Vélez and Héctor "Periquito" Pagan received songwriting credits for the use of their track "Báilame" (2006). It was produced by Daddy Yankee, who also programmed it, and Luny, who had previously worked with him on the former's studio album Barrio Fino (2004)–most notably on its tracks "Gasolina" and "Lo Que Pasó, Pasó"–as well as several other singles including "Mayor Que Yo", "Machucando" (both 2005), "Noche de Entierro" (2006), "Limbo" (2012) and "Si Supieras" (2019). It was recorded and mixed by Luny and mastered by American audio engineer Michael Fuller.

It has been described as a "bachata-infused reggaeton" song reminiscent of "Lo Que Pasó, Pasó" and has a duration of four minutes and eight seconds, the longest from Legendaddy. Eliel, one of the producers of "Lo Que Pasó, Pasó", plays the piano on "Rumbatón". Rolling Stone's Gary Suárez wrote that with its addition of "a tropical flair" to the album, the track "[leans] into the island rhythms that preceded [Daddy Yankee's] chosen genre." The song takes its chorus from "Báilame" (2006), written by Wise, produced by DJ Joe and performed by Trébol Clan. Daddy Yankee had never heard "Báilame" until it was shown to him by Luny and decided to use the chorus in order to reminisce and give the song a retro and "timeless" feel while also combining it with contemporary sounds. He found the song interesting and wanted listeners who have not heard it, like him, to listen to it through a new version.

Daddy Yankee wanted to revive the reggaeton and tropical fusions of the 2000s, era in which songs like Tego Calderón's "Dominicana" (2002), Don Omar's "Dile" (2003) and "Pobre Diabla" (2004), Ángel & Khriz's "Ven Báilalo" (2004), Luny Tunes' "Mayor Que Yo" (2005), and Daddy Yankee's own "Lo Que Pasó, Pasó" (2004), "Ella Me Levantó" (2007) and "La Despedida" (2010) were released. "Rumbatón" also reminds him of the 1990s mixtape era, in which rappers in Puerto Rico used to record their own versions of each other's songs.

== Reception ==
Writing for The New York Times, Isabelia Herrera praised the track as a "nostalgic callback to the salsa-reggaeton fusions of the mid-[2000s]," with its "stadium-sized trumpets and vibrant piano lines". Spin's Lucas Villa described it as "a colorful celebration of Daddy Yankee's roots in the genre" through a horn-led "return to bachatón". It was selected among the record's highlights by Remezcla's Jeanette Hernandez and Spanish music website Jenesaispop's Jordi Bardají; the latter wrote that it "postulates as the potential song of the summer" in Spain due to its "silly chorus that encourages to dance reggaeton 'de lao' a lao'". The Recording Academy included it on their "Essential Guide to Daddy Yankee" list and its writer Isabela Raygoza described it as "a welcoming, farewell homage that captures Daddy Yankee's enduring legacy."

=== Accolades ===
Ceremony	Date	Category	Result
LOS40 Music Awards	November 4, 2022	Global Latin – Best Video	Pending

== Commercial performance ==
Following the release of Daddy Yankee's seventh and final record, Legendaddy, "Rumbatón" debuted and peaked at number 82 on the Billboard Global 200, becoming the album's second highest-charting song on the list after "X Última Vez" at number 23. In the United States, it reached number 19 on the US Hot Latin Songs chart. In Spanish-speaking countries, "Rumbatón" peaked at number one in Puerto Rico for three weeks, at two in El Salvador and Uruguay and reached the top 10 in Honduras, Ecuador, Chile, and Peru, as well as the top 20 in Spain–where it was the album's highest-charting song– Costa Rica, Guatemala, Mexico, Venezuela, Panama and Bolivia. It also charted at number 82 on the Argentina Hot 100 and at number 33 on the Paraguayan monthly top 100, and eventually received a platinum certification in Spain for units of over 60,000 track-equivalent streams.

== Music video ==
The music video for "Rumbatón" was one of the nine that premiered simultaneously with the release of Legendaddy on March 24, 2022. It was directed by Dominican filmmaker Marlon Peña, with whom Daddy Yankee had previously worked with on music videos including "Mayor Que Yo" (2005), "Shaky Shaky" (2017), "Con Calma", "China" and "Que Tire Pa' Lante" (all 2019), as well as on clips for the Legendaddy tracks "Agua" and "La Ola". It depicts a newlywed couple that end up joining a street party in the Puerto Rican municipality of Cabo Rojo just after their marriage. It features cameos by the song's producer Luny, as well as DJ Joe and Trebol Clan member Periquito, producer and one of the performers of "Báilame", respectively.

A dancer from Puerto Rican rapper Bad Bunny's staff revealed that dancers had to use in-ear monitors to listen to the track while the public and extras listened to a generic reggaeton drum pattern through speakers during the filming of the music video in order to avoid the song being leaked online. The dancers were choreographed by Ukrainian choreographer Greg Chapkis, who also worked on Legendaddy's music videos for the tracks "Agua" and "La Ola" as well as clips for other Daddy Yankee songs including "Con Calma" and "Que Tire Pa' Lante" (both 2019).

== Live performances ==
Daddy Yankee performed the song on a pre-recorded video as the opening act of the 19th Premios Juventud, held on July 21, 2022. It was included in the setlist of his farewell concert tour, La Última Vuelta.

== Credits and personnel ==
- Trébol Clan – songwriting
- Eliel – piano, songwriting
- Michael Fuller – mastering engineer
- DJ Joe – songwriting
- Luny – producer, recording engineer, mixing engineer, songwriting
- OMB – songwriting
- Lenny Santos – guitar
- Wise – songwriting
- Daddy Yankee – vocals, producer, programming, songwriting

== Charts ==
=== Weekly charts ===
Chart (2022)	Peak position
Argentina Hot 100 (Billboard)	82
Bolivia (Billboard)	19
Chile (Billboard)	8
Costa Rica (Monitor Latino)	11
Ecuador (Billboard)	6
El Salvador (Monitor Latino)	2
Guatemala (Monitor Latino)	13
Global 200 (Billboard)	82
Honduras (Monitor Latino)	5
Mexico (Monitor Latino)	5
Panama (Monitor Latino)	18
Peru (Billboard)	8
Puerto Rico (Monitor Latino)	1
Spain (Promusicae)	11
Uruguay (Monitor Latino)	2
US Hot Latin Songs (Billboard)	19
US Latin Airplay (Billboard)	11
Venezuela (Monitor Latino)	14

=== Monthly charts ===
Chart (2022)	Peak position
Paraguay (SGP)	33

=== Year-end charts ===
Chart (2022)	Position
Bolivia (Monitor Latino)	50
Chile (Monitor Latino)	47
Costa Rica (Monitor Latino)	43
Ecuador (Monitor Latino)	14
El Salvador (Monitor Latino)	14
Guatemala (Monitor Latino)	91
Honduras (Monitor Latino)	18
Latin America (Monitor Latino)	89
Panama (Monitor Latino)	83
Paraguay (Monitor Latino)	84
Peru (Monitor Latino)	54
Puerto Rico (Monitor Latino)	19
Uruguay (Monitor Latino)	14
US Latin Rhythm Airplay (Billboard)	36
Venezuela (Monitor Latino)	57

== Certifications ==
Region	Certification	Certified units/sales
Spain (Promusicae)	2× Platinum	120,000^{‡}
^{‡} Sales+streaming figures based on certification alone.
