= Para Siempre (Daddy Yankee song) =

Single by Daddy Yankee featuring Sech

from the album Legendaddy
- Language: Spanish
- Released: June 2, 2022
- Genre: Reggaeton
- Length: 3:30
- Label: El Cartel; Universal; Republic
- Songwriters: Ramón Ayala; Carlos Morales; Jhonattan Reyes; Johnny López; Justin Quiles; Miguel Martínez; Ramsés Herrera; Jorge Valdés
- Producers: Daddy Yankee; Dímelo Flow; Slow Mike; BK; Jhon El Diver

Daddy Yankee singles chronology
"X Última Vez" (2022)	"Para Siempre" (2022)	"Mayor Que Usted" (2022)

Sech singles chronology
"Llueve" (2022)	"Para Siempre" (2022)	"Dame Break" (2022)

Music video
- "Para Siempre" on YouTube

"Para Siempre" (English: "Forever") is a song by Puerto Rican rapper Daddy Yankee featuring Panamanian singer Sech, released as the fourth single from the former's eighth and final studio album, Legendaddy, on June 2, 2022. Its music video, shot in Colombia and Puerto Rico, was directed by Colombian director Juan "Jasz" Suárez and depicts a marriage proposal. It was written by Daddy Yankee, Sech, Panamanians Dímelo Flow, Ramsés "BCA" Herrera, Johnny "BK" López and Jhonattan "Jhon El Diver" Reyes, Colombian producer Slow Mike and American-Puerto Rican singer and lyricist Justin Quiles, and was produced by Daddy Yankee, Dímelo Flow, Slow Mike, BK and Jhon El Diver.

It is a romantic reggaeton song with lyrics about a marriage proposal and finding the "right partner". It was included among the album's best tracks by music critics, although it was also criticized as bland and prosaic. Commercially, it reached number 18 in Chile, number 24 on the US Hot Latin Songs chart and number 40 in Spain.

== Background and composition ==
"Para Siempre" was written by Daddy Yankee, Sech, Dímelo Flow, Ramsés "BCA" Herrera, Johnny "BK" López, ChocQuibTown member Slow Mike, Justin Quiles and Jhonattan "Jhon El Diver" Reyes, and was produced and programmed by Daddy Yankee, Dímelo Flow, Slow Mike, BK and Jhon El Diver. It was mixed and mastered by American audio engineers Vinny DeLeón and Michael Fuller, respectively. Daddy Yankee and Sech had previously collaborated on other singles including "Definitivamente" (2020) and the remix versions of "Relación" (2020) and "Sal y Perrea" (2021). It has been described as a "romantic mid-tempo reggaeton" and "soft pop ballad" with "R&B vibes" by Sech accompanied by an acoustic guitar. It has a duration of three minutes and thirty seconds and lyrics about a marriage proposal and finding the "right partner". Daddy Yankee stated that he identifies a lot with the track because of his relationship with his wife, to whom he dedicated lines about being together since poverty and the value of her companionship.

== Reception ==
"Para Siempre" was selected among the best tracks of Legendaddy by Billboard's Latin editors, Remezcla's Jeanette Hernandez, AllMusic's Thom Jurek and an editor of Happy FM. The latter commended its romanticism, absence of profanity and love message, referring to it as a "tremendous" collaboration. On the other hand, Isabelia Herrera of The New York Times found the song to follow "prosaic, predictable pop formats" and described it as weaving "acoustic guitar textures into a bland, mid-tempo popeton ballad".

== Commercial performance ==
Following the release of Daddy Yankee's seventh and final record, Legendaddy, "Para Siempre" debuted and peaked at number 18 in Chile, number 24 on the US Hot Latin Songs chart and number 40 in Spain. In the United States, it also reached number 20 on the Billboard Latin Digital Song Sales chart. It also peaked at number 68 on the Paraguayan monthly top 100.

== Music video ==
The music video for "Para Siempre" premiered on Facebook on June 2, 2022, and later on YouTube on September 7, 2022, and depicts a marriage proposal. It was filmed in Colombia, with its scenes directed by Colombian director Juan "Jasz" Suárez and produced by Colombian producer Andie Ortíz, and the Puerto Rican municipality of San Germán, whose segments were directed by Puerto Rican director Maricel Zambrano and produced by Puerto Rican producer Maleja Rodríguez.

== Credits and personnel ==
- BCA – songwriting
- BK – producer, programming, songwriting
- Vinny DeLeón – mixing engineer
- Jhon El Diver – producer, programming, songwriting
- Dímelo Flow – producer, recording engineer, programming, songwriting
- Michael Fuller – mastering engineer
- Slow Mike – producer, songwriting, programming
- Justin Quiles – songwriting
- Sech – vocals, songwriting
- Daddy Yankee – vocals, producer, programming, songwriting

== Charts ==
=== Weekly charts ===
Chart (2022)	Peak position
Chile (Billboard)	18
Spain (Promusicae)	40
US Hot Latin Songs (Billboard)	24

=== Monthly charts ===
Chart (2022)	Peak position
Paraguay (SGP)	68
