= Lamento en Baile =

Studio album by Daddy Yankee
- Released: October 16, 2025
- Genres: Latin Christian; Latin pop; merengue
- Length: 53:16
- Language: Spanish
- Labels: DY; Zarpazo
- Producers: Abel Xanders; Daddy Yankee; JBD JBD; La Companioni; Nando Pro; Nayhlo; Nekxum; Obrinn; OMB; Orlan Navarro; Sergio George; Súbelo Neo; Xound

Daddy Yankee chronology
Legendaddy (2022)	Lamento en Baile (2025)	La Postal (2026)

Singles from Lamento en Baile
- 1. "Sonríele" Released: July 10, 2025

Lamento en Baile (transl. Mourning into Dancing) is the ninth studio album by Puerto Rican rapper Daddy Yankee, released through DY Records and Zarpazo Records on October 16, 2025. Guest appearances include Alex Zurdo. Production was primarily handled by Yankee, OMB, and Xound, alongside Abel Xanders, JBD JBD, la Companioni, Nando Pro, Nayhlo, Nekxum, Obrinn, Orlan Navarro, Sergio George, and Súbelo Neo.

The title comes from Psalm 30:11, which says, "You have turned my mourning into dancing".

== Background ==
After releasing Legendaddy in March 2022, Yankee announced his retirement from music to close out his three-decade career. In July 2025, he signed to Zarpazo Records, a division of Hybe Latin America, and announced his return to music with the single "Sonríele".

Lamento en Baile saw Yankee's attempt to "revolutionize" pop culture with Jesus as a centerpiece.

== Release and promotion ==
The lead single "Sonríele" was released on July 10, 2025. A music video for "El Toque" was released alongside the album.

== Commercial performance ==
The lead single from the album, "Sonríele", peaked at No. 11 on the Billboard Hot Christian Songs. With the release of the album, "El Toque", peaked at No. 50 on the chart, and "Jezabel y Judas" later peaked at No. 37. The album itself peaked at No. 15 on the Top Christian Albums.

== Track listing ==
All tracks are written by Daddy Yankee and produced by Yankee, OMB, and Xound, except where listed.

Track listing
No.	Title	Writer(s)	Producer(s)	Length
1.	"¿Quién Es Dios?"			1:23
2.	"Tan Invitao'"			3:17
3.	"T Alabaré (Sal 27)"			2:53
4.	"Sonríele"	Yankee; Marcrilet Rodríguez	La Companioni; Nando Pro	2:57
5.	"ABCD" (featuring Alex Zurdo)	Yankee; Zurdo	Obrinn	2:50
6.	"El Toque"	Yankee; Sébastien Julien Alfred Graux	Súbelo Neo	2:48
7.	"Jezabel y Judas"		Yankee; OMB; Xound; Sergio George	4:15
8.	"DTB"			2:56
9.	"Tu Amor Me Conviene"			3:12
10.	"Principio y Valores"		Yankee; OMB; Xound; JBD JBD	2:01
11.	"Obra en Mí"			2:54
12.	"Love"		Abel Xanders	2:30
13.	"Jardín Rojo"			3:32
14.	"Toy Hermoso"	Yankee; Rodríguez	La Companioni; Nando Pro	2:57
15.	"Gloria a Él"			2:13
16.	"Ayo Ayo"		OMB; Xound; Nekxum; Nayhlo; Orlan Navarro	1:47
17.	"Súbete"			3:05
18.	"Una Vida"	Yankee; Rodríguez	La Companioni; Nando Pro	3:06
19.	"LEB"			2:40
Total length:				53:16

== Personnel ==
Credits adapted from Tidal.

=== Musicians ===
- Daddy Yankee – vocals, vocal arranging
- OMB – vocal arranging
- Xound – vocal arranging
- Graux – guitar (6)
- Diego Camacho – percussion (7)
- José García – trombone (7)
- Herbart Castro – trumpet (7)
- Carlos Orlando Navarro Huertas – guitar (9, 15–17)
- Abel Xanders – drums, keyboards (12)
- Nekxum – vocal arranging (16)

=== Technical ===
- OMB – mixing (all tracks), recording (1–3, 5–19), mastering (4)
- Ricardo Sangiao – mastering
- Nando – sound edition (4)
- Jonathan Barajas – recording (5)
- Luis Vega – recording (7)

== Charts ==
Chart performance
Chart (2025)	Peak position
US Top Christian Albums (Billboard)	15
