= Bombón (Daddy Yankee song) =

Single by Daddy Yankee, El Alfa and Lil Jon

from the album Legendaddy
- Language: Spanish; English
- Released: March 24, 2022
- Genre: Dembow
- Length: 3:02
- Label: El Cartel; Universal; Republic
- Songwriters: Ramón Ayala; Emmanuel Herrera; Jonathan Smith; Juan Salinas; Oscar Salinas; David Macías; Ovimael Maldonado; Antonio Romero (Note: Received songwriting credit for the interpolation of "Macarena" by Los del Río.); Rafael Ruíz
- Producers: Daddy Yankee; Play-N-Skillz; Scott Summers

Daddy Yankee singles chronology
"Agua" (2022)	"Bombón" (2022)	"Hot" (2022)

El Alfa singles chronology
"Galapin" (2022)	"Bombón" (2022)	"Máquina de Dinero" (2022)

Lil Jon singles chronology
"Bloodbath" (2022)	"Bombón" (2022)	"Dance" (2022)

Music video
- "Bombón" on YouTube

"Bombón" is a song by Puerto Rican rapper Daddy Yankee, Dominican rapper El Alfa, and American rapper Lil Jon. It was released on March 24, 2022 simultaneously with Daddy Yankee's eighth and final studio album, Legendaddy, among various other singles from the record. It was accompanied by a music video directed by Venezuelan director Daniel Durán. It was written by Daddy Yankee, El Alfa, Lil Jon, Mexican producer David "Scott Summers" Macías, Puerto Rican producer Ovimael "OMB" Maldonado and American production duo Play-N-Skillz members Juan Salinas and Oscar Salinas, while Spanish duo Los del Río members Antonio Romero and Rafael Ruíz received songwriting credits for their single "Macarena" (1993), which the song interpolates. It was produced by Daddy Yankee, Play-N-Skillz and Scott Summers.

It is a dembow song that received mixed reviews from music critics; some commented positively about it, while others criticized Lil Jon's ad-libs. Commercially, it reached number three in Nicaragua, 10 in El Salvador, 11 in Honduras, 19 in the Dominican Republic, 33 on Billboard's Hot Latin Songs chart and at 88 in Spain. It became a TikTok trend and was nominated for Best Social Dance Challenge at the 19th Premios Juventud.

== Background and composition ==
"Bombón" was written by Daddy Yankee, El Alfa, Lil Jon, David "Scott Summers" Macías, Ovimael "OMB" Maldonado and Play-N-Skillz members Juan Salinas and Oscar Salinas, while Spanish duo Los del Río members Antonio Romero and Rafael Ruíz received songwriting credits for their single "Macarena" (1993), which is briefly interpolated during El Alfa's verse. It was produced and programmed by Daddy Yankee, Play-N-Skillz and Scott Summers, recorded by OMB, and mixed and mastered by American audio engineers Luis Barrera Jr. and Michael Fuller, respectively. It is a dembow song with a duration of three minutes and two seconds. It is the first collaboration between Daddy Yankee and El Alfa; the latter posted that referred to the song as "one of the best moments" of his career and to Daddy Yankee as his idol. Daddy Yankee had previously worked together with Lil Jon on the remix versions of their singles "Gasolina" and "What U Gon' Do" (both 2004).

== Reception ==
Lucas Villa of Spin referred to "Bombón" as an "explosive dembow banger" in which Legendaddy's "ass-shaking continues to go off the Richter scale". Remezcla's Jeanette Hernandez selected it among the album's best songs and wrote that it "transports us to the beginning of [Daddy Yankee's] career," with "the help of El Alfa and Lil Jon’s essential ad-libs". The Recording Academy included it on their "Essential Guide to Daddy Yankee" list, part of their Songbook editorial series. On the other hand, Rolling Stone's Gary Suárez described it as "cringeworthy" due to Lil Jon "vomit[ing] his ancient ad-libs," which "[blunt] the presence of Dominican dembow demigod El Alfa" and "reduces the track to something from a Miami hotel pool party in 2012." Isabelia Herrera of The New York Times found it "virtually unlistenable" and referred to it as an "egregious misstep," describing it as "college spring-break music, complete with 'Yeah!' ad-libs from an era long gone." "Bombón" was nominated for a Premio Juventud for Best Social Dance Challenge at the 19th Premios Juventud.

== Commercial performance ==
Following the release of Daddy Yankee's seventh and final record, Legendaddy, "Bombón" debuted and peaked at number 33 on Billboard's Hot Latin Songs chart and at 88 in Spain. It also reached number three in Nicaragua, 10 in El Salvador, 11 in Honduras and 19 in the Dominican Republic. It became a TikTok trend and was used in over 2.5 million videos on the platform.

== Credits and personnel ==
- El Alfa – vocals, songwriting
- Luis Barrera Jr. – mixing engineer, immersive mixing engineer
- Michael Fuller – mastering engineer
- Lil Jon – vocals, songwriting
- OMB – recording engineer, songwriting
- Play-N-Skillz – producer, programming, songwriting
- Los del Río – songwriting
- Scott Summers – producer, programming, songwriting
- Daddy Yankee – vocals, producer, programming, songwriting

== Charts ==
=== Weekly charts ===
Chart (2022)	Peak position
Dominican Republic (Monitor Latino)	19
Honduras (Monitor Latino)	11
Nicaragua (Monitor Latino)	3
El Salvador (Monitor Latino)	10
Spain (Promusicae)	88
US Hot Latin Songs (Billboard)	33

=== Year-end charts ===
Chart (2022)	Position
Dominican Republic (Monitor Latino)	96
El Salvador (Monitor Latino)	33
Guatemala (Monitor Latino)	80
Honduras (Monitor Latino)	34
Nicaragua (Monitor Latino)	7
Peru (Monitor Latino)	100
US Latin Digital Song Sales (Billboard)	45
Venezuela (Monitor Latino)	69

== Certifications ==
Region	Certification	Certified units/sales
Spain (Promusicae)	Gold	50,000^{‡}
^{‡} Sales+streaming figures based on certification alone.
