= Philip Smart =

Musical artist (1960–2014)

- Born: 9 April 1960; Kingston, Jamaica
- Died: 25 February 2014 (aged 53) Port Washington, New York, U.S.
- Genres: Reggae, dub, dancehall
- Occupations: Sound engineer, record producer

Philip Smart (9 April 1960 – 25 February 2014) was a Jamaican music producer based in New York City.

== Biography ==
Born in Kingston, Jamaica, Smart's career spanned over five decades. While in high school, he produced his first record with reggae instrumentalist Augustus Pablo and vocalist Lee "Scratch" Perry. The transition to recording engineering came when the Augustus Pablo's album Java was being recorded. Errol Thompson was the project engineer and Smart was taught how to record to sixteen-track tape machines and how to make rough mixes to two-track tapes. This was followed by working with King Tubby, and then for producer Bunny Lee, who gave him the nickname Prince Philip. He was in fact King Tubby's first trainee, recording and mixing such hits as "None Shall Escape" by Johnny Clarke, "Jah Love" by Yabby U, and most of Dr. Alimantado's albums.

His HC&F Recording Studio in Freeport, Long Island, was built in 1981 and opened in 1982. The first recording project was with the group Monyaka, titled "Go Deh Yaka", which was an instant hit, and reached number 14 on the UK Singles Chart. Since that time, the studio had several very successful projects such as Jah Life Productions, which featured such artists as Sister Carol, Scion Success, Barrington Levy and Carlton Livingston. Smart is also known for work he did with artists under labels other than his own, such as Island In the Sun Productions artist Horace Andy; Narrows Records artist Mr Easy; Donovan Germain Productions artists Audrey Hall, Owen Gray, Tanto Irie, and Johnny Osbourne; and Witty's Music Master Productions artists Shelly Thunder, Junior Wilson and Barrington Levy.

With the 1990s came digital recording and the introduction of Pro Tools' two-track computer-recording program to the studio. The first hit recorded with Pro Tools was Dirtsman's "Hot This Year", which was released on Smart's TanYah records. He later produced "Rikers Island" by Cocoa Tea and Nardo Ranks. Later that year, Shaggy recorded "Mampie" with Smart; Red Fox and Screechie Dan's "Pose Off"; and "Shot Mek You Wiggle" by Junior Demus, which was later used in the film Dancehall Queen. From 1993 until 1993, Shaggy recorded five albums with Smart, including Boombastic and Hot Shot.

As dance music got bigger in 2000, multitrack Digidesign Pro Tools TDM was in demand, along with 24-track tapes. Mixes such as "Headacke", "All Out", and "Blue Drawers" were synced with 24-track tape and Pro Tools technology to achieve fatness and warmth placing emphasis on digital mixing and editing features. Smart's early Pro Tools and analog technology knowledge gave him a cutting edge in the 1990s, which provided reggae artists with the ability to record Jamaican-quality sound in New York.

== Death ==
Smart died on 25 February 2014, aged 53, in Port Washington, New York, from pancreatic cancer.
