= X Última Vez =

Single by Daddy Yankee featuring Bad Bunny

from the album Legendaddy
- Language: Spanish
- Released: April 6, 2022
- Genre: Reggaeton
- Length: 3:12
- Label: El Cartel; Universal; Republic
- Songwriters: Ramón Ayala; Benito Martínez; Juan Rivera; Ovimael Maldonado; Marco Masis
- Producers: Daddy Yankee; Tainy

Daddy Yankee singles chronology
"Remix" (2022)	"X Última Vez" (2022)	"Para Siempre" (2022)

Bad Bunny singles chronology
"Te Deseo Lo Mejor" (2021)	"X Última Vez" (2022)	"Moscow Mule" (2022)

Music video
- "X Última Vez" on YouTube

"X Última Vez" (read as "Por Última Vez" in Spanish Internet and instant-messaging slang; English: "For the Last Time") is a song by Puerto Rican rapper Daddy Yankee featuring compatriot rapper Bad Bunny, released as the third single from the former's eighth and final studio album, Legendaddy, on April 6, 2022. Its music video, shot in New York City in March 2022, was directed by Mexican director Fernando Lugo and depicts "futuristic visuals" in which both artists perform the track in a "dystopian-looking stage" and a "video game-like setting." It was written by both artists and producers Juan "Gaby Music" Rivera, Ovimael "OMB" Maldonado and Tainy, and was produced by Yankee and Tainy.

It is a reggaeton song with lyrics about "wanting to rekindle old flames" one last time and "finally saying goodbye to a relationship," and its title has a double meaning by also referring to the last time they will collaborate, since Daddy Yankee announced in March 2022 that he will retire from music after the end of his farewell concert tour. It was included among the album's best tracks by music critics and received the Top Song – Pop Urban award at the 3rd Premios Tu Música Urbano. Commercially, it reached number 23 on the Billboard Global 200 and the top 10 in 10 countries, as well as the top 20 in five others. It was the only song from Legendaddy to enter the Billboard Hot 100, peaking at number 73. It was certified triple Latin platinum in the United States and gold in Spain.

== Background and composition ==
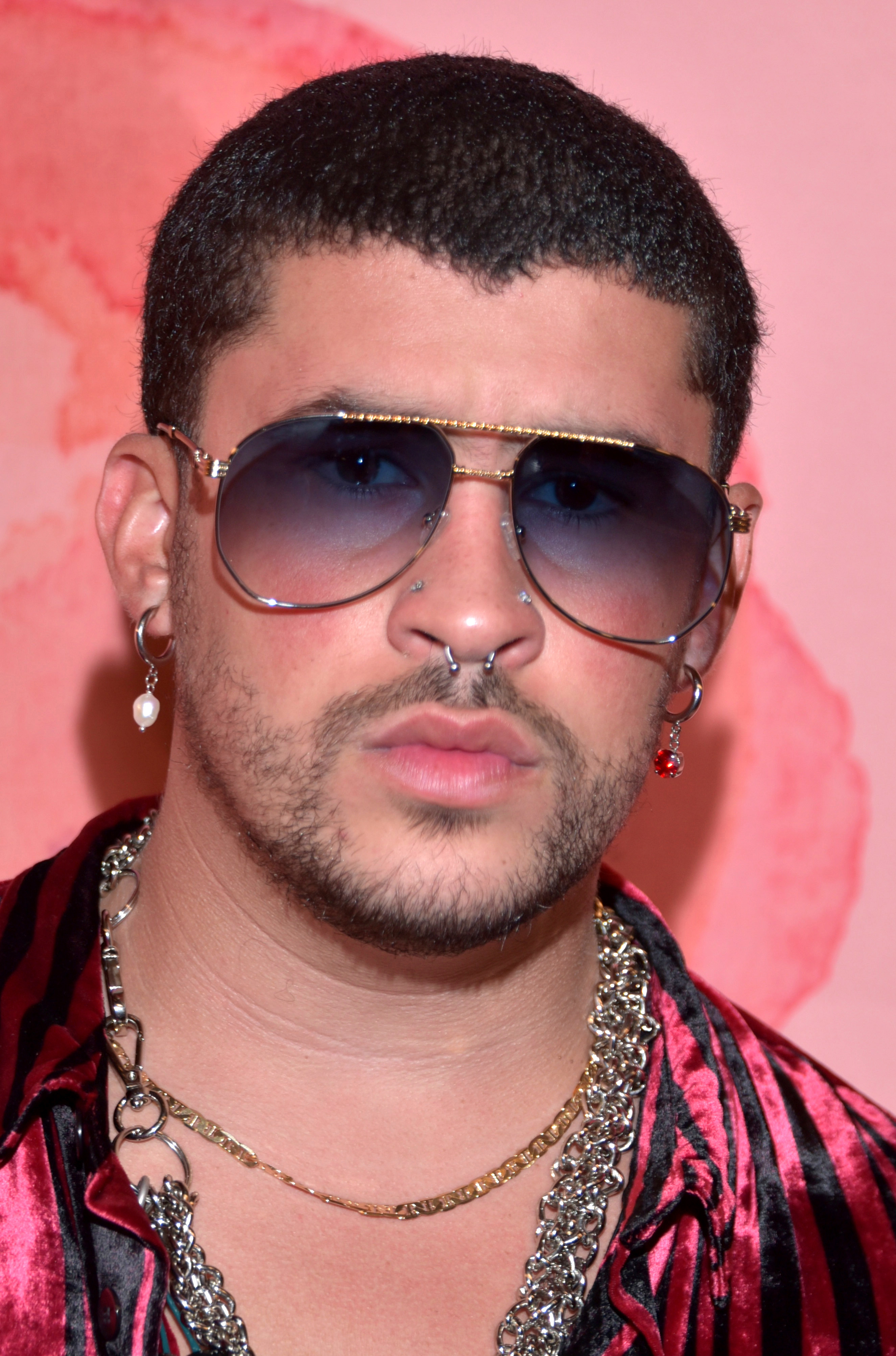
The song's title also refers to the last time Daddy Yankee and Bad Bunny (pictured) will collaborate due to the former's retirement.

"X Última Vez" was written by Daddy Yankee, Bad Bunny, Juan "Gaby Music" Rivera, Ovimael "OMB" Maldonado and Tainy, and was produced and programmed by Daddy Yankee and Tainy. It was recorded by Gaby Music and Puerto Rican producer La Paciencia, mixed by Gaby Music and Tainy, and mastered by American audio engineer Michael Fuller. Tainy thanked Daddy Yankee for inspiring him and wrote that "being in [his] last album is incredible for a kid who grew up listening to [him]," while Gaby Music posted that it was a "privilege to have worked with one of the artists that motivated [him] to make music." It is the seventh time Daddy Yankee and Bad Bunny had worked together since 2017, when they released their first collaboration, "Vuelve". Other collaborations between them include the remix version of "Soltera" (2019) and the YHLQMDLG track "La Santa" (2020).

It is a reggaeton song with a length of three minutes and twelve seconds that blends "old-school reggaeton beats with edgy urban sounds," with "sad and nostalgic" lyrics about "wanting to rekindle old flames" one last time and "finally saying goodbye to a relationship." The track begins with "bubbly-feeling piano notes that continue throughout the song and unite" Daddy Yankee's and Bad Bunny's musical styles. Bad Bunny references Daddy Yankee's "Donde Hubo Fuego", a track from the collaborative album 12 Discípulos (2004), by interpolating its chorus during his verse. The title has a double meaning by also referring to the last time Daddy Yankee and Bad Bunny will collaborate, since the former announced in March 2022 that he will retire from music after the end of his farewell concert tour, La Última Vuelta, in January 2023.

== Reception ==
Writing for Rolling Stone, Gary Suárez referred to the track as a "storming standout," while it was selected among the album's highlights by Billboard's Latin editors, Remezcla's Jeanette Hernandez and AllMusic's Thom Jurek. The Recording Academy included it on their "Essential Guide to Daddy Yankee" list.

=== Accolades ===
Ceremony	Date	Category	Result
Premios Tu Música Urbano	June 23, 2022	Top Song – Pop Urban	Won

== Commercial performance ==
Following the release of Daddy Yankee's seventh and final record, Legendaddy, "X Última Vez" debuted and peaked at number 23 on the Billboard Global 200 and is his third song with the most total weeks on the chart, with 11. In the United States, it debuted with 6.51 million streams and 700 paid downloads and was the only song from the album to enter the Billboard Hot 100, peaking at number 73. It also reached number five on the US Hot Latin Songs, becoming Daddy Yankee's 37th and last top 10 song on the chart. On the issue dated May 21, 2022, Bad Bunny broke the record for the most concurrent charting songs in a single week on Hot Latin Songs, with "X Última Vez" among his 24 record-breaking entries, charting at number 34. It received a triple Latin platinum certification by the Recording Industry Association of America (RIAA) on May 26, 2022 for units of over 180,000 track-equivalent streams.

In Spanish-speaking countries, the single peaked within the top five in Honduras, the Dominican Republic, Mexico, Bolivia and Chile, as well as the top 10 in Ecuador, Peru, Puerto Rico, Colombia and Costa Rica. It also reached the top 20 in Panama, Paraguay, El Salvador, Venezuela and Spain, where it received a gold certification by the Promusicae for units of over 30,000 track-equivalent streams, and peaked at number 45 in Argentina. It also peaked at number 13 on the Paraguayan monthly top 100.

== Live performances ==
"X Última Vez" was included in the setlist of Daddy Yankee's farewell concert tour, La Última Vuelta.

== Credits and personnel ==
- Bad Bunny – vocals, songwriting
- Michael Fuller – mastering engineer
- Gaby Music – recording engineer, mixing engineer, songwriting
- OMB – recording engineer, songwriting
- La Paciencia – recording engineer
- Tainy – producer, mixing engineer, programming, songwriting
- Daddy Yankee – vocals, producer, programming, songwriting

== Charts ==
=== Weekly charts ===
Chart (2022)	Peak position
Argentina Hot 100 (Billboard)	45
Bolivia (Billboard)	5
Chile (Billboard)	5
Colombia (Billboard)	10
Costa Rica (Monitor Latino)	10
Dominican Republic (Monitor Latino)	3
Ecuador (Billboard)	6
El Salvador (Monitor Latino)	13
Global 200 (Billboard)	23
Honduras (Monitor Latino)	2
Mexico (Billboard)	4
Panama (Monitor Latino)	12
Paraguay (Monitor Latino)	13
Peru (Billboard)	9
Puerto Rico (Monitor Latino)	9
Spain (PROMUISCAE)	17
US Billboard Hot 100	73
US Hot Latin Songs (Billboard)	5
US Latin Airplay (Billboard)	44
Venezuela (Monitor Latino)	14

=== Monthly charts ===
Chart (2022)	Peak position
Paraguay (SGP)	13

=== Year-end charts ===
Chart (2022)	Position
Costa Rica (Monitor Latino)	65
Dominican Republic (Monitor Latino)	47
El Salvador (Monitor Latino)	46
Honduras (Monitor Latino)	19
Nicaragua (Monitor Latino)	96
Paraguay (Monitor Latino)	33
Puerto Rico (Monitor Latino)	24
US Hot Latin Songs (Billboard)	44
Venezuela (Monitor Latino)	66

== Certifications ==
Region	Certification	Certified units/sales
Spain (PROMUSICAE)	Platinum	60,000^{‡}
United States (RIAA)	3× Platinum (Latin)	180,000^{‡}
^{‡} Sales+streaming figures based on certification alone.
