= Dirtsman =

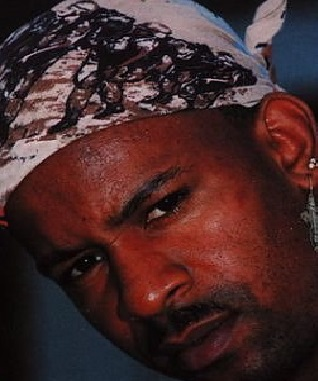
- Dirtsman in 1991

Background information
- Born: Patrick Thompson; 4 April 1965
- Origin: Spanish Town, Jamaica
- Died: 21 December 1993 (aged 27)
- Genres: Dancehall

Patrick Thompson (4 March 1965 – 21 December 1993), better known as Dirtsman, was a Jamaican dancehall deejay.

== Biography ==
Born in Spanish Town on 4 March 1965, Thompson was the son of the owner of the Black Universal Sound System, and was the brother of deejay Papa San.

Although he launched his career with his father's company, he later switched to the Willowdene-based Creation Rock Tower System. Recording since the mid-1980s, Dirtsman's biggest hits were "Thank You", produced by Steely and Clevie and "Hot This Year", produced by Bobby Digital and New York producer Philip Smart. He signed a contract with BMG but his career was cut short when four gunmen took his life on 21 December 1993.

== Discography ==
=== Albums ===
- Acid (1991), VP

=== Singles ===
- "Thank You" (1989), Steely & Clevie
- "Borrow Man" (1989), Steely & Clevie
- "Magnet and Steel" (1991), African Star
- "Watch the Galee" / "Woman Wan' Man" (12") (1991), Mafia and Fluxy
- "Mi Gun Nah Stick" (1991), Fashion
- "Bubble and Wine" (1991), Digital B
- "Graduation" (1991), Digital B
- "Why Threat" (1992), Digital B/New Sound
- "Hot Dis Year" (1992), Digital B
- "Simmer Down" (1992), Xterminator
- "Bad Mind" (1992), Pinnacle
- "Matey Boasy" (1993), Mafia and Fluxy
- "Caan Flop" (1993), Gussie P
- "Galong Bad" (1993), Fashion
- "Body Look Sweet", New Sound – B-side by Johnny Osbourne
- "Nah Put It Down" (12"), Digital-B
- "Peeping Tom", Super Power
- "Po Pow", Digital B
- "Strive", XTerminator
- "Dem Want More", Tan-Yah – B-side by Shelene
