= La Última Vuelta World Tour =

2022 concert tour by Daddy Yankee

- Tour by Daddy Yankee
- Location: Europe; North America; South America
- Associated album: Legendaddy
- Start date: July 16, 2022 (Note: While promotional material and Daddy Yankee's website state that the Spain dates are part of the tour, Daddy Yankee, his manager Raphy Pina, his label El Cartel Records and some media outlets referred to its July 25, 2022, show in Denver as its official start.)
- End date: December 22, 2022
- Legs: 3
- No. of shows: 86
- Attendance: 1.9 million
- Box office: US$205 million

Daddy Yankee concert chronology
- Con Calma Tour (2019); La Última Vuelta World Tour (2022); La Meta (2025)

La Última Vuelta World Tour was the eleventh headlining and farewell concert tour by Puerto Rican rapper and singer Daddy Yankee, in support of his seventh and final studio album Legendaddy (2022). Comprising 89 shows, the tour began on July 16, 2022, in Torremolinos, Spain and concluded on December 22, 2022, in Miami, Florida. It visited North America twice while making a one-month-lasting stop in South America, as well as a single European show in Spain as part of a music festival.

Initially, the tour was planned to end on January 8, 2023, with three sold out shows in Puerto Rico at Estadio Hiram Bithorn, which commemorated 30 years of a shooting incident that occurred on January 6, 1993, which allowed Daddy Yankee to focus entirely on his music career due to a bullet wound that ended his dream of becoming a professional baseball player. However, the concerts were cancelled due to logistical problems. Eventually, the concerts were rescheduled to be at Coliseo de Puerto Rico and were renamed as "La Meta".

The rapper announced that he plans to retire from music after the end of the tour in order to enjoy what he had achieved during his career. Before the beginning of the tour, he matched the record for the most consecutive shows at the Foro Sol in Mexico and became the first artist to sell out three shows in a single day at the Estadio Nacional in Chile. It was nominated for a Pollstar Award for Latin Tour of the Year. By its conclusion, La Última Vuelta became Daddy Yankee's most successful tour, the sixth highest-grossing tour worldwide of 2022 and the second highest-grossing Latin tour in Boxscore history, with a total gross of $205 million in ticket sales and 1.9 million attendees.

== Background ==
At the 28th Billboard Latin Music Awards on September 23, 2021, during Daddy Yankee's acceptance speech for his induction into the Billboard Latin Music Hall of Fame, he hinted at a retirement by saying to his fans to "enjoy his last musical round". On December 30, 2021, he confirmed that in 2022 he would "give his last round to the world". On March 20, 2022, after a 32-year career, Daddy Yankee announced his retirement from music after the end of his farewell concert tour, La Última Vuelta World Tour, as well as the release date for his final album, Legendaddy. Daddy Yankee decided to retire while working on the record and after feeling that the time had come to "look for something beyond the industry" and to "give himself the opportunity to enjoy everything he had achieved" during his career. He had previously stated on September 15, 2021 that he saw himself growing as an executive producer of movies and documentaries.

== Stage design ==
The three-floor stage of the concerts is composed of two big vertical screens and a horizontal one of 3,600 square feet (334 square meters), five live cameras, nine fire spraying machines, 20 circular LED reflectors by side, three-dimensional effects, pyrotechnics and 180 laser beams. Daddy Yankee performed alongside a live band of nine musicians, two backing vocalists and 16 dancers. Guest features Bad Bunny, Rauw Alejandro, Luis Fonsi, Lil Jon, Pitbull, Ozuna, Myke Towers, Wisin & Yandel and Zion & Lennox appeared through pre-recorded footage on a holographic screen, which was also used to display "a life-size gold airplane" at the start of the shows, of which Daddy Yankee emerged from.

== Ticketing and itinerary ==
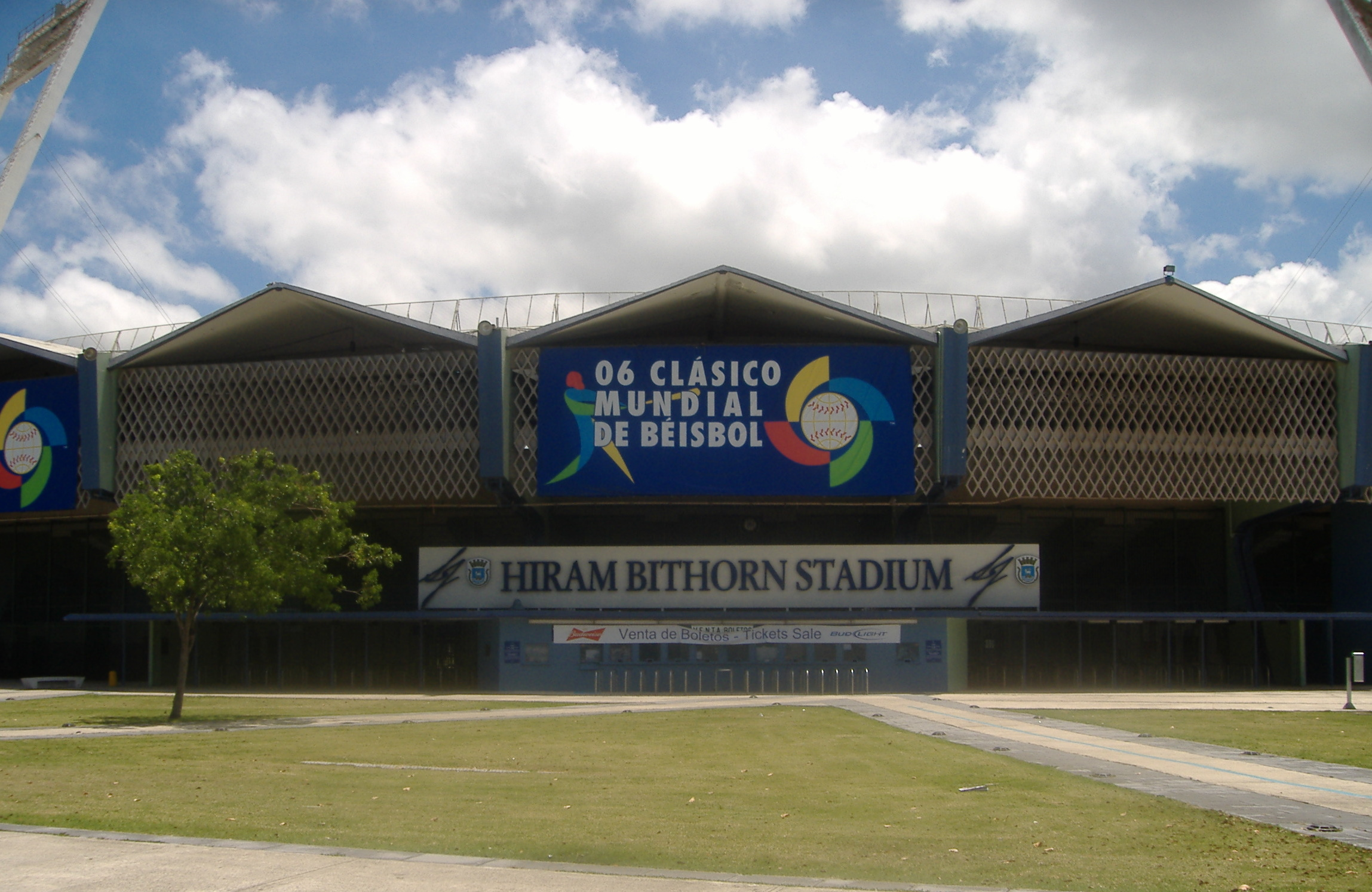
Daddy Yankee intended to give the last concert of his career at the Hiram Bithorn Stadium, venue of the Cangrejeros de Santurce, of which he is co-owner.

The initial dates were announced on March 20, 2022, with the tour scheduled to start on August 10, 2022 in Portland, Oregon and to end on December 2, 2022 in Mexico City, with a total of 41 shows. However, more dates were added, setting the tour's beginning on July 15, 2022 in Madrid, Spain and its conclusion on January 8, 2023 in San Juan, Puerto Rico, increasing its number of shows to 91. The tour's scheduled first date in Madrid, part of the Madrid Puro Reggaetón Festival at the Metropolitano Stadium, was cancelled at the last minute due to a breach of contract and security measures that did not meet the necessary requirements.

La Última Vuelta began in Torremolinos, Spain on July 16, part of the Puro Latino Fest, as the only show in Europe. The tour continued in the United States from July 25 in Denver to September 20 in New York City, with four stops between Rosarito, Mexico and the Canadian cities of Montreal and Toronto. It carried on in Latin America from September 23 in Santa Cruz de la Sierra, Bolivia through December 4 in Mexico City before returning to the United States on December 6 in Charlotte and giving the tour's last show of 2022 on December 22 in Miami. It continued in San Juan, Puerto Rico with three dates from January 6 to the tour's conclusion on January 8, 2023 at the Hiram Bithorn Stadium, ballpark of baseball team Cangrejeros de Santurce, of which Daddy Yankee is co-owner, shareholder and vice president of operations. The January 6, 2023 show commemorated 30 years of a shooting incident occurred on January 6, 1993, which frustrated Daddy Yankee's dream of becoming a professional baseball player due to a bullet wound on his leg but that allowed him to focus entirely on his music career.

== Set list ==
This set list is representative of the July 28, 2022 concert held at Kia Forum in Inglewood, California. It does not represent all dates throughout the tour.

1. "Jefe" (Instrumental intro)
2. "Campeón"
3. "Remix"
4. "Problema"
5. "Rompe"
6. "Machucando"
7. "Lo Que Pasó, Pasó"
8. "Rumbatón"
9. "Ella Me Levantó"
10. "Mayor Que Yo"
11. "No Me Dejes Solo"
12. "Tu Príncipe"
13. "Yo Voy"
14. "Shaky Shaky"
15. "Baila Baila Baila" (Remix)
16. "China"
17. "Pasatiempo"

Encore:

18. "Somos de Calle"
19. "Enchuletiao'"
20. "La Santa"
21. "X Última Vez"
22. "Agua"
23. Playero – "Que Tire Pa' Lante"
24. "Despacito"
25. "La Despedida"
26. "¿Qué Tengo Que Hacer?"
27. "Hot"
28. "Limbo"
29. "Bombón"
30. "Con Calma"
31. "Dura"
32. "Gasolina"

== Reception ==
=== Critical response ===
Remezcla's Alexis Hodoyán-Gastélum described the first of five shows in Los Angeles as "two hours of an epic non-stop dancing party" and "a trip down memory lane," as well as "a huge flex on having a career filled with hit after hit after hit, a sonic legacy that will live on for generations." She noticed nostalgia to be "a big component throughout the show," in which songs like "Rompe" (2005) and "Ella Me Levantó" (2007) "drew the best reactions from the crowd," as well as "more mainstream" singles including "Limbo" (2012) and "Con Calma" (2019). Billboard's Griselda Flores referred to the second concert at Kia Forum as a "high-tech, riveting show" with an "impressive production". It was nominated for a Pollstar Award for Latin Tour of the Year at the 34th Pollstar Awards.

=== Commercial performance ===
La Última Vuelta World Tour was the sixth highest-grossing tour of 2022, with earnings of over $197 million for the year's 83 shows and around 1.9 million ticket sales. It became Daddy Yankee's most successful concert tour of his career and the second highest-grossing Latin tour in Boxscore history, behind Bad Bunny's World's Hottest Tour. It was the second highest-grossing tour of the year in Latin America, with a gross of $112.7 million, and the 21st in North America, with $65 million. His five concerts at the Foro Sol in Mexico matched local band Grupo Firme's record for the most consecutive shows at the venue. Chilean concert production company Bizarro Live Entertainment reported that he became the first artist to sell out three shows in a single day at the Estadio Nacional Julio Martínez Prádanos in Chile after doing so in five hours.

== Tour dates ==
List of 2022 concerts
Date (2022)	City	Country	Venue	Opening act	Attendance	Revenue
July 16 (Note: The concert in Torremolinos on July 16, 2022 was part of the Puro Latino Fest.)	Torremolinos	Spain	Recinto Ferial de Torremolinos	—N/a	—N/a	—N/a
July 25	Denver	United States	Ball Arena	—N/a	12,132 / 12,165	$1,961,451
July 27	Inglewood	United States	Kia Forum	—N/a	59,226 / 61,687 (Note: This information is the total of the 5 concerts in the venue.)	$9,634,632
July 28	Inglewood	United States	Kia Forum	—N/a	59,226 / 61,687	$9,634,632
July 29	Inglewood	United States	Kia Forum	—N/a	59,226 / 61,687	$9,634,632
July 31	Phoenix	United States	Footprint Center	—N/a	12,048 / 12,207	$2,057,771
August 2	Oakland	United States	Oakland Arena	—N/a	12,082 / 12,948	$1,636,806
August 4	Seattle	United States	Climate Pledge Arena	—N/a	12,279 / 13,243	$1,910,646
August 6	Las Vegas	United States	T-Mobile Arena	—N/a	25,202 / 25,238 (Note: This information is the total of the 2 concerts in the venue.)	$4,143,187
August 7	Ontario	United States	Toyota Arena	—N/a	15,416 / 16,560 (Note: This information is the total of the 2 concerts in the venue.)	$3,012,255
August 10	Portland	United States	Moda Center	—N/a	12,899 / 12,899	$2,020,463
August 12	San Jose	United States	SAP Center	—N/a	12,463 / 12,588	$1,700,823
August 13	Inglewood	United States	Kia Forum	—N/a		
August 14 (Note: The concerts in Rosarito on August 14 and 21, 2022, are part of the Baja Beach Fest.)	Rosarito	Mexico	Papas & Beer Grounds	—N/a	—N/a	—N/a
August 15	Inglewood	United States	Kia Forum	—N/a		
August 18	Sacramento	United States	Golden 1 Center	—N/a	11,955 / 12,287	$2,268,396
August 19	Ontario	United States	Toyota Arena	—N/a		
August 20	Las Vegas	United States	T-Mobile Arena	—N/a		
August 21	Rosarito	Mexico	Papas & Beer Grounds	—N/a	—N/a	—N/a
August 23	Atlanta	United States	State Farm Arena	—N/a	11,659 / 11,659	$1,690,703
August 26	Orlando	United States	Amway Center	—N/a	12,019 / 12,256	$1,908,193
August 27	Miami	United States	FTX Arena	—N/a	25,424 / 25,424 (Note: This information is the total of the 2 concerts in the venue.)	$4,879,419
August 28	Estero	United States	Hertz Arena	—N/a	5,630 / 5,748	$924,093
August 30	Miami	United States	FTX Arena	—N/a		
September 1	Boston	United States	Agganis Arena	—N/a	5,766 / 5,874	$763,826
September 2	Uncasville	United States	Mohegan Sun Arena	—N/a	7,226 / 7,226	$834,256
September 4	Rosemont	United States	Allstate Arena	—N/a	12,476 / 12,476	$2,293,892
September 7	Washington, D.C.	United States	Capital One Arena	—N/a	13,492 / 14,100	$1,682,878
September 8	Newark	United States	Prudential Center	—N/a	12,164 / 12,164	$1,929,770
September 10	Montreal	Canada	Bell Centre	—N/a	14,654 / 14,654	$1,629,315
September 11	Toronto	Canada	Scotiabank Arena	—N/a	13,469 / 13,469	$1,915,993
September 14	San Antonio	United States	AT&T Center	—N/a	12,762 / 12,762	$2,015,598
September 15	Houston	United States	Toyota Center	—N/a	12,046 / 12,046	$1,838,985
September 16	Hidalgo	United States	Payne Arena	—N/a	5,373 / 5,373	$955,727
September 18	Dallas	United States	American Airlines Center	—N/a	13,458 / 13,458	$2,416,159
September 20	New York City	United States	Madison Square Garden	—N/a	12,487 / 12,487	$2,337,909
September 24 (Note: The concert in Santa Cruz on September 24, 2022, was originally announced to take place on September 23, 2022, but it was rescheduled due to undisclosed reasons.)	Santa Cruz	Bolivia	Estadio Ramón Tahuichi Aguilera	Corona	40,471 / 49,927	$3,981,257
September 27	Santiago	Chile	Estadio Nacional Julio Martínez Prádanos	Polimá Westcoast	196,917 / 198,225	$17,735,336
September 28	Santiago	Chile	Estadio Nacional Julio Martínez Prádanos	Polimá Westcoast	196,917 / 198,225	$17,735,336
September 29	Santiago	Chile	Estadio Nacional Julio Martínez Prádanos	Polimá Westcoast	196,917 / 198,225	$17,735,336
October 1	Buenos Aires	Argentina	Estadio José Amalfitani	El Osito Wito	78,047 / 78,047	$5,464,166
October 2	Buenos Aires	Argentina	Estadio José Amalfitani	El Osito Wito	78,047 / 78,047	$5,464,166
October 4	Guayaquil	Ecuador	Estadio Modelo Alberto Spencer	—N/a	31,025 / 31,025	$1,955,020
October 5	Quito	Ecuador	Estadio Olímpico Atahualpa	—N/a	29,271 / 29,721	$2,733,815
October 7	Cali	Colombia	Estadio Olímpico Pascual Guerrero	Philip Ariaz; El Clooy	36,249 / 36,249	$2,330,737
October 8	Bogotá	Colombia	Coliseo Live	Llane; SOG; Dekko; El Clooy	35,725 / 41,224	$4,062,042
October 9	Bogotá	Colombia	Coliseo Live	Llane; SOG; Dekko; El Clooy	35,725 / 41,224	$4,062,042
October 12	Bogotá	Colombia	Coliseo Live	Llane; SOG; Dekko; El Clooy	35,725 / 41,224	$4,062,042
October 14	Medellín	Colombia	Estadio Atanasio Girardot	Philip Ariaz	98,288 / 120,421	$6,704,389
October 15	Medellín	Colombia	Estadio Atanasio Girardot	Philip Ariaz	98,288 / 120,421	$6,704,389
October 16	Medellín	Colombia	Estadio Atanasio Girardot	Philip Ariaz	98,288 / 120,421	$6,704,389
October 18	Lima	Perú	Estadio Nacional del Perú	DJ Peligro	86,249 / 86,249	$8,223,897
October 19	Lima	Perú	Estadio Nacional del Perú	DJ Peligro	86,249 / 86,249	$8,223,897
October 22	San José	Costa Rica	Estadio Nacional de Costa Rica	Tapón & Dani Maro; Choché Romano, Jair Cruz & El Tigre Tony	68,025 / 70,587	$5,470,852
October 23	San José	Costa Rica	Estadio Nacional de Costa Rica	Tapón & Dani Maro; Choché Romano, Jair Cruz & El Tigre Tony	68,025 / 70,587	$5,470,852
October 27 (Note: The concert in Cancún on October 27, 2022, was originally scheduled on December 4, 2022, but it was rescheduled for logistic reasons.)	Cancún	Mexico	Estadio Andrés Quintana Roo	—N/a	30,048 / 30,048	$2,964,081
October 30 (Note: The concert in Veracruz on October 30, 2022, was previously scheduled on October 29, but it was postponed due to weather conditions. The show had originally been scheduled on November 29, 2022, before being rescheduled for logistic reasons.)	Veracruz	Mexico	Estadio Universitario Beto Ávila	—N/a	22,126 / 22,126	$2,399,900
November 2	Guatemala City	Guatemala	Explanada Cardales de Cayalá	—N/a	37,093 / 40,101	$4,158,978
November 3	Guatemala City	Guatemala	Explanada Cardales de Cayalá	—N/a	37,093 / 40,101	$4,158,978
November 5	San Salvador	El Salvador	Estadio Cuscatlán	—N/a	20,222 / 20,222	$1,557,040
November 8	San Pedro Sula	Honduras	Estadio Francisco Morazán	—N/a	19,942 / 25,381	$1,613,417
November 9	Tegucigalpa	Honduras	Estadio Nacional Chelato Uclés	—N/a	27,148 / 30,391	$1,968,519
November 12	Santo Domingo	Dominican Republic	Estadio Olímpico Félix Sánchez	DJ LG Mena	42,975 / 42,975	$3,083,944
November 19	Panama City	Panama	Estadio Rommel Fernández	—N/a	23,339 / 23,869	$1,596,521
November 21	Tijuana	Mexico	Estadio Caliente	—N/a	29,548 / 29,548	$2,741,401
November 23	Monterrey	Mexico	Estadio de Béisbol Monterrey	—N/a	60,508 / 62,002	$5,054,672
November 24	Monterrey	Mexico	Estadio de Béisbol Monterrey	—N/a	60,508 / 62,002	$5,054,672
November 26	Guadalajara	Mexico	Estadio Tres de Marzo	—N/a	47,791 / 53,054	$4,142,196
November 27	Guadalajara	Mexico	Estadio Tres de Marzo	—N/a	47,791 / 53,054	$4,142,196
November 29	Mexico City	Mexico	Foro Sol	—N/a	322,028 / 322,028	$24,382,114
November 30	Mexico City	Mexico	Foro Sol	—N/a	322,028 / 322,028	$24,382,114
December 2	Mexico City	Mexico	Foro Sol	—N/a	322,028 / 322,028	$24,382,114
December 3	Mexico City	Mexico	Foro Sol	—N/a	322,028 / 322,028	$24,382,114
December 4	Mexico City	Mexico	Foro Sol	—N/a	322,028 / 322,028	$24,382,114
December 6	Charlotte	United States	Spectrum Center	—N/a	13,902 / 13,902	$2,446,333
December 8	Newark	United States	Prudential Center	—N/a	12,520 / 12,520	$2,190,163
December 9	Elmont	United States	UBS Arena	—N/a	13,262 / 13,262	$2,431,800
December 10	Reading	United States	Santander Arena	—N/a	6,584 / 6,584	$1,159,033
December 12	Rosemont	United States	Allstate Arena	—N/a	24,643 / 24,643	$3,632,615
December 13	Rosemont	United States	Allstate Arena	—N/a	24,643 / 24,643	$3,632,615
December 15	Austin	United States	Moody Center	—N/a	11,061 / 11,326	$1,730,700
December 16	San Antonio	United States	AT&T Center	—N/a	13,230 / 13,230	$1,979,767
December 18	Orlando	United States	Amway Center	—N/a	21,699 / 23,676	$3,382,345
December 19	Orlando	United States	Amway Center	—N/a	21,699 / 23,676	$3,382,345
December 21	Miami	United States	FTX Arena	—N/a	25,633 / 25,633	$4,453,919
December 22	Miami	United States	FTX Arena	—N/a	25,633 / 25,633	$4,453,919
Total					1,900,953 / 1,970,744 (96.36%)	$198,094,115

=== Cancelled shows ===
List of cancelled concerts
Date	City	Country	Venue	Reason
July 15, 2022 (Note: The concert in Madrid on July 15, 2022 was due to be part of the Puro Reggaetón festival.)	Madrid	Spain	Caja Mágica	Breach of contract
September 25, 2022 (Note: The concert in Asunción was deleted from the official tour schedule in September 2022. A venue was never officially announced.)	Asunción	Paraguay	—N/a	Unknown reasons
October 14, 2022	Barranquilla	Colombia	Estadio Metropolitano Roberto Meléndez	Unknown reasons
January 6, 2023	San Juan	Puerto Rico	Estadio Hiram Bithorn	Logistical reasons
January 7, 2023	San Juan	Puerto Rico	Estadio Hiram Bithorn	Logistical reasons
January 8, 2023	San Juan	Puerto Rico	Estadio Hiram Bithorn	Logistical reasons

== See also ==
- List of most-attended ticketed multi-night concerts
