= Jenesaispop =

Online Spanish news and reviews website

- Type: Online music magazine
- Industry: Pop music, cinema, literature
- Founded: 2006; 20 years ago
- Founders: Sebas E. Alonso
- Headquarters: Spain
- Website: jenesaispop.com

Jenesaispop, also known as JNSP, is an online Spanish independent news and reviews website focused on pop music, although it is also dedicated to films, TV series, books and comics. It was founded in 2006 by nine friends, including various journalists, who wanted to dignify pop music through recommendations of non-mainstream records. It has been referred to as the most-read independent music website in Spain as of 2020, year in which they published their first book.

== History ==
Jenesaispop was founded in 2006 by nine friends, including various journalists, who had their respective personal blogs and wanted to dignify pop music through an online fanzine with recommendations of songs that they considered were not receiving the exposure they deserved. They consider themselves "a pop music media above all" that endorses music "that anyone would like". It started doing well around 2010, when it had over 150,000 unique monthly visitors, and is the most-read independent music website in Spain as of 2020, according to Vogue magazine. In 2020, Jenesaispop celebrated its 15th anniversary by publishing its first book, Un Viaje Por 200 Discos Clave del Siglo XXI (Spanish for A Journey Through... 200 Key Records of the 21st Century), written by the website's director, Sebas E. Alonso.

The staff of Jenesaispop have interviewed numerous international celebrities, including Madonna, Clean Bandit, Mon Laferte, among others.

== Album of the year ==
The following records have been named "album of the year" by Jenesaispop.

- 2024 – Charli XCX, Brat
- 2023 – Caroline Polachek, Desire, I Want to Turn Into You
- 2022 – Rosalía, Motomami
- 2021 – Zahara, Puta
- 2020 – Dua Lipa, Future Nostalgia
- 2019 – FKA Twigs, Magdalene
- 2018 – Rosalía, El Mal Querer
- 2017 – Lorde, Melodrama
- 2016 – David Bowie, Blackstar
- 2015 – Sufjan Stevens, Carrie & Lowell
- 2014 – Caribou, Our Love
- 2013 – James Blake, Overgrown
- 2012 – Beach House, Bloom
- 2011 – PJ Harvey, Let England Shake
- 2010 – Triángulo de Amor Bizarro, Año Santo
- 2009 – The xx, xx
- 2008 – Portishead, Third
- 2007 – Amy Winehouse, Back to Black
- 2006 – Belle & Sebastian, The Life Pursuit

== Bibliography ==
- 2020: Alonso, Sebas. Un Viaje Por 200 Discos Clave del Siglo XXI. Self-published. ISBN 978-840-92-43.
