= Pusho =

Puerto Rican rapper

- Also known as: Pusho 'El MVP'; Mr. Like
- Born: Héctor Emmanuel Birriel Caraballo; December 28, 1989 (age 36); Carolina, Puerto Rico
- Genres: Reggaeton; urban music
- Occupations: Rapper; singer
- Label: Casablanca Records
- Website: pushocpw.com

Héctor Emmanuel Birriel Caraballo, known professionally as Pusho, is a Puerto Rican rapper and singer.

Pusho first came to prominence online, posting songs through Freestyle Mania Music. In 2014, he signed with Casablanca Records and released his debut album, Rookie of the Year. He has also collaborated on songs with such artists as Daddy Yankee, Farruko, Miky Woodz, JKing & Maximan, J Alvarez, Cosculluela, De La Ghetto, Ozuna, Benni Benny, El Sica, D. OZi, and producers such as Musicólogo y Menes, Montana "The Producer", Franfucion, and others. Pusho is also a father of two girls.

== Arrests ==
He has had problems with the law, being charged twice of possessing illegal guns, leading him to be arrested one time in the neighborhood of Miramar Santurce, Puerto Rico with another man called Juan Thomas George of 32 years of age. Police reported that both men were caught carrying "two illegal firearms," one of 0.9 and another 0.40 millimeters, and $1,228 in cash and a white 2015 Mercedes-Benz, which was also seized by police. Pusho was again arrested in Chile along with another man for having illegal guns It resulted in him having to cancel his presentations in the country.
