= Daddy Yankee discography =

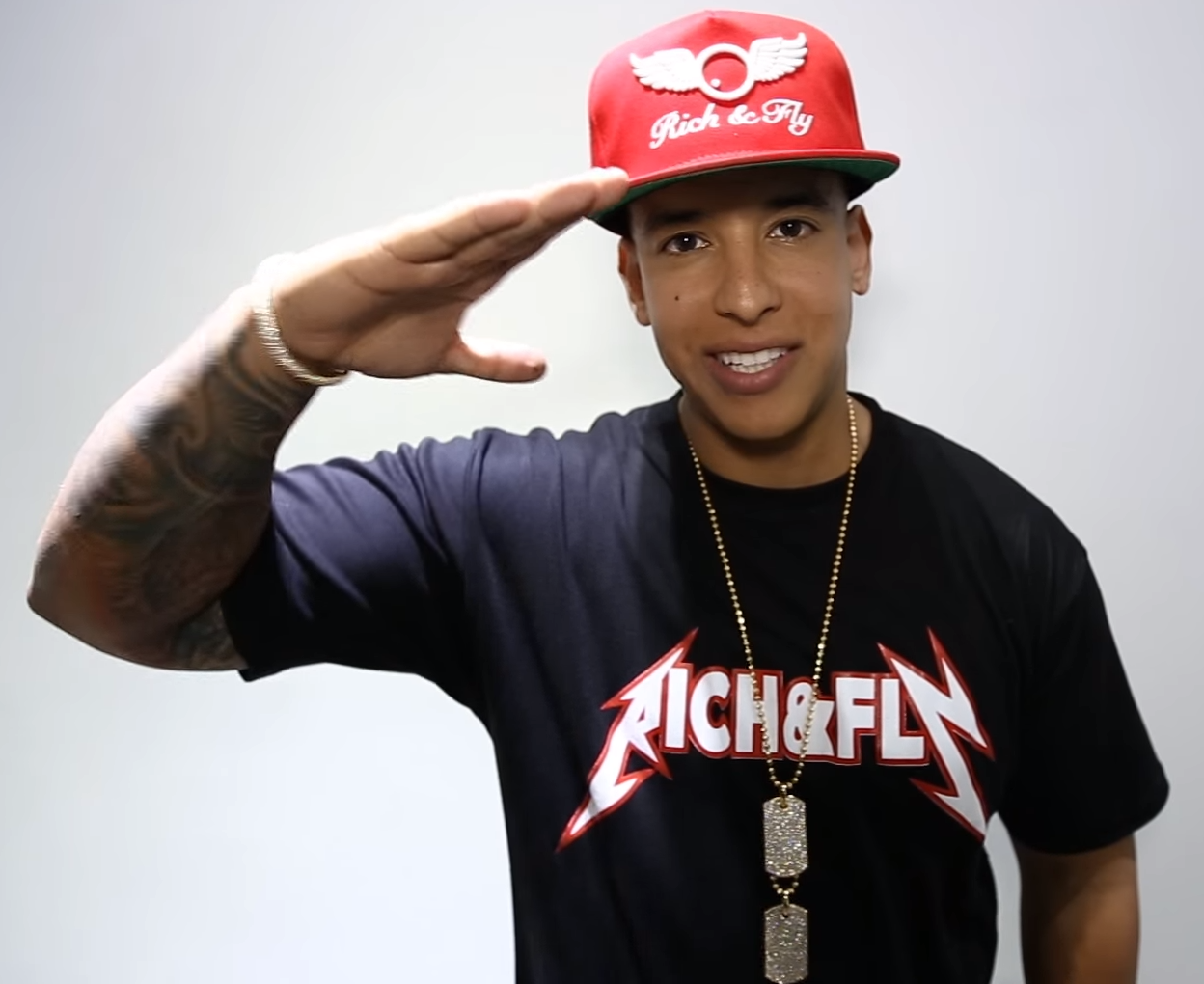
- Yankee at a meet & greet in 2015.
- Studio albums: 9
- Soundtrack albums: 1
- Live albums: 2
- Compilation albums: 1
- Singles: 117

The Puerto Rican rapper Daddy Yankee has released nine studio albums, two live albums, 117 singles (including 30 as a featured artist), and one soundtrack. He made his debut on DJ Playero's Playero 34 mixtape, released in 1991. He was later featured on Playero's 37 and 38 albums, before releasing his first solo record in 1995, titled No Mercy. During the rest of the 1990s, he continued working on underground reggaeton records and released his first album as producer El Cartel de Yankee in 1997. After the release of his 2001 independent album El Cartel II: Los Cangris, he released his second studio album, El Cangri.com, in June 2002. It is cited as the record that made him notorious outside his natal Puerto Rico, being his music introduced in New York City and Miami. Without any major label backing him, El Cangri.com managed to peak at number 43 on the US Top Latin Albums chart. A track from the album, "Brugal Mix", became his first Billboard chart entry by peaking at number 40 on the US Tropical Songs chart in November 2002.

He later released Los Homerun-es in 2003, a compilation album that features re-recorded Playero mixtape tracks, which peaked at number 158 in the United States and at number seven on the US Top Latin Albums chart. Barrio Fino, his third studio album, was released in July 2004 and became the first reggaeton record to debut and peak at number one on the US Top Latin Albums chart. It was later certified platinum by the Recording Industry Association of America. Barrio Fino is cited as the album that introduced reggaeton into the mainstream market and became the best selling Latin album of the 2000s decade in the United States. The success of its lead single "Gasolina" led to the creation of a new radio format in the United States named Latin Rhythm Airplay. A follow-up live album, titled Barrio Fino en Directo, was released in December 2005 and spent fourteen weeks at the top of the US Top Latin Albums, subsequently receiving a gold certification.

His fourth studio album El Cartel: The Big Boss (2007) became his first top ten entry in the United States by peaking at number nine and earned a triple platinum (Latin) certification by the RIAA. Its singles "Impacto" and "Ella Me Levantó" both peaked at number two on the US Hot Latin Songs chart. Talento de Barrio, a soundtrack for the namesake film, was released in August 2008. Mundial, his fifth studio album, was released in April 2010. His sixth studio album Prestige was released in September 2012 and includes the US Latin number one singles "Lovumba" and "Limbo". A mixtape titled King Daddy was released in October 2013 and became the first digital-only album to rank within the top ten on the US Top Latin Albums chart.

In 2017, Daddy Yankee was featured on Luis Fonsi's single "Despacito", which topped the charts in 47 countries, including the United States, the United Kingdom, and Canada, aided by a remix version featuring Justin Bieber. It became the first primarily Spanish-language song to peak at number one on the Billboard Hot 100 since 1996 and topped the chart for 16 weeks, tying with "One Sweet Day" by Mariah Carey and Boyz II Men as the longest-reigning number-one single in the chart's history. The song also became the longest-reigning number one on the Billboard Hot Latin Songs chart with 52 weeks and the longest-reigning foreign language number one in the United Kingdom with 11 weeks. Its success led Daddy Yankee to become the most listened artist worldwide on the streaming service Spotify in June 2017, being the first Latin artist to do so.

As of October 2017, Barrio Fino and Barrio Fino en Directo are the seventh and 13th best selling Latin albums in the United States, respectively. During his career, Daddy Yankee hit 67 entries on the US Hot Latin Songs chart, from which six peaked at number one, 18 reached the top five, and 28 ranked within the top 10. He is the sixth artist with most top 10 singles on Hot Latin Songs, as well as the one with most entries. On the Billboard Hot 100, he charted 13 titles, including a number-one peak and five top 40 singles.

== Albums ==
=== Studio albums ===
List of studio albums, showing selected details, chart positions and certifications
Title	Album details	Peak chart positions										Sales	Certifications
Title	Album details	US	US Latin	US Rap	AUT	FRA	ITA	MEX	POR	SPA	SWI	Sales	Certifications
No Mercy	Released: April 1995; Label: White Lion, BM; Formats: CD, cassette	—	—	—	—	—	—	—	—	—	—		
El Cangri.com	Released: June 20, 2002; Label: VI Music; Formats: CD, digital download	—	43	—	—	—	—	—	—	—	—		
Barrio Fino	Released: July 13, 2004; Label: VI Music, El Cartel; Formats: CD, digital download	26	1	16	51	67	46	8	26	26	28	US: 1,083,000; CAN: 9,300; MEX: 100,000	RIAA: Platinum; AMPROFON: Platinum
El Cartel: The Big Boss	Released: June 5, 2007; Label: El Cartel, Interscope; Formats: CD, digital download	9	1	1	—	—	—	5	—	65	52	US: 300,000; MEX: 50,000	RIAA: 3× Platinum (Latin); AMPROFON: Gold
Mundial	Released: April 27, 2010; Label: El Cartel, Sony Latin; Formats: CD, digital download	29	1	10	—	—	—	28	—	—	—	US: 57,842	
Prestige	Released: September 11, 2012; Label: El Cartel, Capitol Latin; Formats: CD, digital download	39	1	5	—	—	—	44	—	—	93	US: 50,000	RIAA: 2× Platinum (Latin)
Legendaddy	Released: March 24, 2022; Label: El Cartel, Republic; Formats: CD, digital download, streaming	8	1	—	—	—	77	—	—	2	17		RIAA: Platinum (Latin); PROMUSICAE: Gold
Lamento en Baile	Released: October 16, 2025; Label: DY, Zarpazo; Formats: Digital download, streaming	— (Note: Lamento en Baile did not enter the US Billboard 200, but peaked at number 15 on the Top Christian Albums chart.)	—	—	—	—	—	—	—	—	—		
La Postal	Released: October 30, 2026; Label: DY; Formats: Digital download, streaming	—	23	—	—	—	—	—	—	29	—		
"—" denotes a recording that did not chart or was not released in that territory.

=== Compilations ===
List of compilation albums, with selected chart positions
Title	Album details	Peak chart positions				
Title	Album details	US	US Latin	US R&B	US Reggae	US Tropical
Los Homerun-es	Released: February 28, 2003; Label: El Cartel, VI Music, Machete Music; Formats: CD	158	7	63	3	4
Con Calma & Mis Grandes Éxitos	Released: June 21, 2019; Label: El Cartel, Interscope; Formats: CD	—	—	—	—	—
"—" denotes a recording that did not chart or was not released in that territory.

=== Live albums ===
List of live albums, with selected chart positions and sales figures
Title	Album details	Peak chart positions					Sales	Certifications
Title	Album details	US	US Latin	US Rap	US Reggae	US Tropical	Sales	Certifications
Ahora le Toca al Cangri! Live	Released: March 15, 2005; Label: VI Music; Formats: CD	104	3	—	2	3		
Barrio Fino en Directo	Released: December 13, 2005; Label: El Cartel, Interscope; Formats: CD, digital download	24	1	6	—	—	US: 809,000 (Note: United States sales figures for Barrio Fino en Directo as of October 2017.); MEX: 100,000 (Note: Mexico sales figures for Barrio Fino en Directo as of July 2006.)	RIAA: Gold; AMPROFON: Platinum
"—" denotes a recording that did not chart or was not released in that territory.

=== Other albums ===
List of albums, with selected chart positions and sales figures
Title	Album details	Peak chart positions					Sales	Certifications
Title	Album details	US	US Latin	US Rap	US Sound.	MEX	Sales	Certifications
El Cartel	Released: 1997; Label: El Cartel, VI Music, Guatauba; Formats: CD	—	—	—	—	—		
El Cartel II	Released: March 15, 2001; Label: El Cartel, Pina, VI Music; Formats: CD	—	—	—	—	—		
Talento de Barrio	Released: August 12, 2008; Label: El Cartel, Machete Music; Formats: CD, digital download	13	1	6	3	28	US: 200,000 (Note: United States sales figures for Talento de Barrio as of April 2009.)	RIAA: 2× Platinum (Latin)
King Daddy	Released: October 29, 2013; Label: El Cartel; Formats: Digital download	—	7	—	—	—	US: 2,000 (Note: United States sales figures for King Daddy as of November 2013.)	PROMUSICAE: Gold
"—" denotes a recording that did not chart or was not released in that territory.

== Singles ==
=== As lead artist ===
==== 2000s ====
List of singles released in the 2000s decade as lead artist, showing selected chart positions, certifications, and associated albums
Title	Year	Peak chart positions								Certifications	Album
Title	Year	US	US Latin	FRA	GER	ITA	MEX	SWI	UK	Certifications	Album
"Latigazo"	2002	—	—	—	—	—	—	—	—		El Cangri.com
"Segurosqui"	2003	—	—	—	—	—	—	—	—		Los Homerun-es
"Lo Que Pasó, Pasó"	2004	— (Note: "Lo Que Pasó, Pasó" did not enter the US Billboard Hot 100, but peaked at number 6 on the US Bubbling Under Hot 100 chart.)	2	—	—	—	—	35	—		Barrio Fino
"Gasolina"	2004	32	17	12	7	2	—	5	5	RIAA: 33× Platinum (Latin); BPI: Platinum; BVMI: Platinum; FIMI: Platinum	Barrio Fino
"No Me Dejes Solo" (featuring Wisin & Yandel and Glory)	2005	—	32	—	—	—	—	—	—		Barrio Fino
"Like You"	2005	78	—	—	—	—	—	—	—		Barrio Fino
"Rompe"	2005	24	1	—	64	—	—	—	—	RIAA: Platinum	Barrio Fino en Directo
"Gangsta Zone" (featuring Snoop Dogg)	2006	—	— (Note: "Gangsta Zone" did not enter the US Billboard Hot 100, but peaked at number 21 on the Latin Rhythm Airplay chart.)	—	—	—	—	—	—		Barrio Fino en Directo
"Machucando"	2006	— (Note: "Machucando" did not enter the US Billboard Hot 100, but peaked at number 7 on the Bubbling Under Hot 100 chart.)	2	—	—	—	—	—	—		Barrio Fino en Directo
"El Truco"	2006	—	— (Note: "El Truco" did not enter the US Billboard Hot 100, but peaked at number 24 on the Latin Rhythm Airplay chart.)	—	—	—	—	—	—		Barrio Fino en Directo
"Impacto" (Note: The official remix features American singer Fergie.)	2007	56	2	—	—	—	—	—	—		El Cartel: The Big Boss
"Ella Me Levantó"	2007	— (Note: "Ella Me Levantó" did not enter the US Billboard Hot 100, but peaked at number 20 on the Bubbling Under Hot 100 chart.)	2	—	—	—	—	—	—		El Cartel: The Big Boss
"Somos de Calle"	2008	—	— (Note: "Somos de Calle" did not enter the US Billboard Hot 100, but peaked at number 10 on the Latin Rhythm Airplay chart.)	—	—	—	—	—	—		Talento de Barrio
"Pose"	2008	— (Note: "Pose" did not enter the US Billboard Hot 100, but peaked at number 23 on the Bubbling Under Hot 100 chart.)	4	—	—	—	27	—	—		Talento de Barrio
"Llamado de Emergencia"	2008	—	17	—	—	—	37	—	—		Talento de Barrio
"¿Qué Tengo Que Hacer?"	2009	—	20	—	—	—	—	—	—		Talento de Barrio
"El Ritmo No Perdona (Prende)"	2009	—	48	—	—	—	—	—	—		Mundial
"Grito Mundial"	2009	—	24	—	—	—	— (Note: "Grito Mundial" did not enter the Mexico Airplay, but peaked at number 33 on the Mexico Español Airplay chart.)	—	—		Mundial
"—" denotes a recording that did not chart or was not released in that territory.

==== 2010s ====
List of singles released in the 2010s decade as lead artist, showing selected chart positions, certifications, and associated albums
Title	Year	Peak chart positions										Certifications	Album
Title	Year	US	US Latin	US Latin Rhy.	ARG	FRA	GER	ITA	MEX	SPA	SWI	Certifications	Album
"Descontrol"	2010	—	16	1	—	—	—	—	—	—	—		Mundial
"La Despedida"	2010	— (Note: "La Despedida" did not enter the US Billboard Hot 100, but peaked at number 16 on the Bubbling Under Hot 100 chart.)	4	1	—	—	—	—	—	16	—	AMPROFON: Gold	Mundial
"Ven Conmigo" (featuring Prince Royce)	2011	— (Note: "Ven Conmigo" did not enter the US Billboard Hot 100, but peaked at number 15 on the Bubbling Under Hot 100 chart.)	9	2	—	—	—	—	10	—	—		Prestige
"Llegamos a la Disco"	2011	—	—	22	—	—	—	—	—	—	—		Prestige
"Lovumba"	2011	— (Note: "Lovumba" did not enter the US Billboard Hot 100, but peaked at number 23 on the Bubbling Under Hot 100 chart.)	1	1	—	135	—	—	— (Note: "Lovumba" did not enter the Mexico Airplay, but peaked at number 49 on the Mexico Español Airplay chart.)	33	56	FIMI: Gold	Prestige
"Pasarela"	2012	—	4	1	—	—	—	—	—	—	—		Prestige
"Limbo"	2012	— (Note: "Limbo" did not enter the US Billboard Hot 100, but peaked at number 15 on the Bubbling Under Hot 100 chart.)	1	1	—	141	—	17	— (Note: "Limbo" did not enter the Mexico Airplay, but peaked at number 43 on the Mexico Español Airplay chart.)	46	33	FIMI: 2× Platinum; PROMUSICAE: Platinum	Prestige
"Perros Salvajes"	2012	—	—	17	—	—	—	—	—	—	—		Prestige
"El Amante" (featuring J Álvarez)	2013	—	40	22	—	—	—	—	—	—	—		Prestige
"La Noche de los Dos" (featuring Natalia Jiménez)	2013	—	19	4	—	—	—	—	—	—	—		Prestige
"Switchea"	2013	—	—	—	—	—	—	—	—	—	—		Prestige
"La Nueva y la Ex"	2013	—	9	1	—	—	—	—	—	—	—		King Daddy
"Sábado Rebelde" (featuring Plan B)	2014	—	49	—	—	—	—	—	—	—	—		Non-album singles
"Sígueme y Te Sigo"	2015	—	6	1	—	199	—	—	—	12	—	FIMI: Gold; PROMUSICAE: 2× Platinum	Non-album singles
"Vaivén"	2015	—	7	1	—	—	—	—	— (Note: "Vaivén" did not enter the Mexico Airplay, but peaked at number 37 on the Mexico Español Airplay chart.)	19	—	PROMUSICAE: Platinum	Non-album singles
"Shaky Shaky"	2016	88	1	4	—	—	—	—	7	25	—	RIAA: 23× Platinum (Latin); FIMI: Platinum; PROMUSICAE: 2× Platinum	Non-album singles
"Otra Cosa" (with Natti Natasha)	2016	—	21	10	—	—	—	—	—	—	—		Non-album singles
"La Rompe Corazones" (featuring Ozuna)	2017	—	12	4	—	—	—	—	5	8	—	RIAA: 17× Platinum (Latin); FIMI: Gold; PROMUSICAE: 3× Platinum	Non-album singles
"Hula Hoop"	2017	—	30	25	—	—	—	—	— (Note: "Hula Hoop" did not enter the Mexico Airplay, but peaked at number 39 on the Mexico Español Airplay chart.)	70	—	RIAA: 2× Platinum (Latin)	Non-album singles
"Vuelve" (with Bad Bunny)	2017	—	11	—	—	—	—	—	—	17	—	RIAA: 10× Platinum (Latin); PROMUSICAE: 2× Platinum	Non-album singles
"Dura" (Note: The official remix features Bad Bunny, Natti Natasha and Becky G.)	2018	43	2	1	16	79	60	19	6	1	22	RIAA: 43× Platinum (Latin); AMPROFON: 2× Platinum; CAPIF: 3× Platinum; FIMI: 2× Platinum; IFPI SWI: Gold; PROMUSICAE: 4× Platinum; SNEP: Gold	Non-album singles
"Hielo"	2018	—	42	—	—	—	—	—	—	—	—		Non-album singles
"Zum Zum" (with R.K.M & Ken-Y and Arcángel)	2018	—	20	1	60	—	—	—	—	58	—		Non-album singles
"Adictiva" (with Anuel AA)	2018	— (Note: "Adictiva" did not enter the US Billboard Hot 100, but peaked at number 20 on the Bubbling Under Hot 100 chart.)	10	5	5	—	—	—	— (Note: "Adictiva" did not enter the Mexico Airplay, but peaked at number 38 on the Mexico Español Airplay chart.)	4	—	PROMUSICAE: 2× Platinum	Non-album singles
"Con Calma" (Note: The official remix features Katy Perry.) (featuring Snow)	2019	22	1	1	1	7	6	1	1	1	2	RIAA: 41× Platinum (Latin); AMPROFON: 11× Diamond+Platinum; BPI: Gold; BVMI: Platinum; FIMI: 4× Platinum; PROMUSICAE: 6× Platinum; SNEP: Diamond	Non-album singles
"No Lo Trates" (with Pitbull and Natti Natasha)	2019	—	15	1	58	—	—	—	— (Note: "No Lo Trates" did not enter the Mexico Airplay, but peaked at number 18 on the Mexico Español Airplay chart.)	60	74	RIAA: 11× Platinum (Latin); PROMUSICAE: Gold	Libertad 548
"Runaway" (with Sebastián Yatra and Natti Natasha featuring Jonas Brothers)	2019	— (Note: "Runaway" did not enter the US Billboard Hot 100, but peaked at number 11 on the Bubbling Under Hot 100 chart.)	12	1	13	—	—	—	4	29	96	RIAA: 7× Platinum (Latin); AMPROFON: Diamond+2× Platinum; PROMUSICAE: Gold	Dharma
"Si Supieras" (with Wisin & Yandel)	2019	—	15	1	23	—	—	—	—	44	—	RIAA: 6× Platinum (Latin); PROMUSICAE: Platinum	Non-album singles
"Instagram" (with Dimitri Vegas & Like Mike, David Guetta, Afro Bros, and Natti Natasha)	2019	— (Note: "Instagram" did not enter the US Billboard Hot 100, but peaked at number 23 on the Hot Dance/Electronic Songs chart.)	— (Note: "Instagram" did not enter the Hot Latin Songs, but peaked at number 6 on the Latin Digital Song Sales chart.)	—	—	105	29	—	—	—	53	AMPROFON: Platinum; BVMI: Gold; FIMI: Gold; SNEP: Gold	Non-album singles
"China" (with Anuel AA and Karol G featuring Ozuna and J Balvin)	2019	43	1	1	1	47	50	15	1	1	10	RIAA: Gold (Latin); AMPROFON: Diamond+2× Platinum+Gold; FIMI: 2× Platinum; PROMUSICAE: 7× Platinum; SNEP: Gold; AFP: Gold	Emmanuel
"Que Tire Pa Lante"	2019	— (Note: "Que Tire Pa Lante" did not enter the US Billboard Hot 100, but peaked at number 5 on the Bubbling Under Hot 100 chart.)	7	1	1	—	—	—	2	24	—	RIAA: 9× Platinum (Latin); PROMUSICAE: Platinum	Non-album single
"—" denotes a recording that did not chart or was not released in that territory.

==== 2020s ====
List of singles released in the 2020s decade as lead artist, showing selected chart positions, certifications, and associated albums
Title	Year	Peak chart positions										Certifications	Album
Title	Year	US	US Latin	US Latin Air.	US Latin Rhy.	ARG	ITA	MEX	SPA	SWI	WW	Certifications	Album
"Muévelo" (with Nicky Jam)	2020	— (Note: "Muévelo" did not enter the US Billboard Hot 100, but peaked at number 13 on the Bubbling Under Hot 100 chart.)	10	1	1	6	78	8	9	68	—	RIAA: 3× Platinum (Latin); AMPROFON: Platinum+Gold; FIMI: Gold; PROMUSICAE: 2× Platinum	Bad Boys for Life
"Definitivamente" (with Sech)	2020	—	15	1	1	43	—	6	31	—	—	RIAA: 2× Platinum (Latin); PROMUSICAE: Gold	Non-album single
"Pam" (with Justin Quiles and El Alfa)	2020	—	14	3	3	26	—	— (Note: "Pam" did not enter the Mexico Airplay, but peaked at number 23 on the Mexico Español Airplay chart.)	1	—	—	RIAA: 5× Platinum (Latin); PROMUSICAE: 2× Platinum	La Última Promesa
"Bésame" (with Play-N-Skillz and Zion & Lennox)	2020	—	25	4	3	—	—	—	—	—	—	RIAA: 2× Platinum (Latin)	Non-album singles
"Relación" (remix) (with Sech, J Balvin, Rosalía and Farruko)	2020	64	2	1	1	3	73	1	2	47	13	PROMUSICAE: 3× Platinum	Non-album singles
"Don Don" (with Anuel AA and Kendo Kaponi)	2020	—	10	15	12	56	—	—	16	—	101	RIAA: 2× Platinum (Latin); PROMUSICAE: Platinum	Non-album singles
"No Se Da Cuenta" (with Ozuna)	2020	—	35	—	—	99	—	—	69	—	—	PROMUSICAE: Gold	ENOC
"De Vuelta Pa' la Vuelta" (with Marc Anthony)	2020	— (Note: "De Vuelta Pa' la Vuelta" did not enter the US Billboard Hot 100, but peaked at number 19 on the Bubbling Under Hot 100 chart.)	6	1	—	59	—	1	—	—	—		Non-album singles
"Problema"	2021	— (Note: "Problema" did not enter the US Billboard Hot 100, but peaked at number 14 on the Bubbling Under Hot 100 chart.)	9	1	1	23	—	4	52	—	131	RIAA: 4× Platinum (Latin); AMPROFON: 2× Platinum+Gold; PROMUSICAE: Gold	Non-album singles
"El Pony"	2021	—	27	40	21	92	—	—	—	—	—	RIAA: Platinum (Latin)	Non-album singles
"Súbele El Volumen" (with Myke Towers and Jhay Cortez)	2021	—	— (Note: "Súbele El Volumen" did not enter the Hot Latin Songs, but peaked at number 11 on the Latin Digital Song Sales chart.)	23	15	—	—	2	62	—	—		Non-album singles
"Métele Al Perreo"	2021	—	43	4	3	—	—	1	—	—	—	RIAA: Gold (Latin)	Non-album singles
"Sal y Perrea" (remix) (with Sech and J Balvin)	2021	—	14	1	1	47	—	—	—	—	82		Non-album singles
"Rumbatón"	2022	—	19	11	5	82	—	—	11	—	82	PROMUSICAE: 2× Platinum	Legendaddy
"Agua" (with Rauw Alejandro and Nile Rodgers)	2022	—	21	—	—	—	—	— (Note: "Agua" did not enter the Mexico Airplay, but peaked at number 28 on the Mexico Español Airplay chart.)	52	—	— (Note: "Agua" did not enter the US Billboard Global 200, but peaked at number 189 on the Billboard Global Excl. US chart.)		Legendaddy
"Bombón" (with El Alfa and Lil Jon)	2022	—	33	—	—	—	—	—	88	—	—		Legendaddy
"Hot" (with Pitbull)	2022	—	23	25	11	—	—	—	61	—	—		Legendaddy
"Remix"	2022	— (Note: "Remix" did not enter the US Billboard Hot 100, but peaked at number 17 on the Bubbling Under Hot 100 chart.)	13	1	1	—	—	4	38	—	147	RIAA: Platinum (Latin)	Legendaddy
"X Última Vez" (with Bad Bunny)	2022	73	5	44	16	45	—	4	17	—	23	RIAA: 3× Platinum (Latin); PROMUSICAE: Platinum	Legendaddy
"Para Siempre" (with Sech)	2022	—	24	—	—	—	—	—	40	—	—		Legendaddy
"Pasatiempo" (with Myke Towers)	2022	—	28	—	—	—	—	—	28	—	—		Legendaddy
"Mayor Que Usted" (with Natti Natasha and Wisin & Yandel)	2022	—	29	1	1	—	—	1	—	—	—	RIAA: Platinum (Latin)	Nasty Singles
"Ulala" (with Myke Towers)	2022	—	30	1	1	—	—	—	19	—	—	RIAA: 2× Platinum (Latin); PROMUSICAE: 2× Platinum	La Vida Es Una
"Panties y Brasieres" (with Rauw Alejandro)	2023	—	24	8	4	—	—	—	24	—	—	RIAA: 4× Platinum (Latin); PROMUSICAE: Platinum	Saturno
"La Hora y el Día" (with Justin Quiles and Dalex)	2023	—	44	25	9	—	—	—	—	—	—		Non-album single
"Bailar Contigo" (with Black Eyed Peas)	2023	—	—	—	—	—	49	—	—	—	—		Elevation
"Beachy" (with Omar Courtz)	2023	—	— (Note: "Beachy" did not enter the Hot Latin Songs, but peaked at number 22 on the Latin Digital Song Sales chart.)	27	7	—	—	—	—	—	—		Non-album singles
"Yankee 150" (with Yandel and Feid)	2023	—	33	—	—	—	—	—	45	—	177	RIAA: 2× Platinum (Latin); PROMUSICAE: Gold	Non-album singles
"La Baby" (with Tainy, Feid and Sech)	2023	—	47	—	—	—	—	—	36	—	—		Data
"Bonita"	2023	—	— (Note: "Bonita" did not enter the Hot Latin Songs, but peaked at number 7 on the Latin Digital Song Sales chart.)	5	3	—	—	—	—	—	—		Non-album singles
"Donante de Sangre"	2024	— (Note: "Donante de Sangre" did not enter the US Billboard Hot 100, but peaked at number 31 on the Hot Christian Songs chart.)	— (Note: "Donante de Sangre" did not enter the Hot Latin Songs, but peaked at number 6 on the Latin Digital Song Sales chart.)	—	—	—	—	—	—	—	—		Non-album singles
"Loveo"	2024	— (Note: "Loveo" did not enter the US Billboard Hot 100, but peaked at number 14 on the Hot Christian Songs chart.)	— (Note: "Loveo" did not enter the Hot Latin Songs, but peaked at number 3 on the Latin Digital Song Sales chart.)	14	3	—	—	—	—	—	—		Non-album singles
"Bailando en la Lluvia"	2024	— (Note: "Bailando en la Lluvia" did not enter the US Billboard Hot 100, but peaked at number 13 on the Hot Christian Songs chart.)	—	30	8	—	—	—	—	—	—		Non-album singles
"En el Desierto"	2025	—	—	—	—	—	—	—	—	—	—		Non-album singles
"Sonríele"	2025	— (Note: "Sonríele" did not enter the US Billboard Hot 100, but peaked at number 10 on the Hot Christian Songs chart.)	19	1	1	—	—	—	—	—	—		Lamento en Baile
"ABCD" (with Alex Zurdo)	2025	—	—	—	—	—	—	—	—	—	—		Lamento en Baile
"Daddy Yankee: Bzrp Music Sessions, Vol. 0" (with Bizarrap)	2025	— (Note: "Daddy Yankee: Bzrp Music Sessions, Vol. 0/66" did not enter the US Billboard Hot 100, but peaked at number 14 on the Bubbling Under Hot 100 chart.)	11	7	2	8	—	9	2	68	8	PROMUSICAE: 2× Platinum	Non-album single
"Toy Hermoso"	2026	—	—	—	—	—	—	—	—	—	—		Lamento en Baile
"Di Amén" (with Arcángel)	2026	—	—	—	—	—	—	—	—	—	—		La 8va Maravilla
"Botz"	2026	—	20	—	24	—	—	—	—	—	—		La Postal
"Pa Què Llorar" (with Bizarrap)	2026	—	—	—	—	—	—	—	—	—	—		La Postal
"Pokito" (with Diljit Dosanjh)	2026	—	13	—	24	—	—	—	—	—	—		La Postal
"—" denotes a recording that did not chart or was not released in that territory.

=== As featured artist ===
List of singles as featured artist, with selected chart positions and certifications, showing year released and album name
Title	Year	Peak chart positions									Certifications	Album
Title	Year	US	US Latin	US Latin Air.	US Latin Rhy.	FRA	ITA	MEX	SPA	SWI	Certifications	Album
"Los 12 Discípulos" (Eddie Dee featuring various artists) (Note: Eddie Dee featuring Daddy Yankee, Ivy Queen, Tego Calderón, Julio Voltio, Vico C, Zion & Lennox, Nicky Jam, Johnny Prez, Gallego, and Wiso G.)	2004	—	—	—	—	—	—	—	—	—		12 Discípulos
"Oye Mi Canto" (N.O.R.E. featuring Nina Sky, Big Mato, Gem Star and Daddy Yankee)	2004	12	22	—	—	13	29	—	—	—	RIAA: Gold	N.O.R.E. y la Familia...Ya Tú Sabe
"Mayor Que Yo" (Luny Tunes featuring Daddy Yankee, Tony Tun Tun, Baby Ranks, Wisin & Yandel and Héctor el Father)	2005	— (Note: "Mayor Que Yo" did not chart on the Billboard Hot 100 chart, though did peak at number 5 on the Bubbling Under Hot 100 chart.)	3	3	2	—	—	—	—	—		Mas Flow 2
"Drop It on Me" (Ricky Martin featuring Daddy Yankee)	2005	— (Note: "Drop It on Me" did not chart on the Billboard Hot 100 chart, though did peak at number 20 on the Bubbling Under Hot 100 chart.)	—	— (Note: "Drop It on Me" did not enter the Billboard Latin Airplay chart but peaked on the Latin Pop Airplay chart at number 23.)	—	—	—	—	—	—		Life
"Noche de Entierro (Nuestro Amor)" (Luny Tunes featuring Daddy Yankee, Wisin & Yandel, Héctor el Father, Zion and Tony Tun Tun)	2006	— (Note: "Noche de Entierro (Nuestro Amor)" did not chart on the Billboard Hot 100 chart, though did peak at number 23 on the Bubbling Under Hot 100 chart.)	6	6	3	—	—	—	—	—		Mas Flow: Los Benjamins
"Mía" (Tito El Bambino featuring Daddy Yankee)	2006	—	12	12	5	—	—	—	—	—		Top of the Line
"Aprovecha" (Nova & Jory featuring Daddy Yankee)	2012	—	—	—	15	—	—	—	—	—		Mucha Calidad
"More than Friends" (Inna featuring Daddy Yankee)	2013	—	—	—	—	92	52	—	7	—	PROMUSICAE: Gold	Party Never Ends
"Moviendo Caderas" (Yandel featuring Daddy Yankee)	2014	—	10	5	2	—	—	37	27	—	RIAA: 6× Platinum (Latin); AMPROFON: Gold; PROMUSICAE: Platinum	De Líder a Leyenda
"Nota de Amor" (Wisin and Carlos Vives featuring Daddy Yankee)	2015	—	5	1	1	—	—	35	—	—	RIAA: 5× Platinum (Latin); AMPROFON: Gold; PROMUSICAE: Gold	Los Vaqueros: La Trilogía
"We Wanna" (Alexandra Stan and Inna featuring Daddy Yankee)	2015	—	—	—	—	—	60	—	83	—	FIMI: Gold	Alesta, Inna (Note: "We Wanna" was only present on the Turkish, Polish and Mexican versions of Inna.), Unlocked (Note: "We Wanna" was only present on the German version of Unlocked.) and Nirvana (Note: "We Wanna" was only present on the Japanese version of Nirvana.)
"Imaginándote" (Reykon featuring Daddy Yankee)	2015	—	25	14	7	—	—	24	68	—	RIAA: Platinum (Latin); PROMUSICAE: Gold	El Líder
"Fronteamos Porque Podemos" (De la Ghetto featuring Daddy Yankee, Yandel and Ñengo Flow)	2015	—	—	—	— (Note: "Fronteamos Porque Podemos" did not enter the Billboard Latin Rhythm Airplay chart but peaked on the Latin Rhythm Digital Song Sales chart at number 25.)	—	—	—	—	—	RIAA: Platinum (Latin)	Non-album singles
"Mayor Que Yo 3" (Luny Tunes featuring Daddy Yankee, Yandel, Don Omar and Wisin)	2015	—	20	20	8	—	—	—	15	—	PROMUSICAE: 2× Platinum	Non-album singles
"Andas en Mi Cabeza" (Chino & Nacho featuring Daddy Yankee)	2016	—	6	6	—	—	—	— (Note: "Andas en Mi Cabeza" did not chart on the Billboard Mexico Airplay chart, though did peak at number 25 on the Mexico Espanol Airplay chart.)	14	—	RIAA: 15× Platinum (Latin); FIMI: Gold; PROMUSICAE: 4× Platinum	Non-album singles
"No Es Ilegal (Not a Crime)" (Play-N-Skillz featuring Daddy Yankee)	2016	—	21	17	8	—	—	—	71	—	RIAA: Platinum (Latin)	Non-album singles
"A Donde Voy" (Cosculluela featuring Daddy Yankee)	2016	—	27	31	14	—	—	— (Note: "A Donde Voy" did not chart on the Billboard Mexico Airplay chart, though did peak at number 46 on the Mexico Espanol Airplay chart.)	45	—	RIAA: Platinum (Latin); PROMUSICAE: Platinum	Blanco Perla
"Tú y Yo" (Tommy Torres featuring Daddy Yankee)	2016	—	41	27	—	—	—	— (Note: "Tú y Yo" did not chart on the Billboard Mexico Airplay chart, though did peak at number 43 on the Mexico Espanol Airplay chart.)	—	—		Non-album singles
"Sola" (remix) (Anuel AA featuring Farruko, Zion & Lennox, Wisin, and Daddy Yankee)	2016	—	34	—	25	—	—	—	15	—	RIAA: 7× Platinum (Latin); PROMUSICAE: 3× Platinum	Non-album singles
"Despacito" (Luis Fonsi featuring Daddy Yankee) (Note: The official remix features Justin Bieber.)	2017	1	1	1	1	1	1	1	1	1	RIAA: 141× Platinum; FIMI: Diamond; IFPI SWI: Platinum; PROMUSICAE: 13× Platinum; SNEP: Diamond	Vida
"Bella y Sensual" (Romeo Santos featuring Nicky Jam and Daddy Yankee)	2017	95	6	9	6	—	—	12	30	—	RIAA: 6× Platinum (Latin); FIMI: Gold; PROMUSICAE: Platinum	Golden
"La Fórmula" (De La Ghetto featuring Ozuna, Chris Jeday and Daddy Yankee)	2017	—	23	29	14	—	—	— (Note: "La Fórmula" did not chart on the Billboard Mexico Airplay chart, though did peak at number 35 on the Mexico Espanol Airplay chart.)	65	—	RIAA: 3× Platinum (Latin)	Mi Movimiento
"Boom Boom" (RedOne featuring French Montana, Dinah Jane and Daddy Yankee)	2017	—	24	—	—	170	—	30	33	90		Non-album single
"Todo Comienza En La Disco" (Wisin featuring Yandel and Daddy Yankee)	2017	—	16	1	1	—	—	11	72	—		Victory
"Azukita" (Steve Aoki and Play-N-Skillz featuring Elvis Crespo and Daddy Yankee)	2018	— (Note: "Azukita" did not chart on the Billboard Hot 100, but did peak at number 16 on the related Dance/Electronic Songs chart.)	29	31	19	—	95	— (Note: "Azukita" did not chart on the Billboard Mexico Airplay chart, though did peak at number 23 on the Mexico Espanol Airplay chart.)	24	—	RIAA: 2× Platinum (Latin); FIMI: Gold; PROMUSICAE: Platinum	Neon Future III
"Made for Now" (Janet Jackson featuring Daddy Yankee)	2018	88	—	—	—	—	—	1	—	—		Non-album singles
"Como Soy" (Pacho featuring Bad Bunny and Daddy Yankee)	2018	—	39	—	—	—	—	—	99	—	RIAA: 4× Platinum (Latin)	Non-album singles
"Asesina" (remix) (Brytiago and Darell featuring Ozuna, Anuel AA and Daddy Yankee)	2018	— (Note: "Asesina" did not chart on the Billboard Hot 100 chart, though did peak at number 13 on the Bubbling Under Hot 100 chart.)	7	30	16	—	—	— (Note: "Asesina" did not chart on the Billboard Mexico Airplay chart, though did peak at number 30 on the Mexico Espanol Airplay chart.)	—	—	RIAA: 4× Platinum (Latin)	Non-album singles
"Baila, Baila, Baila" (remix) (Ozuna featuring J Balvin, Farruko, Anuel AA and Daddy Yankee)	2019	69	3	1	1	—	—	— (Note: "Baila, Baila, Baila" did not chart on the Billboard Mexico Airplay chart, though did peak at number 32 on the Mexico Espanol Airplay chart.)	—	—		Non-album singles
"Soltera" (remix) (Lunay featuring Bad Bunny and Daddy Yankee)	2019	66	3	1	—	—	61	— (Note: "Soltera" did not chart on the Billboard Mexico Airplay chart, though did peak at number 18 on the Mexico Espanol Airplay chart.)	1	72	PROMUSICAE: 3× Platinum	Non-album singles
"—" denotes a recording that did not chart or was not released in that territory.

== Other charted and promotional songs ==
List of songs, with selected chart positions and certifications, showing year released and album name
Title	Year	Peak chart positions										Certifications	Album
Title	Year	US	US Latin	US Latin Air.	US Latin Rhy.	US Trop.	CHI	ECU	MEX	PER	SPA	Certifications	Album
"Brugal Mix"	2002	—	—	—	—	40	—	—	—	—	—		El Cangri.com
"Yo Voy" (Zion & Lennox featuring Daddy Yankee)	2004	— (Note: "Yo Voy" did not chart on the Billboard Hot 100 chart, though did peak at number 23 on the Bubbling Under Hot 100 chart.)	12	12	3	7	—	—	—	—	—		Motivando a la Yal
"Sabor a Melao" (featuring Andy Montañez)	2004	—	—	—	—	10	—	—	—	—	—		Barrio Fino
"Tu Príncipe" (featuring Zion & Lennox)	2004	—	35	35	17	—	—	—	—	—	—		Barrio Fino
"Aquí Está Tu Caldo"	2005	—	—	—	26	34	—	—	—	—	—		La Trayectoria
"El Taladro" (Eddie Dee featuring Daddy Yankee)	2005	—	—	—	29	22	—	—	—	—	—		12 Discípulos
"Mírame"	2005	—	34	34	14	5	—	—	—	—	—		Mas Flow 2
"Paleta" (Wisin & Yandel featuring Daddy Yankee)	2005	—	31	31	10	39	—	—	—	—	—		Pa'l Mundo
"Intro (Sacala)" (with Wisin & Yandel, Hector "El Father", Naldo, Don Omar and Tego Calderon)	2005	—	36	36	15	11	—	—	—	—	—		Non-album single
"Se Le Ve" (Andy Montañez featuring Daddy Yankee)	2006	—	43	43	—	2	—	—	—	—	—		Salsatón: Salsa con Reggaetón
"Me Enteré" (featuring Tito El Bambino)	2010	—	— (Note: "Me Enteré" did not enter the Hot Latin Songs, but peaked at number 15 on the Billboard Latin Digital Song Sales.)	—	—	—	—	—	—	—	—		Mundial
"Rescate" (Alexis & Fido featuring Daddy Yankee)	2011	—	28	28	6	7	—	—	—	—	—		Perreología
"La Máquina de Baile"	2012	—	42	—	—	—	—	—	—	—	—		Prestige
"Pierde los Modales" (J Balvin featuring Daddy Yankee)	2016	—	— (Note: "Pierde los Modales" did not enter the Hot Latin Songs, but peaked at number 42 on the Billboard Latin Digital Song Sales.)	—	—	—	—	—	—	—	62	PROMUSICAE: Gold	Energia
"No Quiere Enamorarse" (Ozuna featuring Daddy Yankee)	2016	—	35	—	—	—	—	—	—	—	—		Non-album single
"Havana" (remix) (Camila Cabello featuring Daddy Yankee)	2017	—	—	11	—	—	—	—	—	—	16	PROMUSICAE: Gold	Camila
"La Santa" (with Bad Bunny)	2020	53	6	1	1	—	25	14	18	19	7	RIAA: 12× Platinum (Latin); PROMUSICAE: Gold	YHLQMDLG
"Confía" (Sech featuring Daddy Yankee)	2020	—	47	—	—	—	—	—	—	—	—		1 of 1
"Tata" (remix) (with Eladio Carrión and J Balvin)	2021	—	50	—	—	—	—	—	—	—	—		Non-album single
"Campeón"	2022	—	39	—	—	—	—	—	—	—	90		Legendaddy
"Uno Quitao' y Otro Puesto"	2022	—	38	—	—	—	—	—	—	—	97		Legendaddy
"El Abusador del Abusador"	2022	—	45	—	—	—	—	—	—	—	94		Legendaddy
"Zona del Perreo" (with Natti Natasha and Becky G)	2022	—	32	—	—	—	—	—	—	—	73		Legendaddy
"El Toque"	2025	— (Note: "El Toque" did not enter the Billboard Hot 100, but peaked at No. 50 on the Hot Christian Songs.)	—	—	—	—	—	—	—	—	—		Lamento en Baile
"Jezabel y Judas"	2025	— (Note: "Jezabel y Judas" did not enter the Billboard Hot 100, but peaked at No. 27 on the Hot Christian Songs.)	—	—	—	—	—	—	—	—	—		Lamento en Baile
"—" denotes a recording that did not chart or was not released in that territory.

== Other credits ==
Title	Year	Performer(s)	Album	Credit(s)
"Ella Me Conviene"	2010	Zion & Lennox	Los Verdaderos	Songwriting
"Olé"	2014	Yandel	Legacy: De Líder a Leyenda Tour	Songwriting
"Amantes de una Noche"	2018	Natti Natasha and Bad Bunny	Non-album single	Production
"Sin Pijama"	2018	Becky G and Natti Natasha	Mala Santa	Production, songwriting
"Justicia"	2018	Silvestre Dangond and Natti Natasha	Non-album single	Production, songwriting
"Ram Pam Pam"	2021	Natti Natasha and Becky G	Nattividad and Esquemas	Songwriting
"Bailar Contigo"	2022	Black Eyed Peas	Elevation	Songwriting, vocals

== Album appearances ==
- Playero 34: Underground Reggae (1992)
- Playero 35 (1992)
- Playero 36 (1992)
- DJ Eric: The Best (1993)
- Playero 37: Underground (1993)
- Playero 38: Underground

== See also ==
- List of album appearances by Daddy Yankee
- List of best-selling Latin music artists
