= List of album appearances by Daddy Yankee =

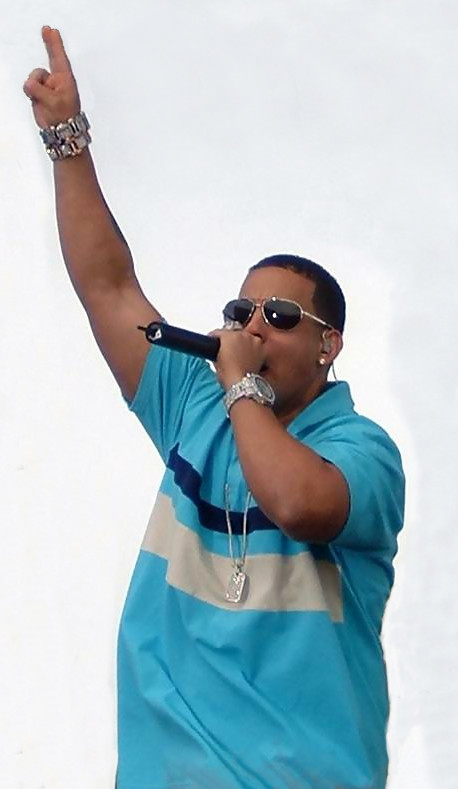
Daddy Yankee performing in the United States during Spring Break 2006.

The following is a list of album appearances by Puerto Rican rapper Daddy Yankee. Only albums that do not have Daddy Yankee as a primary artist are eligible. The Year column indicates the year in which the album was released, not the song. The Album column indicates the first studio album in which the song was part of the track listing. Compilation or Greatest hits albums are eligible only if a song was not included on any studio album.

== List ==
Title	Year	Album	Ref.
"So' Persígueme"	1994	Playero 34	
[Unknown Title]	1994	Playero 36	
"Ragga Moofin Mix" (with Master Joe, DJ Playero, Fellas Rican King, Yaviah, 2 Sweet, and Fat Flavor)	1994	Playero 37	
"No Te Canses / El Funeral"	1994	Playero 38	
"Qué Bien Te Ves"	1995	Playero 39: Respect	
"Camuflash"	1996	Playero 40: New Era	
"Usa La Uzi"	1996	Playero 40: New Era	
"Nunca Lo Olviden"	1996	Playero 40: New Era	
"El Trío" (with Mr. Notty and Yaviah)	1997	The Flow, Vol. 1	
"¿Dónde Están?"	1997	The Flow, Vol. 1	
"Peligro"	1997	DJ Goldy 3: The Melody	
"El Cartel en la Casa" (with Bujuman)	1997	Callejero	
"Te Tiran, Te Tapas"	1997	The Legend	
"A Matar" (with Rey Pirín)	1997	Power Cypha II	
"The Profecy" (with Nas)	1997	Boricua Guerrero	
"Cuida Tu Cuerpo" (with Rey Pirín and Curly Valentino)	1997	Boricua Guerrero	
"Sin Libreta" (with Mr. Notty)	1997	In the House Radio, Vol. 3	
"Todo Hombre Llorando Por Ti"	1998	Gárgolas, Vol. 1: El Comando Ataca	
"Es Evidente"	1998	El Escuadrón del Pánico	
"Intro" (with Mr. Notty, O.G. Black, Maicol, Alberto Stylee, and Rey Pirín)	1998	Tierra de Nadie	
"Que La Enamoren"	1998	Tierra de Nadie	
"Quieren Matarte" (Tito El Bambino featuring Daddy Yankee)	1998	Violencia Musical	
"No Me Dejo Llevar" (with Mr. Notty, Ivy Queen, Nicky Jam, Eddie Dee, Cavalucci, Alberto Stylee, Rey Pirín, and Maicol & Manuel)	1998	No Creemos En Nadie	
"Prepárense Las Yales" (with Rubio & Joel and Nicky Jam)	1998	No Creemos En Nadie	
"Reggae Manía" (with Grupo Manía and Nicky Jam)	1998	The Dynasty	
"Secreto" (Alberto Stylee featuring Daddy Yankee)	1998	Exclusivo	
"Cara de Payaso"	1998	The Industry, Vol. 5: Coming to Attack	
"Knockout"	1999	Gritos de Guerra	
"Calibre de Más Poder"	1999	Gárgolas, Vol. 2: El Nuevo Comando	
"Mujeres Que No Bailen"	1999	La Misión	
"Todas Las Yales"	1999	Playero 41: Past, Present & Future	
"Las Calles de Mi Isla" (D'Mingo featuring Daddy Yankee)	1999	Rumbero Soy	
"No Hacen Na"	2000	Guatauba 2000	
"P.R. All-Stars" (Tony Touch featuring Ivy Queen, Rey Pirín, Don Chezina, Mexicano 777, and Daddy Yankee)	2000	The Piece Maker	
"Desesperado" (with D'Mingo)	2000	Boricuas N.Y.	
"Eres Tú" (with Nicky Jam)	2000	The Flow: Sweet Dreams	
"Puerto Rico Te La Dedico" (with Mr. Notty and Yaviah)	2000	The Flow: Sweet Dreams	
"Yal" (with Nicky Jam)	2000	Abusando	
"Dime Si Estás Ready"	2000	Las 9 Plagas, Vol. 1	
"Para Que Bailen" (Speedy featuring Daddy Yankee)	2001	Haciendo El Amor Con Ropa	
"Yo Sé Que A Ti Te Gusta"	2001	La Conspiración	
"Cuándo y Dónde"	2001	La Conspiración	
"Sábanas Blancas" (with Nicky Jam)	2001	Sandunguero, Vol. 1	
"Rómpela" (Rey Pirín featuring Falo, Nicky Jam, and Daddy Yankee)	2001	Da' Professional	
"Las Gatas" (with Nicky Jam)	2001	Gárgolas, Vol. 3	
"En La Cama" (Nicky Jam featuring Daddy Yankee)	2001	Haciendo Escante	
"Mi Gatita y Yo" (Las Guanabanas featuring Daddy Yankee)	2002	Guillaera	
"Nadie Es Tu Socio En La Brega" (with Wise)	2002	Despertando Conciencia 2	
"El Gran Robo" (Lito MC Cassidy featuring Daddy Yankee)	2002	Mundo Frío	
"Mejor Que Tu Ex"	2002	No Fear 4: Sin Miedo	
"Maúlla" (Yaga & Mackie featuring Daddy Yankee)	2002	Sonando Diferente	
"Me La Explota" (Plan B featuring Daddy Yankee)	2002	El Mundo del Plan B	
"Gata Salvaje" (Héctor & Tito featuring Nicky Jam and Daddy Yankee)	2002	A La Reconquista	
"Aquí Está Tu Caldo"	2003	Blin Blin, Vol. 1	
"Party de Gangsters"	2003	Babilonia: El Imperio Comienza	
"Sentirte" (with Nicky Jam)	2003	Sandunguero, Vol. 2	
"Buscarte" (Nicky Jam featuring Daddy Yankee)	2003	Salón de la Fama	
"La Noche Está Buena" (Don Omar featuring Daddy Yankee)	2003	The Last Don	
"Cógela Que Va Sin Jockey"	2003	Más Flow	
"Los 12 Discípulos" (Eddie Dee featuring Gallego, Vico C, Tego Calderón, Julio Voltio, Ivy Queen, Zion & Lennox, Nicky Jam, Johnny Prez, Wiso G, and Daddy Yankee)	2004	12 Discípulos	
"Donde Hubo Fuego / Pa'Tras, Pa'Lante"	2004	12 Discípulos	
"Saoco" (Wisin featuring Daddy Yankee)	2004	El Sobreviviente	
"Yo Voy" (Zion & Lennox featuring Daddy Yankee)	2004	Motivando a la Yal	
"Se Activaron Los Anormales" (Divino featuring Daddy Yankee)	2004	Todo A Su Tiempo	
"La Matadora" (Mikey Perfecto featuring Tommy Viera and Daddy Yankee)	2004	Evolución Arrestada	
"Machete"	2004	Los Anormales	
"Mayor Que Yo" (Luny Tunes featuring Baby Ranks, Tony Tun Tun, Wisin & Yandel, Héctor el Father, and Daddy Yankee)	2005	Más Flow 2	
"Mírame"	2005	Más Flow 2	
"Taladro" (Eddie Dee featuring Daddy Yankee)	2005	12 Discípulos: Special Edition	
"A Romper La Disco" (Tommy Viera featuring Daddy Yankee)	2005	Sangre Nueva	
"Drop It On Me" (Ricky Martin featuring Daddy Yankee)	2005	Life	
"Paleta" (Wisin & Yandel featuring Daddy Yankee)	2005	Pa'l Mundo	
"Rah Rah" (Remix) (Pitbull featuring Elephant Man and Daddy Yankee)	2005	Money is Still a Major Issue	
"Mía" (Tito El Bambino featuring Daddy Yankee)	2006	Top of the Line	
"Se Le Ve" (Andy Montañez featuring Daddy Yankee)	2006	Salsa con Reggaetón	
"Oye Mi Canto" (N.O.R.E. featuring Nina Sky, Big Mato, Gem Star, and Daddy Yankee)	2006	N.O.R.E. y la Familia...Ya Tú Sabe	
"Dímelo" (N.O.R.E. featuring Daddy Yankee)	2006	N.O.R.E. y la Familia...Ya Tú Sabe	
"Royal Rumble (Se Van)" (with Wise, Zion, Wisin, Héctor el Father, Yomo, Franco El Gorila, Don Omar, Arcángel, and Alexis)	2006	Más Flow: Los Benjamins	
"Noche de Entierro (Nuestro Amor)" (Luny Tunes featuring Tony Tun Tun, Wisin & Yandel, Héctor el Father, and Daddy Yankee)	2006	Más Flow: Los Benjamins	
"Me Matas" (Remix) (R.K.M. & Ken-Y featuring Daddy Yankee)	2007	Masterpiece: Commemorative Edition	
"Caliente"	2007	Invasión	
"Al Son del Boom" (Miguelito featuring Daddy Yankee)	2007	El Heredero	
"Controlando El Área" (with Bounty Killer)	2008	Caribbean Connection	
"Algo Musical" (Remix) (Ñejo & Dalmata featuring Arcángel and Daddy Yankee)	2008	Broke & Famous: Still Broke	
"Talento de un Barrio Fino" (Tempo featuring Daddy Yankee)	2009	Free Tempo	
"Yo Tengo Una Gata" (Zion & Lennox featuring De La Ghetto, Yomo, Arcángel, Plan B, Alexis, Yaviah, Ángel Doze, Franco El Gorila, Jadiel, and Daddy Yankee)	2009	Pa' La Calle	
"Quiero Decirte" (Arcángel featuring Daddy Yankee)	2010	The Problem Child	
"Perdido Por El Mundo" (Zion & Lennox featuring Daddy Yankee)	2010	Los Verdaderos	
"Rescate" (Alexis & Fido featuring Daddy Yankee)	2011	Perreología	
"Chequea Cómo Se Siente" (Tito El Bambino featuring Daddy Yankee)	2011	Invencible	
"Aprovecha" (Nova & Jory featuring Daddy Yankee)	2011	Mucha Calidad	
"Vuelve" (Carnal featuring Farruko and Daddy Yankee)	2011	Carnal	
"Guaya" (with Arcángel)	2012	El Imperio Nazza	
"Llégale" (with Gotay)	2012	El Imperio Nazza	
"Soldados" (with Barrington Levy and Ñengo Flow)	2012	El Imperio Nazza	
"Pikete" (Farruko featuring Daddy Yankee)	2012	The Most Powerful Rookie	
"La Dupleta" (with Arcángel)	2012	El Imperio Nazza: Gold Edition	
"Comienza El Bellaqueo"	2012	El Imperio Nazza: Gold Edition	
"Explosión" (with Farruko and J Álvarez)	2012	El Imperio Nazza: Gold Edition	
"Finally Found You" (Remix) (Enrique Iglesias featuring Daddy Yankee)	2012	Sex and Love	
"Pa' Eso Estoy Yo" (Gotay featuring Daddy Yankee)	2012	El Imperio Nazza: Gotay Edition	
"Llevo Tras de Ti" (Arcángel and Plan B featuring Daddy Yankee)	2012	La Fórmula	
"Nos Matamos Bailando" (J Álvarez featuring Daddy Yankee)	2012	El Imperio Nazza: J Álvarez Edition	
"Mucha Soltura" (Jowell & Randy featuring Daddy Yankee)	2013	El Imperio Nazza: Doxis Edition	
"Junto al Amanecer" (Remix) (J Álvarez featuring Daddy Yankee)	2013	La Buya, Vol. 1	
"Una Nena" (Farruko featuring Daddy Yankee)	2013	El Imperio Nazza: Farruko Edition	
"More Than Friends" (Inna featuring Daddy Yankee)	2013	Party Never Ends	
"Moviendo Caderas" (Yandel featuring Daddy Yankee)	2013	De Líder a Leyenda	
"Bien Cómodo" (featuring Randy, Jory, Yaga & Mackie, Baby Rasta & Gringo, Arcángel, Guelo Star, and J Álvarez)	2013	Los de la Nazza: The Collection, Vol. 1	
"Guillao" (Farruko featuring Daddy Yankee)	2013	Los de la Nazza: The Collection, Vol. 1	
"Pa' Romper La Discoteca" (Remix) (Farruko featuring Yomo, Zion & Lennox, and Daddy Yankee)	2013	Los de la Nazza: The Collection, Vol. 1	
"Gatas, Bocinas y Bajo" (Farruko featuring Daddy Yankee)	2013	Los de la Nazza: The Collection, Vol. 1	
"Pakas de 100" (Arcángel featuring Daddy Yankee)	2013	Sentimiento, Elegancia & Maldad	
"Adicto al Dinero Fácil" (Tempo featuring Daddy Yankee)	2013	Free Music	
"Igual Que Ayer"	2014	El Imperio Nazza: Top Secret	
"Dime Qué Pasó" (featuring Arcángel)	2014	El Imperio Nazza: Top Secret	
"Born to Rule"	2014	Catch the Throne, Vol. 1	
"Otro Amanecer" (D.Ozi featuring Daddy Yankee)	2014	El Suero de la Calle	
"A Que No Te Atreves" (Remix) (Tito El Bambino featuring Chencho, Yandel, and Daddy Yankee)	2014	Alta Jerarquía	
"Mi Sueño" (Pacho & Cirilo featuring Daddy Yankee)	2015	Los Alqaedas, Vol. 3	
"Yo Soy de Aquí" (Don Omar featuring Yandel, Arcángel, and Daddy Yankee)	2015	The Last Don II	
"Tírate al Medio" (Don Omar featuring Daddy Yankee)	2015	The Last Don II	
"Nota de Amor" (Wisin and Carlos Vives featuring Daddy Yankee)	2015	Los Vaqueros: La Trilogía	
"We Wanna" (Alexandra Stan and Inna featuring Daddy Yankee)	2015	Unlocked	
"Cazería de Nenotas" (Remix) (Clandestino & Yailemm featuring Amaro, Plan B, Pinto, Pusho, Tito El Bambino, and Daddy Yankee)	2015	Equilibrium	
"A Donde Voy" (Cosculluela featuring Daddy Yankee)	2016	Blanco Perla	
"Pierde Los Modales" (J Balvin featuring Daddy Yankee)	2016	Energía	
"Cierra Los Ojos" (Zion & Lennox featuring Daddy Yankee)	2016	Motivan2	
"Firehouse" (with Play-N-Skillz)	2016	ZIN 66	
"Hasta El Amanecer" (Remix) (Nicky Jam featuring Daddy Yankee)	2017	Fénix	
"Tu Hombre" (Nicky Jam featuring Daddy Yankee)	2017	Fénix	
"Probando" (Cosculluela featuring Daddy Yankee)	2017	Los de la Nazza: The Collection, Vol. 3	
"Manual de Trucos"	2017	ZIN 69	
"Bella y Sensual" (Romeo Santos featuring Nicky Jam and Daddy Yankee)	2017	Golden	
"Todo Comienza En La Disco" (Wisin featuring Yandel and Daddy Yankee)	2017	Victory	
"Bailar Contigo" (Black Eyed Peas with Daddy Yankee)	2022	Elevation	

== See also ==
- Daddy Yankee discography
