= El Disco Duro =

Unreleased studio album by Daddy Yankee

Studio album (unreleased) by Daddy Yankee
- Recorded: 2014–2019
- Genres: Reggaeton; hip hop; Latin pop; Latin trap
- Label: El Cartel
- Producers: Chris Jeday; Gaby Music; Jumbo; Los Evo Jedis

Singles from El Disco Duro
- 1. "Sígueme y Te Sigo" Released: March 12, 2015; 2. "Vaivén" Released: September 17, 2015; 3. "Shaky Shaky" Released: April 8, 2016; 4. "Otra Cosa" Released: December 9, 2016; 5. "La Rompe Corazones" Released: January 6, 2017; 6. "Vuelve" Released: September 29, 2017; 7. "Dura" Released: January 18, 2018

El Disco Duro (Spanish for "The Hard Album" or, more literally "The Hard Drive") is an unreleased and later cancelled studio album by Puerto Rican rapper Daddy Yankee. It was originally scheduled to be released during early 2017 under its original title King Daddy II: Elemento DY, a sequel to his previous album King Daddy, produced by Los de la Nazza, a production duo that worked with Daddy Yankee from 2007 to 2014. The album was to include "Sígueme y Te Sigo", "Vaivén" and "Shaky Shaky" as singles, which were released between March 2015 and April 2016.

== Background ==
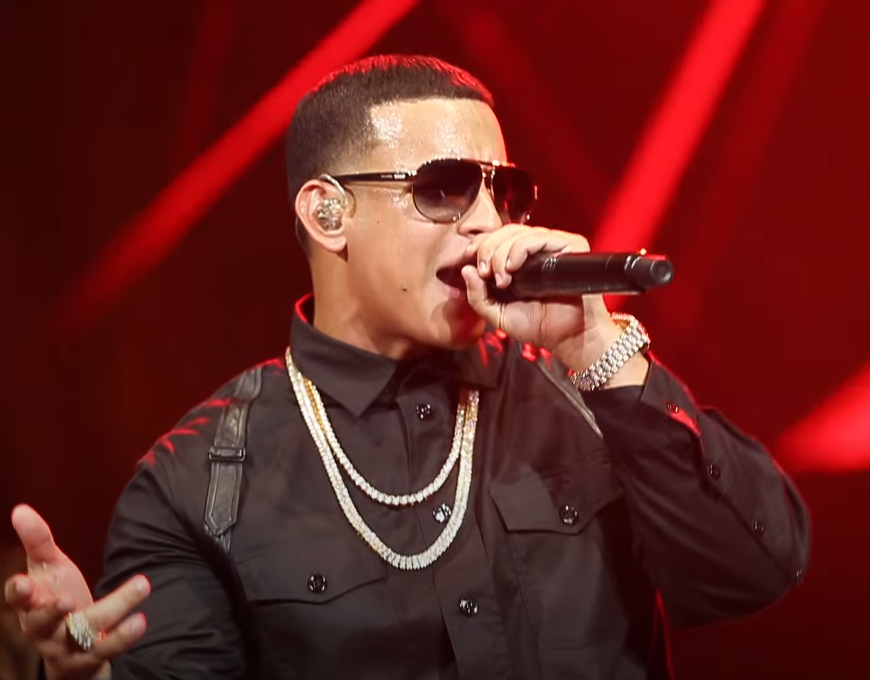
Daddy Yankee in 2015.

El Disco Duro (originally titled King Daddy II: Elemento DY) was going to be the sequel of his previous mixtape King Daddy, released in October 2013, which became the first digital-only Latin album that managed to rank within the top 10 on the US Top Latin Albums chart. Two months after the release of King Daddy, Daddy Yankee announced that there was going to be a physical version of the album, with exclusive bonus tracks, planned to be released during 2014, but it was not published after all.

The Puerto Rican production duo Los de la Nazza, which had been working with Daddy Yankee since 2007, left El Cartel Records and stopped being his main producers in order to focus on their careers. Chris Jeday and Gaby Music were hired as the album's main producers during late 2014. El Disco Duro was officially announced during mid-2014 as King Daddy II with the promotion of the single "Sábado Rebelde" featuring Puerto Rican duo Plan B, released on October 31.

On September 10, 2016, he was urgently moved to a nearby hospital in Cali, Colombia, where he was set to perform later that night. Daddy Yankee suffered a rise in blood pressure, hypoglycemia and dehydration, which almost caused him to suffer a heart attack before being treated by doctors. His condition improved and he was sent to rest in his native Puerto Rico, but had to cancel other concerts in Colombia. On October 19, he confirmed that his hypoglycemia worsened and turned into a prediabetes.

In January 2017, he was featured on the reggaeton-pop single "Despacito" by Puerto Rican singer Luis Fonsi. The song was a worldwide success, topping the charts of 45 countries, including a number 1 spot on the Billboard Hot 100, the first for a primarily Spanish-language song since "Macarena" by Los del Río in 1996. The success of the song led Daddy Yankee to become the most listened artist worldwide on the streaming service Spotify on July 9, 2017, being the first Latin artist to do so.

In March 2017, Daddy Yankee announced a global partnership with Zumba Fitness, in which he would record exclusive tracks for the Zumba Instructor Network. On March 15, 2017, Daddy Yankee was recognized as Artist/Songwriter of the Year by the American Society of Composers, Authors and Publishers during the 25th Annual ASCAP Latin Music Awards. A day later, he received a Puerto Rican Walk of Fame Star in San Juan, becoming the first urban act to do so.

== Composition ==
"Sígueme y Te Sigo" is a dance love song written by Daddy Yankee, Chris Jeday and Luis "Wichi" Ortíz Rivera, inspired by social networks but not centred on them, and mixes reggaeton with Latin pop, including an electric guitar riff.

"Vaivén" is a moombahton song written by Daddy Yankee, Luis "Wichi" Ortíz Rivera and the producer Chris Jeday.

"Shaky Shaky" is a reggaeton song born as a freestyle during early December 2015, and was later recorded by the production duo Los Evo Jedis. According to Daddy Yankee, the main vocals were recorded in one take and the song musically mixes sounds from old and new school reggaeton. The keyboard bass line was based on the one from the single "Murder She Wrote" by Chaka Demus & Pliers, released in 1992. It also includes a repeating sample of a horse's neigh from Mel and Tim's "Good Guys Only Win in the Movies" (1970), which became popular after Cypress Hill's "Insane in the Brain" (1993).

"Otra Cosa" features Dominican singer Natti Natasha and is a fusion between reggaeton, dancehall and moombahton music written by Daddy Yankee, Natti Natasha and Puerto Rican producer Haze. The lyrics are about lovesickness. The concept of the song was brought to Daddy Yankee by Haze and Natti Natasha in order to be included on the track listing of La Super Fórmula, a Pina Records studio album by various artists.

"La Rompe Corazones" features Puerto Rican singer Ozuna and was written by Daddy Yankee, Ozuna, Chris Jeday and Puerto Rican songwriter Jesús "Benny Benni" Benitez Hiraldo. The song tells the story of a lovesick woman who no longer trusts her relationships, taking revenge on other men through her frustration.

"Dura" is a Reggaeton song released on January 18, 2018. "Dura" and its music video, directed by Carlos Pérez, filmed in Los Angeles and based on 1990s style and visuals. The song was written by Daddy Yankee, Juan Rivera, Luis Romero, and Urbani Mota, and was produced by Los Evo Jedis. A remix version featuring Becky G, Bad Bunny and Natti Natasha was released on April 27, 2018.

== Production ==
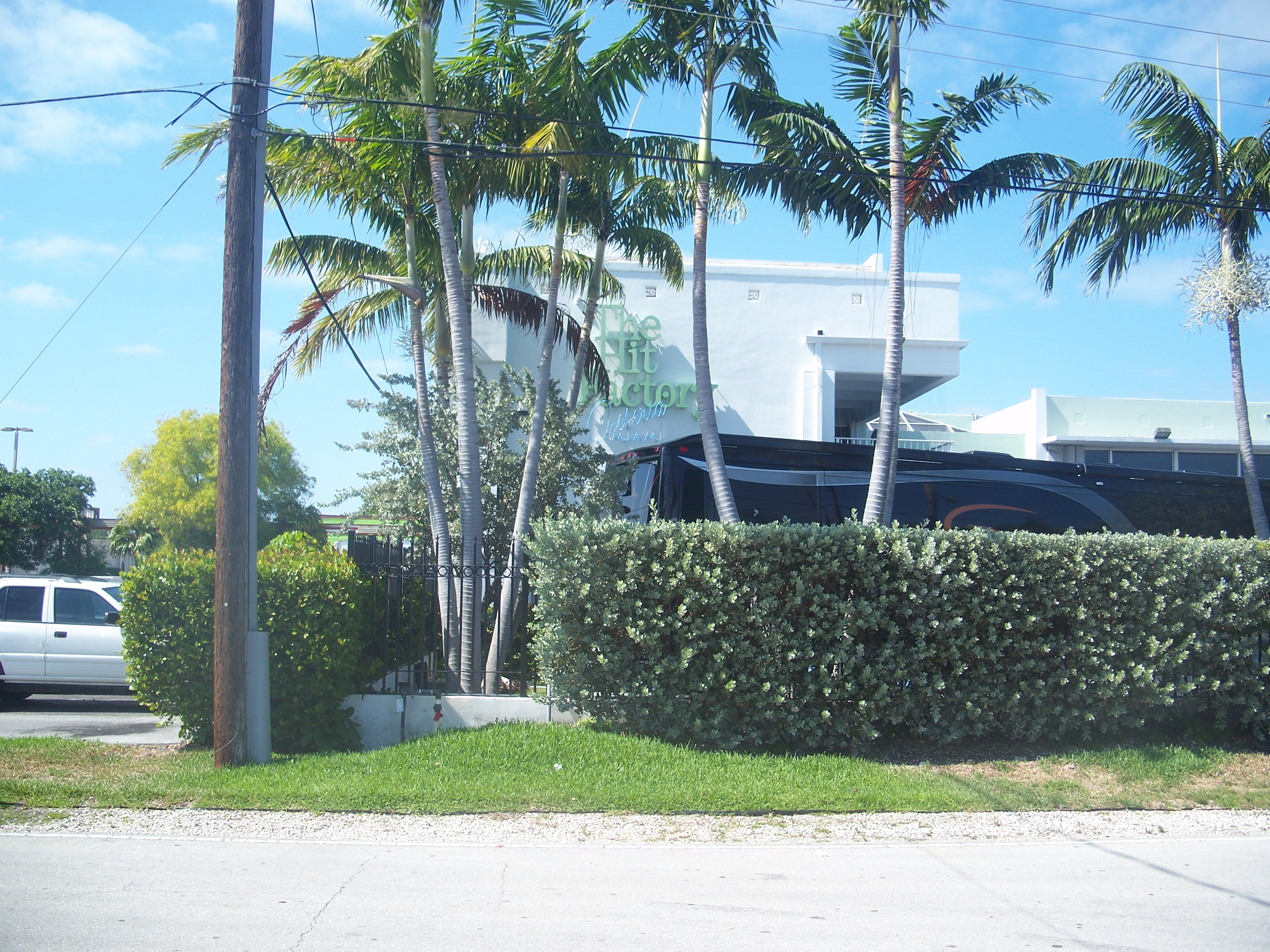
Criteria Studios was one of various studios the album was recorded at.

The first known recording session for El Disco Duro with producers Chris Jeday and Gaby Music was held in December 2014. The last known session was carried out in May 2017 with the recording of the track "Percocet". The recording was resumed during mid-October 2016 with Daddy Yankee and Dominican singer Natti Natasha recording the single "Otra Cosa" for Pina Records' upcoming studio album La Super Fórmula. However, Daddy Yankee managed to include the track on El Disco Duro during December 2016. On February 21, 2017, Daddy Yankee uploaded an image on his official Instagram account listening to the album.

Studios where the album was recorded includes Daddy Yankee's El Cartel Studios in Santurce, San Juan, Puerto Rico, Chris Jeday's Music Capos Studios in Puerto Rico, Criteria Studios in Miami, Florida, USA, and Master House Studios in Doral, Florida, USA.

"Sígueme y Te Sigo" was mixed at El Cartel Studios in February 2015. Sound test for "Vaivén" was held by Chris Jeday at Music Capos Studios during early August 2015. The song was later mixed at Criteria Studios and at El Cartel Studios the same month.

== Release ==
Daddy Yankee confirmed on October 26, 2016 during a meeting with Zumba fitness creator Beto Perez at Pina Records that El Disco Duro will be released during early 2017, most likely during January or February. On June 21, 2017, Daddy Yankee stated that he postponed the album's release due to finding more successful the release of singles instead of an entire record. In December 2014, Billboard magazine added digital and streaming information to count sales: 1,000 digital songs sales and 1,500 song streams separately equal one album sale, which may affect the chart placement of the album. Considered on-demand audio services includes Spotify, Google Play, Beats Music and Xbox Music.

=== Singles ===
"Sígueme y Te Sigo" was released as the first single on March 12, 2015. It peaked at number 6 on the US Hot Latin Songs chart on June 13, 2015 and at number 5 on Tropical Songs on April 18, 2015. Internationally, the song peaked at number 12 in Spain, at number 32 in Venezuela, and at number 198 in France. It was certified 2× platinum by the PROMUSICAE, platinum by the IFPI Chile, and gold by the FIMI.

"Vaivén" was released as the second single on September 17, 2015. Although the song does not have an official music video, it managed to peak at number 7 on the US Hot Latin Songs chart and at number 3 on Tropical Songs, both on January 23, 2016. Internationally, the single reached number 19 in Spain and number 34 in Venezuela. It received a platinum certification by the PROMUSICAE and the IFPI Chile.

"Shaky Shaky" was released as the third single on April 8, 2016, although it was originally planned as a gift from Yankee to his fans for 2015 Christmas. The song reached the number 1 spot on the US Hot Latin Songs and Tropical Songs charts on November 5 and August 20, 2016, respectively. It became his fourth No. 1 song on the Hot Latin Songs chart and his first one since February 2013. It also peaked at number 88 in the United States, becoming Daddy Yankee's first entry on the Hot 100 since the debut of "Impacto" on May 26, 2007. Internationally, the song peaked at number 1 in Mexico and the Dominican Republic, at number 4 in Colombia, at number 11 in Guatemala, at number 14 in Uruguay, at number 25 in Spain, and at number 42 in Venezuela. It was certified 2× platinum by the PROMUSICAE and the CAPIF, platinum by the IFPI Chile, and gold by the FIMI.

==== Other releases ====
"Sábado Rebelde" was released as a promotional song on October 31, 2014. It features reggaeton duo Plan B and was written by Daddy Yankee, Plan B, and the producer Haze. It peaked at number 49 on the US Hot Latin Songs chart on February 28, 2015.

"Alerta Roja" was released as a promotional song on Daddy Yankee's birthday on February 3, 2016 as a gift to his fans. The song's concept was to include some of the most popular Latin urban artists. Singers Osmani García and J Álvarez (Cuban and Puerto Rican, respectively) were originally guest artists but their verses were not included in the song. J Álvarez stated not knowing about being out of it and manifested his anger with Daddy Yankee through his social networks. Two weeks later, Álvarez said that he was not aware of the song's concept and also that his anger was caused by a misunderstanding.

"Otra Cosa" was released as a promotional single on December 9, 2016 and features Natti Natasha. The song was released as the first single of Pina Records' upcoming studio album, La Súper Fórmula, but Daddy Yankee managed to also include it on El Disco Duro. The single peaked at number 21 on the US Hot Latin Songs chart on February 18, 2017 and at number 17 on Tropical Songs on January 14, 2017. The song also peaked at number 50 in Venezuela.

"La Rompe Corazones" was released as a promotional single on January 6, 2017 as a gift from Daddy Yankee to his fans because of Three Kings' Day. The song peaked at number 12 on the US Hot Latin Songs chart on July 22, 2017. Internationally, the single peaked at number 2 in Peru, at number 8 in Spain and Mexico, and at number 11 in Paraguay. It was certified 2× platinum by the PROMUSICAE and gold by the CAPIF.

"Hula Hoop" was released as a promotional single on March 3, 2017, originally recorded exclusively for Zumba fitness. The song was based on the "hula hoop" hook from the remix of "Shaky Shaky" by Daddy Yankee, Nicky Jam and Plan B. It peaked at number 30 on the US Hot Latin Songs chart on March 25, 2017. Internationally, it reached number 9 in Chile, number 18 in Venezuela, number 20 in Colombia, and number 75 in Spain.

== Accolades ==
Publication	Accolade	Recipient	Year	Rank	Ref.
Latin Times	The 15 Most Addicting Latin Songs of 2015	"Sígueme y Te Sigo"	2015	5	
NBC News	10 Top Latino Songs to Get You Moving	"Shaky Shaky"	2016	1	
Billboard	Best Latin Dance Songs of 2016	"Shaky Shaky"	2016	1	
PopSugar	30 Songs That Pretty Much Defined Latin Music in 2016	"Shaky Shaky"	2016	19	

"Sígueme y Te Sigo" received a Latin American Music Award for Favorite Urban Song at the 1st Latin American Music Awards. It was nominated for Latin Grammy Awards for Best Urban Song and Best Urban Performance at the 16th Latin Grammy Awards.

"Vaivén" was nominated for an International Dance Music Award for Best Latin Dance Track at the 31st International Dance Music Awards and for a Lo Nuestro Award for Urban Song of the Year at the 29th Lo Nuestro Awards.

"Shaky Shaky" received a Premio Juventud for Best Song for Dancing at the 14th Premios Juventud. It was nominated for Billboard Latin Music Awards for Hot Latin Song of the Year and Streaming Song of the Year at the 24th Billboard Latin Music Awards. It also received a Top Latin Song nomination at the 24th Billboard Music Awards.

== Track listing ==
The following table is in order of release and is not the official track listing. Some songs may not appear on the final album.

No.	Title	Writer(s)	Producer(s)	Length
1.	"Sábado Rebelde" (featuring Plan B)	Ramón Ayala; Orlando Valle; Edwin Vázquez; Egbert Rosa	Haze; Duran	4:00
2.	"Sígueme y Te Sigo"	R. Ayala; Carlos Ortíz; Luis Ortíz	Chris Jeday; Gaby Music	3:27
3.	"Vaivén"	R. Ayala; C. Ortíz; L. Ortíz	Chris Jeday; Gaby Music	3:45
4.	"Alerta Roja" (featuring Zion, Nicky Jam, Arcángel, De La Ghetto, Kafu Banton, Plan B, J Balvin, Farruko, Cosculluela, El Micha, Brytiago, Alexio, Mozart La Para, Secreto and Gente de Zona)	R. Ayala; Nick Rivera; Austin Santos; Rafael Castillo; Zico Garibaldi; O. Valle; E. Vázquez; José Osorio; Carlos Reyes; José Cosculluela; Michael Sierra; Bryan Santiago; Victor Rivera; Erickson Fernandez; Odalis Pérez; Alexander Delgado; Randy Martínez	Chris Jeday; Gaby Music; Jumbo	10:23
5.	"Shaky Shaky"	R. Ayala; Urbani Mota; Luis Romero	Los Evo Jedis	3:52
6.	"Otra Cosa" (featuring Natti Natasha)	R. Ayala; Natalia Gutiérrez; E. Rosa	Haze	3:28
7.	"La Rompe Corazones" (featuring Ozuna)	R. Ayala; Juan Carlos Ozuna; C. Ortíz; Jesús Benitez	Chris Jeday; Gaby Music	3:19
8.	"Código de Amor" (featuring Karol G; unreleased, announced in December 2015)
9.	"Tranque" (featuring Lito & Polaco; unreleased, announced in February 2016)
10.	"Exagerao" (featuring Zion & Lennox; unreleased, announced in March 2016)
11.	"Percocet" (Unreleased; announced in May 2016)
12.	"Untitled track" (featuring Brytiago; unreleased, announced in October 2016)
13.	"Untitled bachatón track" (Unreleased; announced in October 2016)
14.	"Auxilio" (Unreleased; announced in October 2016)
