= Dura (song) =

2018 single by Daddy Yankee

Single by Daddy Yankee

from the album El Disco Duro
- Language: Spanish
- English title: "Hot" (Note: The word "dura" (Spanish for "hard") refers to "hot" in the context of the song.)
- Released: January 18, 2018
- Genre: Reggaeton
- Length: 3:20
- Label: El Cartel
- Songwriters: Ramón Ayala; Juan Rivera; Luis Romero; Urbani Mota
- Producer: Los Evo Jedis

Daddy Yankee singles chronology
"Boom Boom" (2017)	"Dura" (2018)	"Azukita" (2018)

Music video
- "Dura" on YouTube

"Dura" (Latin American Spanish: [du.ɾa]; English: "Hot") is a single by Puerto Rican rapper Daddy Yankee from his upcoming studio album El Disco Duro. On January 18, 2018, El Cartel Records released "Dura" and its music video, directed by Carlos Pérez, filmed in Los Angeles and based on 1990s style and visuals. The song was written by Daddy Yankee, Juan Rivera, Luis Romero, and Urbani Mota, and was produced by Los Evo Jedis. A remix version featuring Becky G, Bad Bunny and Natti Natasha was released on April 27, 2018.

The single has been described as an uptempo reggaeton track with reggae influences and lyrics about a good looking woman. Commercially, the song topped the charts of 14 countries and reached the top 10 of five others. In the United States, "Dura" peaked at number 43 on the Billboard Hot 100 and at number two on the Hot Latin Songs chart. The track garnered Daddy Yankee his first Latin Grammy Award for Best Urban Song at the 19th Latin Grammy Awards.

== Background ==
"Dura" was written by Daddy Yankee, Juan Rivera Vázquez ("Gaby Music"), Luis "Rome" Romero, and Urbani Mota Cedeño ("DJ Urba"), and was produced by Puerto Rican production duo Los Evo Jedis, composed by DJ Urba and Rome, who had previously worked with Daddy Yankee on "Shaky Shaky" (2016).

On January 4, 2018, Suzette Fernandez of Billboard announced that Daddy Yankee's first single of 2018 would be "a new song called 'Dura'", scheduled to be released on the same month. The following day, Daddy Yankee posted on his Instagram account that he was "putting the finishing touches to [his] new single" and that "January will be interesting." According to Daddy Yankee, it is "an amusing song" that includes "reggae and old schools sounds, and melts with the current musical influence." He wrote on an Instagram post that "the modern and the retro world collide on a song" and that it was inspired by his musical influences from the beginnings of his career. He also stated that the track "harks back to the rhythm and nostalgia for music of the late 1980s and early 1990s, that essence of reggae that inspired reggaeton."

Shortly after the release of the single, Daddy Yankee initiated a campaign on Instagram named #DuraChallenge, encouraging fans to film themselves dancing to the track. Puerto Rican newspaper Primera Hora reported that #DuraChallenge has inspired more than 82,000 Instagram videos as of March 6, 2018, starred by "aspiring dancers, children, top class models, and people of the Third Age."

== Composition ==
"Dura" is an uptempo reggaeton song with a length of three minutes and twenty seconds, and uses 50s progression. Billboard's Marjua Estevez described the lyrics as "a tender-yet-thirsty ode to the girl Daddy's got his eyes on." She wrote about the song as "Daddy Yankee [kicking] it old-school while singing praises to a love jones." Estevez also clarified that the word "dura" (Spanish for "hard") refers to "a way of saying someone looks hot" in the context of the song.

== Release and reception ==
"Dura" was made available for digital download on January 18, 2018, by El Cartel Records under exclusive license to Universal Music Latin. Due to the song having been filtered on the Internet, Daddy Yankee was forced to release it ahead of schedule.

Writing for Billboard, Suzette Fernandez described "Dura" as a track that "takes you back to the old reggaeton." An editor of The Straits Times stated that the song "returns to early reggaeton without the pop melodies that mega-stars such as Shakira, Enrique Iglesias or 'Despacito' co-writer Luis Fonsi deployed to bring the genre to the Anglo pop world." Writing for Cosmopolitan France, Loïse Delacotte described the song as having a "fast and nagging rhythm, dancing, viral choreography, a 90s-style pop music video, and lyrics relatively easy to memorize," and also added that "you will love and then hate it."

=== Accolades ===
Ceremony	Date	Category	Result
Billboard Latin Music Awards	April 25, 2019	Hot Latin Song of the Year	Nominated
Billboard Latin Music Awards	April 25, 2019	Airplay Song of the Year	Nominated
Billboard Latin Music Awards	April 25, 2019	Digital Song of the Year	Won
Billboard Latin Music Awards	April 25, 2019	Streaming Song of the Year	Nominated
Billboard Latin Music Awards	April 25, 2019	Latin Rhythm Song of the Year	Nominated
Latin Grammy Awards	November 15, 2018	Best Urban Song	Won

== Commercial performance ==
In the United States, the single peaked at number two on the US Hot Latin Songs chart on March 10, 2018, becoming Daddy Yankee's 15th top five and 23rd top 10 title on the list. The song also peaked at number 43 on the Billboard Hot 100 on May 15, 2018, becoming his ninth entry and fifth highest peak on the chart. It also peaked at number one on the US Latin Digital Songs and Latin Airplay charts, and at number three on the US Latin Streaming Songs chart. "Dura" was the second best-selling and third most-streamed Latin song of the first half of 2018, with 120,000 downloads sold and 198,437,000 audio and video streams. It was the third best-performing single of 2018 on the Hot Latin Songs chart, being the highest-ranking track of those released during that year.

Internationally, the song topped the charts of Argentina, Bolivia, Chile, Dominican Republic, Ecuador, El Salvador, Guatemala, Honduras, Nicaragua, Panama, Paraguay, Peru, Spain, and Venezuela, and reached the top 10 in Colombia, Costa Rica, Mexico, the Netherlands, and Uruguay. It also achieved moderate success in Austria, Belgium, Canada, France, Germany, Hungary, Italy, Portugal, Slovakia, and Switzerland. It was the most played song in Latin America on the weeks ending on March 4, 2018, and March 11, 2018, with 13,350 and 13,956 spins across the 18 countries and 700 Hispanic radio stations Monitor Latino measure, respectively.

== Music video ==
The music video for "Dura" was directed by Puerto Rican director Carlos Pérez. The filming took place in Los Angeles. The director had previously worked with Daddy Yankee on clips including "Gasolina" (2004), "Rompe" (2005), and "Despacito" (2017). According to a press release by Spanish news agency EFE, the clip "tries to project over the top fashion images, an individualistic dance style and beautiful and sincere personalities." EFE stated that, as the video progresses, it "becomes a wake-up call for women to reclaim their space on the dance floor and within society itself." Daddy Yankee stated on an Instagram post that "we wanted to use the bright colors that predominated the 80s and early 90s. Alongside the stylist and the director we wanted to recreate that era and also search the contrast with today's style trends." The visual premiered through Daddy Yankee's YouTube account on January 18, 2018, where it had over two billion views as of February 2026.

Writing for Billboard, Marjua Estevez stated that "Daddy Yankee's vibrant, '90s-friendly dance video for "Dura" is such a refreshing visual, in how it disrupts the onslaught of today's humdrum make-it-rain-and-pop-bottles musical spectacles." An editor of The Straits Times wrote that "in a retro video, Daddy Yankee and his cohorts dance around well-trodden streets covered with vibrant street art. Women, who often have passive roles in highly sexual songs, take the lead in showing their moves." On a press release by French news agency Agence France-Presse (AFP) it was stated that the music video "is reminiscent of those of twenty years ago. Young adults dance in streets with tagged walls, with invigorating colors."

== Live performances ==
The first stage live performance of "Dura" was held at the 30th Lo Nuestro Awards on February 22, 2018. The remix version featuring Becky G, Bad Bunny and Natti Natasha was performed at the 25th Billboard Latin Music Awards on April 26, 2018, as a surprise prior to its release.

== Credits and personnel ==
Credits adapted from Tidal.

- Urbani Mota – producer, songwriting
- Juan Rivera – songwriting
- Luis Romero – producer, songwriting
- Daddy Yankee – songwriting, lead vocals

== Charts ==
=== Weekly charts ===
Chart (2018)	Peak position
Argentina (Argentina Hot 100) Remix version	11
Argentina (Monitor Latino)	1
Austria (Ö3 Austria Top 40)	71
Belgium (Ultratop 50 Flanders)	11
Belgium (Ultratip Bubbling Under Wallonia)	9
Bolivia (Monitor Latino)	1
Canada Hot 100 (Billboard)	77
Chile (Monitor Latino)	1
Colombia (Monitor Latino)	3
Colombia (National-Report)	3
Costa Rica (Monitor Latino)	5
Croatia (HRT)	74
Dominican Republic (SODINPRO)	5
Dominican Republic (Monitor Latino)	1
Ecuador (Monitor Latino)	1
Ecuador (National-Report)	7
El Salvador (Monitor Latino)	1
France (SNEP)	79
Germany (GfK)	60
Guatemala (Monitor Latino)	1
Honduras (Monitor Latino)	1
Hungary (Dance Top 40)	29
Hungary (Rádiós Top 40)	33
Hungary (Single Top 40)	14
Italy (FIMI)	19
Japan Hot 100 (Billboard)	65
Mexico (Monitor Latino)	6
Mexico (Billboard Mexican Airplay)	6
Netherlands (Dutch Top 40)	2
Netherlands (Single Top 100)	5
Nicaragua (Monitor Latino)	1
Panama (Monitor Latino)	1
Paraguay (Monitor Latino)	1
Peru (Monitor Latino)	1
Portugal (AFP)	18
Slovakia Singles Digital (ČNS IFPI)	79
Spain (PROMUSICAE)	1
Sweden Heatseeker (Sverigetopplistan)	2
Switzerland (Schweizer Hitparade)	22
Uruguay (Monitor Latino)	4
US Billboard Hot 100	43
US Hot Latin Songs (Billboard)	2
US Latin Airplay (Billboard)	1
US Latin Rhythm Airplay (Billboard)	1
Venezuela (Monitor Latino)	2

=== Monthly charts ===
Chart (2018)	Peak position
Venezuela (National-Report)	1

=== Year-end charts ===
Chart (2018)	Position
Argentina (Monitor Latino)	3
Belgium (Ultratop Flanders)	45
France (SNEP)	179
Hungary (Dance Top 40)	98
Hungary (Rádiós Top 40)	81
Italy (FIMI)	36
Netherlands (Dutch Top 40)	4
Netherlands (Single Top 100)	18
Portugal (AFP)	62
Spain (PROMUSICAE)	2
Switzerland (Schweizer Hitparade)	53
US Billboard Hot 100	93
US Hot Latin Songs (Billboard)	3
Chart (2019)	Position
Hungary (Dance Top 40)	83

=== Decade-end charts ===
Chart (2010–2019)	Position
US Hot Latin Songs (Billboard)	27

== Certifications ==
Region	Certification	Certified units/sales
Argentina (CAPIF)	3× Platinum	
Brazil (Pro-Música Brasil)	Diamond	160,000^{‡}
Chile	3× Platinum	
Colombia	3× Platinum	
Ecuador	Gold	
France (SNEP)	Gold	100,000^{‡}
Italy (FIMI)	2× Platinum	100,000^{‡}
Mexico (AMPROFON)	2× Platinum	120,000^{‡}
Peru	Platinum	
Poland (ZPAV)	Gold	25,000^{‡}
Portugal (AFP)	Platinum	10,000^{‡}
Spain (Promusicae)	5× Platinum	300,000^{‡}
Spain (Promusicae) Remix version	2× Platinum	80,000^{‡}
United States (RIAA)	43× Platinum (Latin)	2,580,000^{‡}
Streaming
Sweden (GLF)	Gold	4,000,000^{†}
^{‡} Sales+streaming figures based on certification alone.^{†} Streaming-only figures based on certification alone.

== See also ==
- List of Billboard Hot Latin Songs and Latin Airplay number ones of 2018
