= Otra Cosa (song) =

2016 single by Daddy Yankee

Single by Daddy Yankee and Natti Natasha

from the album El Disco Duro
- Language: Spanish
- English title: "Another Thing"
- Released: December 9, 2016
- Genre: Reggaeton; dancehall; moombahton
- Length: 3:28
- Label: Pina
- Songwriter(s): Ramón Ayala; Natalia Gutiérrez; Egbert Rosa
- Producer(s): Haze

Daddy Yankee singles chronology
"Shaky Shaky" (2016)	"Otra Cosa" (2016)	"La Rompe Corazones" (2017)

Natti Natasha singles chronology
"Perdido en tus Ojos" (2015)	"Otra cosa" (2016)	"Criminal" (2017)

Music video
- "Otra Cosa" on YouTube

"Otra Cosa" (English: "Another Thing") is a single by Puerto Rican rapper Daddy Yankee and Dominican singer Natti Natasha from the former's upcoming studio album El Disco Duro. The single was released on December 9, 2016, and a music video directed by Luieville & Company premiered on January 27, 2017. The song was written by Daddy Yankee, Natti Natasha, and Egbert Rosa, and was produced by Haze. Commercially, the song peaked at number one in the Dominican Republic and at number 21 on the US Hot Latin Songs chart.

== Background and release ==
"Otra Cosa" was written by Daddy Yankee, Natti Natasha, and Egbert "Haze" Rosa, and was produced by Puerto Rican Latin Grammy Award-winner producer Haze. The concept of the song was conceived by Haze, who brought the idea to Daddy Yankee, who wrote the chorus, his verse, and made the arrangements. The single was released on digital stores on December 9, 2016, by Pina Records with distribution by Sony Music Latin. It was originally released as part of Pina Records' upcoming various artists album La Súper Fórmula but Daddy Yankee managed to also include it on his upcoming studio album El Disco Duro.

== Composition ==
"Otra Cosa" is a reggaeton, dancehall, and moombahton song with a length of three minutes and twenty-eight seconds. The lyrics are about lovesickness. Natti Natasha stated that the story "is a bit complicated for women, because I know that both men and women will understand because they are things that happen on a daily basis, but this time we had the opportunity to express it in a song." She added that "not always what seems to be good and elegant is good for love" and described the song as about "toxic love." Daddy Yankee expressed that "I think that when you find the balance between man and woman in a subject, I think that everyone can identify. This time I have to be, as always in love, the bad guy."

== Music video ==
The music video for "Otra Cosa" was directed by Luieville & Company. Filming took place in Miami in November 2016. The visual premiered through Daddy Yankee's YouTube account on January 27, 2017.

== Charts ==
=== Weekly charts ===
Chart (2016–17)	Peak position
Dominican Republic (Monitor Latino)	1
US Hot Latin Songs (Billboard)	21
US Latin Airplay (Billboard)	11
US Latin Rhythm Airplay (Billboard)	10
US Tropical Airplay (Billboard)	17

=== Year-end charts ===
Chart (2017)	Position
US Hot Latin Songs (Billboard)	80
