= Shaky Shaky =

Single by Daddy Yankee

from the album El Disco Duro
- Released: April 8, 2016
- Recorded: December 11, 2015
- Studio: Evo Jedis Studio; (Santurce, Puerto Rico)
- Genre: Reggaeton
- Length: 3:53
- Label: El Cartel; Universal Latin
- Songwriters: Ramón Ayala; Urbani Mota; Luis Romero
- Producer: Los Evo Jedis

Daddy Yankee singles chronology
"Andas en Mi Cabeza" (2016)	"Shaky Shaky" (2016)	"Otra Cosa" (2016)

Music video
- "Shaky Shaky" on YouTube

"Shaky Shaky" is a single by Puerto Rican rapper Daddy Yankee that was intended to appear on his unreleased studio album El Disco Duro. The song was recorded in December 2015 as a freestyle during a recording session in Puerto Rico and later released on April 8, 2016 by El Cartel Records. The song was written by Daddy Yankee, Urbani "Urba" Mota and Luis "Rome" Romero. It was produced by Los Evo Jedis, the duo of Urbani Mota and Luis Romero.

The song became Yankee's fourth number one Billboard's Hot Latin Songs chart and also his first Billboard Hot 100 entry since 2007. Its official music video, released on July 14, 2016, surpassed "Limbo" (2012) as Daddy Yankee's most-viewed YouTube video. Commercially, the topped the Dominican, Mexican and US Hot Latin Songs charts, while also reaching the top ten in Argentina, Chile, and Colombia. A remix version featuring reggaeton acts Nicky Jam and the duo Plan B was released alongside on October 14, 2016. The single was chosen by Billboard as the Best Latin Dance Song of 2016.

== Composition ==
"Shaky Shaky" is a reggaeton song composed in 4/4 time with 88 beats per minute. According to Daddy Yankee, the main vocals were recorded in one-take and the lyrics were improvised during a recording session with the production duo Los Evo Jedis. Yankee and DJ Urba, member of the duo, had already worked together on albums including Los Homerun-es (2003), Barrio Fino (2004) and Barrio Fino En Directo (2005), highlighting singles such as "Gata Gangster", "No Me Dejes Solo" and "Rompe". The keyboard bass line was based on the electric guitar one from the single "Murder She Wrote" by Chaka Demus & Pliers, released in 1992.

== Release and reception ==
The song was recorded and later officially announced on December 11, 2015 as a freestyle scheduled to be released that Christmas. Before its official release, a 16-second-long preview of the song was published by Daddy Yankee during early 2016 in order to incentivate his fans to make short video dancing to the track. The song became a trend without even being released, as a lot of fans around the world and other reggaeton acts, including Farruko, Zion & Lennox, Nicky Jam and J Balvin, uploaded videos dancing to the song's preview. "Shaky Shaky" was released on April 8, 2016 as the third single of his upcoming album: El Disco Duro. Because of the positive response by the fans, Yankee announced the Shaky Challenge in July, which consisted in sending a video dancing to the song, similar to what he intended to do when he released a short preview of the track before that year. The winner of the contest would have a video chat with Daddy Yankee and also would be able to participate on the remix's lyric video. It became his 44th song that managed to chart on Billboard's Hot Latin Songs and also his fourth No. 1 hit single on the chart, being his first one since February 2013. The single spent four non-consecutive weeks at the top position of the chart. On the chart dated January 14, 2017, the song debuted at number 100 on the Billboard Hot 100 chart, being Daddy Yankee's first appearance on that list since the chart dated May 26, 2007, when his single "Impacto" debuted at the 95th position. A remix version featuring Nicky Jam and the duo Plan B was released alongside its lyric video on October 14, 2016.

"Shaky Shaky" received positive reception among fans and music critics. Jon Caramanica, editor of The New York Times newspaper, described the song as "Nimble, simple and catchy, Daddy Yankee's umpteenth reggaeton hit is among his most effective, a throwback to his bold singles of a decade ago." Al Kendrick Noguera, editor of the Philippine television network GMA Network, said that "After 'Trumpets' came another viral sensation known as the #ShakyChallenge, derived from the single 'Shaky Shaky' from Daddy that made everyone dance in the Philippines." Jason Birchmeier, editor of the online music guide service AllMusic, stated that the song "reached the mainstream through a social network app and a hypermarket advertisement". American newspaper Latin Times described it as a contagious song whose lyrics are easy to remember: "If you repeat the song over and over while you're in your car, for example, you won't stop singing it the whole day." American magazine Billboard chose "Shaky Shaky" as the Best Latin Dance Song of 2016 and stated that "Clever Daddy Yankee [...] went on Musical.ly before the track was on radio or had a music video and asked fans to film themselves doing the 'Shaky Shaky'. Some of that made it onto the music video, which shows a dance that you should only attempt if you're a master at shaking that booty reggaeton-style. But 'Shaky Shaky' transcends."

=== Accolades ===
"Shaky Shaky" received three nominations on the Latin Music Italian Awards of 2016 and other two pending nominations on the Billboard Latin Music Awards of 2017.

Year	Award	Category	Result
2017	ASCAP Awards	Latin Award-Winning Urban Songs	Recipient
2017	Billboard Latin Music Awards	Hot Latin Song of the Year	Nominated
2017	Billboard Latin Music Awards	Streaming Song of the Year	Nominated
2017	Billboard Music Awards	Top Latin Song	Nominated

== Music video ==
The music video was filmed in Miami, New York City and Los Angeles and was released on July 14, 2016, ending the year as the 23rd most-viewed YouTube video of 2016. It shows Daddy Yankee and more than a hundred dancers dancing in different locations, including a parking lot, streets, houses and a shopping mall. The video version replaces the words jodedera (jargon for party or screwing) and jodona (a woman who likes to have fun bothering other people) from the single version by gozadera (Spanish for revelry) and en la zona (Spanish for in the zone). American newspaper Latin Times said that the music video is "brilliant, vibrant, family friendly, fun, contagious and sends the message that music can bring people together from all over the world." In December 2016, the music video of "Shaky Shaky" became Daddy Yankee's most-viewed on YouTube, surpassing "Limbo". As of July 2025, it has received over 1.7 billion views.

== Personnel ==
- Daddy Yankee – songwriting, lead vocals
- Urbani Mota – producer, audio mixing
- Luis Romero – producer, audio mixing

== Chart performance ==
=== Weekly charts ===
Chart (2016–17)	Peak Position
Chile (Monitor Latino)	5
Colombia (Monitor Latino)	4
Dominican Republic (Monitor Latino)	2
Guatemala (Monitor Latino)	11
Mexico (Monitor Latino)	1
Mexico Airplay (Billboard)	7
Mexico Streaming (AMPROFON)	6
Spain (PROMUSICAE)	25
Uruguay (Monitor Latino)	14
US Billboard Hot 100	88
US Hot Latin Songs (Billboard)	1
US Latin Airplay (Billboard)	11
US Latin Rhythm Airplay (Billboard)	1
US Tropical Songs (Billboard)	1
Venezuela (National-Report)	42

=== Monthly charts ===
Chart (2016)	Peak position
Argentina (CAPIF)	2

=== Year-end charts ===
Chart (2016)	Position
Spain (PROMUSICAE)	56
US Hot Latin Songs (Billboard)	8
US Tropical Songs (Billboard)	12
Venezuela (National-Report)	80

== Certifications ==
Region	Certification	Certified units/sales
Italy (FIMI)	Platinum	50,000^{‡}
Spain (Promusicae)	2× Platinum	80,000^{‡}
United States (RIAA)	23× Platinum (Latin)	1,380,000^{‡}
^{‡} Sales+streaming figures based on certification alone.

== Appearances in other media ==
The Philippine show Eat Bulaga!, the longest-running noon time variety program in the country, created a segment dedicated to people using their creativity while dancing to the song. In August 2016, Argentinian television hosts Zaira Nara and Gerardo Rozin danced to it on air during a Morfi Telefé program. Daddy Yankee was informed about that and congratulated them via Twitter. American rapper Snoop Dogg danced to the track on his concert on Punta Cana, Dominican Republic on December 16, 2016. Later that month, American multinational Walmart released a Christmas TV spot about kids shaking their gifts in order to guess what is inside them while "Shaky Shaky" is playing. Olga Reyes, executive creative director of Lopez Negrete Communications, said that "Music is a key element in the Walmart campaign, and in this particular spot we needed to tell a story about Christmas morning, about finding the perfect gift and the kids opening the presents. As soon as I heard 'Shaky Shaky', I could see in my mind the kids shaking those gifts."

The song is also featured in the 2018 dance video game Just Dance 2019.

== Release history ==
Region	Date	Format	Label
Worldwide	April 8, 2016	Digital download	El Cartel; Universal Latin
Worldwide	October 14, 2016 (Remix version)	Digital download	El Cartel; Universal Latin

== See also ==
- List of number-one Billboard Hot Latin Songs of 2016
- List of number-one songs of 2016 (Mexico)
