= La Rompe Corazones =

2017 single by Daddy Yankee

Single by Daddy Yankee featuring Ozuna

from the album El Disco Duro
- Language: Spanish
- English title: "The Heartbreaker"
- Released: January 6, 2017
- Recorded: 2016
- Genre: Reggaeton
- Length: 3:24
- Label: El Cartel
- Songwriters: Ramón Ayala; Jesús Benítez; Carlos Ortíz; Juan Carlos Ozuna
- Producers: Chris Jedi; Gaby Music; Max Borghetti

Daddy Yankee singles chronology
| "Otra Cosa" (2016) | "La Rompe Corazones" (2017) | "Despacito" (2017) |

Music video
- "La Rompe Corazones" on YouTube

"La Rompe Corazones" (English: "The Heartbreaker") is a single by Puerto Rican rapper Daddy Yankee featuring Puerto Rican singer Ozuna from his upcoming studio album El Disco Duro. A music video directed by Nuno Gómes was published on June 6, 2017. The song was written by Daddy Yankee, Ozuna, Jesús Benítez, and Carlos Ortíz, and was produced by Chris Jedi, Max Borghetti and Gaby Music. "La Rompe Corazones" peaked at number 12 on the US Hot Latin Songs chart.

== Background and release ==
"La Rompe Corazones" was written by Daddy Yankee, Ozuna, Jesús "Benny Benni" Benítez, and Carlos "Chris Jedi" Ortíz, and was produced by Puerto Rican record producers Chris Jedi and Gaby Music. Daddy Yankee and Ozuna had previously worked on a remix version of the latter's "No Quiere Enamorarse", digitally released on March 24, 2016, which peaked at number 35 on the US Hot Latin Songs chart.

The song's official audio was published on Daddy Yankee's YouTube account on January 6, 2017, as a gift to his fans for Epiphany. It was released on digital stores on January 20, 2017, by his label El Cartel Records under exclusive license to Universal Music Latin.

== Composition ==
Daddy Yankee wanted to highlight the well-calculated side of women stating that the song "is the story of a lovesick woman who no longer trusts her relationships. On the contrary, her mission is now to avenge herself through the frustration of all those men she decides to be. She always has doubts. She wants to fall in love, but she does not do it because of that memory that was captured on her."

== Commercial performance ==
In the United States, "La Rompe Corazones" debuted at number 15 on the US Latin Rhythm Digital Song Sales chart on February 11, 2017. Two months later, the single debuted at number 46 on the US Hot Latin Songs chart on April 15, 2017, and peaked at number 12 on July 22, 2017. It was the 21st best-performing song of 2017 on Hot Latin Songs, as well as the 47th best-selling and the 14th most-played Latin song of the year in the United States. "La Rompe Corazones" also became the 30th most-played radio song of 2017 across Latin America, with 152,240 spins between the 18 countries Monitor Latino measure.

== Music video ==
The music video for "La Rompe Corazones" was directed by Venezuelan director Nuno Gómes and stars Venezuelan actors Carlos Felipe Álvarez and Yelena Maciel. The clip was scheduled to premier on Daddy Yankee's YouTube account on June 2, 2017, but had to be re-edited on June 1, 2017, due to the platform's change on its content regulations. The visual finally premiered on June 7, 2017.

== Credits and personnel ==
Credits adapted from Tidal.

- Jesús Benítez – songwriting
- Chris Jedi – producer, songwriting
- Gaby Music – producer
- Max Borghetti – producer
- Ozuna – songwriting, lead vocals
- Daddy Yankee – songwriting, lead vocals

== Charts ==
=== Weekly charts ===
| Chart (2017) | Peak position |
|---|---|
| Argentina Latin (Monitor Latino) | 15 |
| Chile (Monitor Latino) | 15 |
| Dominican Republic Urban (Monitor Latino) | 17 |
| Mexico Airplay (Billboard) | 5 |
| Mexico Streaming (AMPROFON) | 10 |
| Paraguay (Monitor Latino) | 3 |
| Peru (Monitor Latino) | 2 |
| Spain (PROMUSICAE) | 8 |
| US Hot Latin Songs (Billboard) | 12 |
| US Latin Airplay (Billboard) | 6 |
| US Latin Rhythm Airplay (Billboard) | 1 |

=== Year-end charts ===
| Chart (2017) | Position |
|---|---|
| Argentina (Monitor Latino) | 63 |
| Bolivia (Monitor Latino) | 45 |
| Chile (Monitor Latino) | 28 |
| Colombia (Monitor Latino) | 79 |
| Dominican Republic (Monitor Latino) | 38 |
| Ecuador Urban (Monitor Latino) | 60 |
| El Salvador (Monitor Latino) | 60 |
| Guatemala (Monitor Latino) | 42 |
| Honduras (Monitor Latino) | 25 |
| Mexico Pop (Monitor Latino) | 75 |
| Nicaragua (Monitor Latino) | 31 |
| Panama (Monitor Latino) | 51 |
| Paraguay (Monitor Latino) | 48 |
| Peru (Monitor Latino) | 20 |
| Spain (PROMUSICAE) | 19 |
| Uruguay (Monitor Latino) | 99 |
| US Hot Latin Songs (Billboard) | 21 |
| Venezuela (Monitor Latino) | 63 |

== Certifications ==
| Region | Certification | Certified units/sales |
|---|---|---|
| Italy (FIMI) | Gold | 25,000^{‡} |
| Spain (Promusicae) | 3× Platinum | 120,000^{‡} |
| United States (RIAA) | 17× Platinum (Latin) | 1,020,000^{‡} |
^{‡} Sales+streaming figures based on certification alone.
