= Vuelve (Daddy Yankee and Bad Bunny song) =

2017 single by Daddy Yankee and Bad Bunny

Single by Daddy Yankee and Bad Bunny

from the album El Disco Duro
- Language: Spanish
- English title: "Come Back"
- Released: September 29, 2017
- Genre: Latin trap
- Length: 4:48
- Label: El Cartel Records
- Songwriters: Ramón Ayala; Luian Malavé; Benito Martínez; Carlos Ortíz; Xavier Semper; Edgar Semper
- Producers: Mambo Kingz; DJ Luian

Daddy Yankee singles chronology
| "Despacito" (remix) (2017) | "Vuelve" (2017) | "Bella y Sensual" (2017) |

Bad Bunny singles chronology
| "Pure" (2017) | "Vuelve" (2017) | "Tú No Metes Cabra" (remix) (2017) |

Music video
- "Vuelve" on YouTube

"Vuelve" (transl. "Come Back") is a single by Puerto Ricans rappers Daddy Yankee and Bad Bunny from the former's then-planned studio album El Disco Duro. On September 29, 2017, El Cartel Records released "Vuelve" and its music video, directed by Daniel Durán. Both artists also wrote it alongside Carlos Ortíz, Luian Malavé, and Edgar and Xavier Semper, and was produced by Mambo Kingz and DJ Luian. Commercially, the song peaked at number six in the Dominican Republic and at number 11 on the US Hot Latin Songs chart.

== Composition ==
"Vuelve" is a dark Latin trap-influenced song with a length of four minutes and forty-eight seconds. The lyrics has been described as "lack of love song" that tells the story of a man who tells his ex-girlfriend that he misses her and that he knows she misses him too, despite she being already with another man.

== Commercial performance ==
"Vuelve" was released for digital stores and streaming platforms on September 29, 2017 by Daddy Yankee's label El Cartel Records under exclusive license to Universal Music Latin. It was the 88th best-performing single of 2017 in the US Hot Latin Songs chart. In Spain, the single peaked at number 17 and received a platinum certification by the Spanish Music Producers (PROMUSICAE) for units of over 40,000 sales plus track-equivalent streams.

== Credits and personnel ==
Credits adapted from Tidal.

- Bad Bunny – songwriting, lead vocals
- Luian Malavé – producer, songwriting
- Carlos Ortíz – songwriting
- Xavier Semper – producer, songwriting
- Edgar Semper – producer, songwriting
- Daddy Yankee – songwriting, lead vocals

== Charts ==
=== Weekly charts ===
| Chart (2017–18) | Peak position |
|---|---|
| Dominican Republic (Monitor Latino) | 6 |
| Honduras (Monitor Latino) | 4 |
| Nicaragua (Monitor Latino) | 10 |
| Spain (PROMUSICAE) | 17 |
| US Hot Latin Songs (Billboard) | 11 |

=== Year-end charts ===
| Chart (2017) | Position |
|---|---|
| US Hot Latin Songs (Billboard) | 88 |
| Chart (2018) | Position |
| US Hot Latin Songs (Billboard) | 65 |

== Certifications ==
| Region | Certification | Certified units/sales |
|---|---|---|
| Spain (Promusicae) | 2× Platinum | 200,000^{‡} |
| United States (RIAA) | Diamond (Latin) | 600,000^{‡} |
^{‡} Sales+streaming figures based on certification alone.
