= Lopez Negrete Communications =

- Company type: Private
- Industry: Advertising
- Founder: Alex López Negrete, Cathy López Negrete
- Headquarters: Houston, Texas, United States
- Area served: United States
- Key people: Alex López Negrete (CEO), Cathy López Negrete (CFO)

Lopez Negrete Communications is an advertising agency based out of Houston, Texas that focuses on the Hispanic community. Lopez Negrete has created advertising campaigns for numerous national brands, including Bank of America, Wal-Mart, Microsoft, Royal Dutch Shell, Miller Brewing Company, the Houston Astros, and NBC Universal. In a 2007 Billboard magazine article, Lopez Negrete was described as the "top Latin ad agency" and the company's CEO, Alex López Negrete, was named 2012 Agency Executive of the Year by HispanicAd.com.

== 2006 ==
In May 2006, the Houston Business Journal rated Lopez Negrete Communications as the second largest advertising firm in Houston, and reported that it had a revenue of $135 million.

== 2007 ==
In December 2007, López Negrete Communications opened an office in the city of Burbank, California. This was because López Negrete Communications won the "media planning and buying account" for NBC Universal, according to the Houston Business Journal.

== 2009 ==
In May 2009, Lopez Negrete signed with Dr Pepper Snapple Group and Kraft Singles to do their Hispanic advertising. These deals accounted for a 9% increase in Lopez Negrete's revenue in 2009, according to Advertising Age. In the same 2009 article, Advertising Age noted that Lopez Negrete Communications was the fifth largest U.S. agency catered to the Hispanic public. Advertising Age added that their ads for Kraft Singles and Dr. Pepper were "standouts" for their ability to reach Hispanic teens.

In the Dr. Pepper campaign, the agency created a hit song "LaLaLaLife/Vida23" that was enhanced by an internet feature allowing teenagers to share and remix the song. Advertising Age credited Dr. Pepper's 9.5% sales increase to U.S. Hispanics to this advertisement. In the Vida23 campaign, Lopez Negrete Communications worked with Andres Levin and Cucu Diamantes from Yerba Buena, a New York Grammy-nominated fusion band.

== 2010 ==
In February 2010, Brett Elliott, a senior copywriter at Lopez Negrete Communications was awarded with the Silver Medal Award at the ADDY Awards. The award was given posthumously as Elliott died in March 2009.

In July 2010, Lopez Negrete joined with Cesar Millan, known as the Dog Whisperer, to bring awareness to the Hispanic community about pet overpopulation and to promote neutering.

In August 2010, Lopez Negrete Communications was named Hispanic agency of record for Georgia-Pacific’s Quilted Northern Bath Tissue.

In early October 2010, Verizon Communications chose Lopez Negrete Communications, Houston, as its agency for ads aimed at Spanish-speaking consumers for the company’s landline telephone, high-speed Internet and FiOS television services.

On October 12, 2010, Alex López Negrete was inducted to the American Advertising Federation Class of 2010 Southwest Hall of Fame. According to the source, the honor goes to "elite men and women, who have distinguished themselves in their careers, have contributed to the betterment of advertising and its reputation, and who have made volunteer efforts outside the workplace."

== 2011 ==
In March 2011, Lopez Negrete Communications announced that it would "take over its brand leadership, strategic planning, business analytics and creative development" for Kraft Foods brand Maxwell House. This marks the fourth Kraft Foods brand to join the agency's client roster.

== 2013 ==
In May 2013, AHAA: The Voice of Hispanic Marketing honored Walmart, a Lopez Negrete client, with its first annual Marketer of the Year Award.

In July 2013, Lopez Negrete Communications joined with the Recreational Fishing and Boating Foundation to launch a five-year campaign to increase boating and fishing participation among the Hispanic population.

Also in July 2013, Lopez Negrete Communications was named the Hispanic agency of record for Verizon Wireless.
