= Sígueme y Te Sigo =

2015 single by Daddy Yankee

"Sigueme y Te Sigo"

Single by Daddy Yankee

from the album El Disco Duro
- Released: March 12, 2015
- Genre: Reggaeton; Latin pop
- Length: 3:31
- Label: Universal Latino
- Songwriters: Ramón Ayala; Carlos Ortíz; Luis Ortíz
- Producers: Chris Jeday; Gaby Music

Daddy Yankee singles chronology
"Nota de Amor" (2015)	"Sigueme y Te Sigo" (2015)	"We Wanna" (2015)

Music video
- "Sigueme y te Sigo" on YouTube

"Sigueme y Te Sigo" (English: "Follow Me and I Follow You") is a song by Puerto Rican artist Daddy Yankee. It is the second single from his upcoming studio album El Disco Duro, originally scheduled to be released during early 2017. It was written by Daddy Yankee, Luis "Wichi" Ortíz, and Chris Jeday (who is also the producer). The song received two Latin Grammy Awards nominations and won a Latin American Music Award for Favorite Urban Song in 2015.

== Music video ==
The official music video was released on May 11 through his Vevo channel. The theme of the video features a live singer at a school dance, with the king and queen to be chosen according to how many followers they have in social networks, hence the title of the song, although the lyrics are not centred in social networks. The music video has reached 633 million views.

== Charts and certifications ==
=== Weekly charts ===
Chart (2015)	Peak position
France (SNEP)	199
Spain (Promusicae)	12
US Hot Latin Songs (Billboard)	6
US Latin Airplay (Billboard)	1
US Latin Rhythm Airplay (Billboard)	1
US Latin Pop Airplay (Billboard)	3
US Tropical Songs (Billboard)	5

=== Year-end charts ===
Chart (2015)	Peak position
Spain (PROMUSICAE)	17
US Hot Latin Songs (Billboard)	15
US Latin Airplay Songs (Billboard)	10
US Latin Digital Songs (Billboard)	21
US Latin Pop Songs (Billboard)	17
US Tropical Songs (Billboard)	17

=== Sales and certifications ===
Sales
Region	Certification	Certified units
Chile (IFPI)	Platinum	10,000
Italy (FIMI)	Gold	25,000
Streaming
Spain (PROMUSICAE)	2× Platinum	16,000,000

== Accolades ==
List of awards and nominations
Award	Date of ceremony	Category	Result	Ref(s)
Latin American Music Awards	October 8, 2015	Favorite Urban Song	Won	
Latin Grammy Awards	November 19, 2015	Best Urban Song	Nominated	
Latin Grammy Awards	November 19, 2015	Best Urban Performance	Nominated	
ASCAP Latin Music Awards	May 11, 2016	Urban Winning Song	Won	

== See also ==
- List of Billboard number-one Latin songs of 2015
