= DJ Playero =

Puerto Rican DJ and reggaeton record producer (born 1964)

Playero DJ /DJ Playero
- Also known as: The Majestic; Playero; Playe; DJ Playe; Play; DJ Play
- Born: Pedro Gerardo Torruellas Brito; 2 November 1964 (age 61); Residencial Villa Kennedy, Santurce, Puerto Rico
- Genre: Reggaeton
- Occupations: DJ; record producer
- Instrument: DJ mixer
- Years active: 1987–present
- Labels: BM; PlayGround; Columbia; Sony BMG

Pedro Gerardo Torruellas Brito (born 2 November 1964), better known as Playero DJ, DJ Playero, Playe, Play, is a Puerto Rican DJ who was a key figure in the dissemination of reggaeton during its formative period in the 1990s in San Juan, Puerto Rico.

== Early life ==
Beginning in the early 1990s, he intended to do what DJ Tony Touch was already doing in New York, who was releasing a series of mixtapes, mixing popular and classic songs off most known musical styles like Reggae, Hip Hop and House. It is rumored that Playero gained his name for always using colorful t-shirts that resembled the spirit of the Summer season, and people wore them when going to the beach and they were called "Summer T'shirts", which translated in Spanish would be "Camisas Playeras".

== Mixtapes ==
Though Playero's mixtapes presumably started in Number 1 and synthesized hip-hop and dancehall/reggae rhythms, it is not known that Volumes 1 to 33 do already exist. Playero #34 made its appearance on the Internet some years ago and it was heard by people around the world realizing that this mixtape was putting together dancehall, hip hop and Puerto Rican singers freestyling in Spanish-language.

These tape and the following 35 and 36 circulated around the barrios of San Juan and were highly influential upon the generation that would go on to define reggaeton in the coming decade. Most of these tapes were sold by Playero himself and the singers who had recorded in them. That's how Daddy Yankee got his start with DJ Playero, debuting on the mixtape Playero 34, which was recorded in a small studio in one of Puerto Rico's caseríos and was originally released around 1994. It contained several Jamaican dancehall songs which were mixed and edited like "Freaks" (Lil Vicious). It is also believed to be the first recording to use the word reggaeton, which was sung by Daddy Yankee.

== Career ==
DJ Playero was an aspiring producer at the time, he worked in the first LP of The Pioneer Lisa M (Trampa 1990) and (No Lo Derrumbes 1990) 3-2 Get Funky (3-2 Get Funky, 1993; Return of the Funky Ones, 1994), Ranking Stone (Different Styles, 1995), Wiso G (Estoy Aqui, 1996), and Wendellman (Wendellman, 1996). During the late 1990s, as the proto-reggaeton style began to grow popular thanks to 'The Noise', a club-based collective that issued a long-running series of CDs. Playero en DVD: Su Trayectoria (2003) was the culmination of this activity, aiming to cement his legacy as one of the key reggaeton pioneers.

== Discography ==
=== Mixtapes ===
DJ Playero's 1 to 36 mixtape release dates range from around 1992–1994.

=== Studio albums ===
- Playero 37
  - Underground (original limited release) (1993)
  - Underground (wide release) (1994)
  - The Original (2CD) (87 min. version) (edited) (1999)
  - 20th. Anniversary Edition (digital reissue) (2014)
- Playero 38 (1994)
  - Special Edition (2CD reissue) (2000)
- Playero 39: Respect (1995)
- DJ Playero Presenta: Montana Collection Vol. 1 (1995)
- Playero 40: New Era (1996)
- Playero 41: Past Present & Future
  - Part 1 (1998)
  - Part 2 (1999)
- DJ Playero Presenta Berto Guayama - Deja Vú (2001)
- Playero 42: El Especialista, Episodio 1 (2002)

=== Compilations ===
- Playero DJ Presenta: Éxitos 95 (1995)
- Playero DJ – Greatest Hits – Street Mix (1995)
- M.C. Stop Reggae (1995)
- Playero DJ – Greatest Hits – Street Mix Vol. 2 (1996)
- Playero Presenta: Éxitos 97 (1997)
- Playero DJ – Greatest Hits – Street Mix Vol. 3 (1999)
- DJ Playero: The Collection (2CD) (2002)
- Playero DJ - The Best Of (2002)
- Playero DJ - Old School Reggaeton (2009)

=== Instrumental albums ===
- Playero Pistas - Play the Beat (2000)

=== Live albums ===
- Playero DJ Live (1996)
- Playero - Naranjito Live (1997)

=== Bootlegs ===
- Playero DJ - Live from New York Discoteque (show) (1993)
- Playero Rap & Reggae 96 (for the Radial show Rap & Reggae 96 on Y96) (1994)
- Playero - Birthday Live in Cupey (1996)

=== CD singles ===
- "DJ Playero (radio version)" (1997)

=== Other albums which he has collaborated on with Sharon Marcano ===
- M.C. Non Stop Reggae Vol. 1 (1994)
- M.C. Non Stop Reggae Vol. 2 (1995)
- Reggae 4 U (1995) (with DJ Black)
- Wendellman (with Wendellman and DJ Karlo) (1996)
- Boricua Guerrero - The E.P. (with Nico Canada) (1997)
- The Legend (1997)
- Boricua Guerrero First Combat (1997)
- The Warriors 3 (with DJ Blass) (2001)
- Los Más Buscados (with Nico Canada, DJ Joe and DJ Blass) (2002)
- The Majestic 1 (2002)
- Kilates 1: Rompiendo el Silencio (2002)
- Kilates 2: Segundo Impacto - El Silencio Que Duele (2003)
- The Majestic 2: Segundo Imperio (2004)

== Filmography ==
- Playero En DVD – Su Trayectoria (DVDA) (2003)
