= Playero 37 =

Studio album by DJ Playero
- Released: 1994 (original limited release) 1994 (wide release) (Puerto Rico) 1999 (reissue titled The Original)
- Recorded: 1994
- Genre: Reggaeton
- Labels: Play Ground; Bayamon
- Producer: DJ Playero

DJ Playero chronology
Playero 36 (1994)	Playero 37 (1994)	Playero 38 (1994)

Playero 37 is DJ Playero's first studio album. It is considered a landmark album and influential in the creation of the music genre now known as "reggaeton". The album was released in 1994. Playero recorded and mixed the album in one week inside his home located in Villa Kennedy, Puerto Rico. The album consists of fusions between hip hop and Jamaican dancehall riddims with Latino rappers rhyming over the beats in Spanish. The first pressing which is a rarity was released only on cassette tape. Around a few hundred original copies were sold while most people who received the initial version copied from those original tapes.

Playero 37's success lead to a partnership with Bayamon Records (BM Records) for wide release on cassette and CD in 1994. It became one of the first "underground" albums (which is what reggaeton used to be known as back then), to receive wide distribution inside of Puerto Rico and parts of the United States. Despite being banned from radio and television due to its explicit content, the album would go on to earn a gold certification for the sale of 30 thousand units. It eventually sold over 100,000 copies. Today, the album is known for introducing influential reggaeton artists such as OG Black, Master Joe, Q Mac Daddy, Frankie Boy, Maicol & Manuel, Blanco, B.F Yaviah and Daddy Yankee. It is considered by many to be the most influential reggaeton album of all time.

The original first edition of Playero 37 was about 90 minutes long. The re-release via BM Records was cut down to under 50 minutes and is the most well-known version of the album. The original 90 min. version was given a limited re-release by BM Records in 1999 retitled Playero 37: The Original. This edition contains clean and edited lyrics. A unedited version of the original edition is yet to be released outside of the first pressings on tape in 1993. Playero 37 was the continuation of a series of underground mixtapes by DJ Playero (credited as Playero DJ) and the first to contain all original material. Most of these tapes have been lost, though Playero 34—which contains Daddy Yankee's first recording—has resurfaced online. Playero 37 and its sequel Playero 38 along with other notable works like the Noise and the Mas Flow series went on to be the foundation for modern reggaeton and the dembow genre from the Dominican Republic.

== Track listing ==
Side A: "Dance Hall Mix"

1. OG Black
2. Master Joe
3. Baby J
4. Master Joe
5. Q Mack Daddy
6. OG Black
7. Baby J
8. Master Joe
9. B.F. Yaviah
10. Gummy Man
11. Master Joe
12. Baby J
13. OG Black
14. Q Mack Daddy
15. Baby J
16. Frankie Boy
17. Buru Fast
18. 2 Sweet
19. Blanco

Side B: "Ragga Moonfin Mix"

1. Daddy Yankee
2. Master Joe y Playero
3. Fellas Rican King
4. B.F. Yaviah
5. DJ Playero
6. 2 Sweet
7. Master Joe
8. Fat Flavor

Playero 37: The Original

1. "Donde Mi No Venga, Sigan Brincando, Nunca Me Quedo Atras, Yamilette, Ya Va Sonando" - Daddy Yankee
2. "Original Si Soy Yo" - Master Joe y Playero
3. "From, From the Weed" - Fellas Rican King
4. "Si Tu Quieres Fumar" - B.F. Yaviah
5. "Mi Amor" - 2 Sweet
6. "Vuelve Master Joe, Echa Pa' Ca, Te Gusta El Blunt, Ya (Master Joe)" - Master Joe, Chino Man, Fat Flavor
7. "Interlude Break" - DJ Playero
8. "Para Ti" - OG Black y Q Mack Daddy
9. "Marijuana Quiero Fumar" - Buru Fast
10. "Quien Dijo" - Fat Flavor, Master Joe, Funkie Ed, Genio
11. "Hazle Un Hechizo" - OG Black
12. "Mountain Spash" - 3 on Mic
13. "Se Te Hundió el Barco" - 3 Two Get Funky
14. "Quiero, Quiero" - DJ Playero
15. "Tiempo Ya" - Master Joe, O.G. Black, Q Mack Daddy, DJ Playero
16. "Intro" - DJ Playero
17. "Tú No Me Lo Cortas" - Ranking Stone
18. "Muevete Asi" - Frankie Boy
19. "La Predilecta" - OG Black
20. "Corre y Baila" - Wiso G.
21. "Atencion" - Master Joe
22. "Dame Tu Amor" - Baby J, Master Joe
23. "La Campeona, Oyeme Mamita, Eres Tu, Listo" - Q Mack Daddy, OG Black, Baby J, Master Joe
24. "Oye Chiquitico" - B.F. Yaviah
25. "Impro" - Gommy Man
26. "No Inventes" - Master Joe
27. "Corre y Buscalo" - Baby J
28. "37 Pa' Desordenar, Me Toca Implantar" - OG Black, Q Mack Daddy
29. "Numero 1" - Frankie Boy
30. "Pedaleando" - Buru Fast
31. "Numero 1" - 2 Sweet
32. "Besa Tu Cuerpo" - Blanco
33. "Prendelo, Subelo" - Lisa M.
34. "Yo Quiero Fumar" - B.F. Yaviah y Gommy Man
35. "Interesada" - Maicol y Manuel
36. "No Podras" - Master Joe
37. "La Quiero y La Amo" - Baby J
38. "Forma De Bailar" - Daddy Yankee y Bimbo
