= Playero 38 =

Studio album by DJ Playero
- Released: August 1994 (P.R.)
- Recorded: July – August 1994
- Genre: Reggaeton
- Length: 60:05
- Label: BM Records / Play Ground Records
- Producers: DJ Playero & Nico Canada

DJ Playero chronology
Playero 37 (1993)	Playero 38 (1994)	Playero 39: Respect (1995)

Playero 38 is DJ Playero's 2nd album, recorded sometime between July and August 1994. With the success of Playero 37: Underground, The Noise: Underground, The Noise Vol. 1 and The Noise Vol. 2 giving reggaeton great momentum, DJ Playero released Playero 38: Underground. It established the dembow as the official rhythm of reggaeton, while lifting the genre to mainstream status. However, as with Playero 37, many of the lyrics focus on promoting the use of marijuana, and this added to the negative perception the genre gained in its early stages. Consequently, the government of Puerto Rico confiscated thousands of reggaeton records, because of the lack of disclosure about their explicit content.

The album features many of the veterans from Playero 37, including Daddy Yankee, Blanco, Yaviah, OG Black, Master Joe, Frankie Boy, Maicol & Manuel, Ranking Stone, among others. It also introduces many future successful Reggaeton artists in Rey Pirin, Ruben Sam, Miguel Play, Kalil, Original Q, Grupo Nizze, Camalion and K.I.D.

== Track listing ==
Side A: Non-Stop Reggae

1. Intro 1 - Daddy Yankee By D Nice NYC
2. Blanco
3. Ruben Sam
4. Grupo Nizze
5. Alma
6. Rey Pirin
7. Camalion
8. O.G. Black
9. Q Mack Daddy & Nico Canada
10. Charlie & Dandy
11. Miguel Play
12. K.I.D.

Side B: Raagga Mix to Mix

1. Intro 2 - Maicol & Manuel
2. K.I.D.
3. Master Joe
4. DJ Playero
5. Frankie Boy
6. Shalimar
7. Ranking Stone
8. Original Q
9. 2 Sweet
10. Psycho Unity

Bonus Track

1. Intro 3 - O.G. Black
2. Q Mack Daddy
3. Grupo Nizze
4. Frankie Boy
5. Camalion
6. Ranking Stone
7. HCP & MC Tres
8. Gummy Man
9. B.F. Yaviah
10. Kalil
11. Mayordomo
