= Aquí Está Tu Caldo =

2004 song performed by Daddy Yankee

Single by Daddy Yankee

from the album La Trayectoria
- Released: 2004
- Recorded: 2003
- Genre: Reggaeton
- Length: 3:33
- Label: Universal Latino
- Songwriter(s): Raymond Ayala
- Producer(s): Luny Tunes

Daddy Yankee singles chronology
"Cójela Que Va Sin Jockey" (2004)	"Aquí Está Tu Caldo" (2004)	"Gasolina" (2004)

"Aquí Está Tu Caldo" is a song by Puerto Rican reggaeton singer-songwriter Daddy Yankee from the 2004 compilation album La Trayectoria. The song was produced by Luny Tunes.

== Charts ==
Chart (2004)	Peak Position
US Tropical Songs (Billboard)	34
US Latin Rhythm Airplay (Billboard)	26
