= TamoEnVivoTour =

2017 concert tour by Daddy Yankee

#TamoEnVivoTour
- Tour by Daddy Yankee
- Promotional poster for the European leg of the tour
- Location: Europe; North America; Asia; South America
- Start date: June 2, 2017
- End date: December 16, 2017
- Legs: 4
- No. of shows: 20 in Europe; 12 in North America; 2 in South America; 1 in Asia; 35 in total

Daddy Yankee concert chronology
- The Kingdom Tour (2015–2016); #TamoEnVivoTour (2017); La Gira Dura (2018)

#TamoEnVivoTour was the eighth headlining concert tour by Puerto Rican artist Daddy Yankee. The tour stated on June 2, 2017 in Mannheim, at SAP Arena, and concluded on December 16, of the same year, in Santo Domingo, at Estadio Olimpico Felix Sanchez. It was his first tour to perform in Europe, since his 2015 King Daddy Tour. This was also his first tour after his blockbuster collaboration, "Despacito", with Luis Fonsi.

== Set list ==
1. Despacito
2. Limbo
3. Moviendo Caderas
4. Sígueme Y Te Sigo
5. Fronteamos Por Que Podemos
6. Pose
7. Guaya (With Arcángel)
8. Quiero Decirte (With Arcángel)
9. La Dupleta (With Arcángel)
10. Gasolina
11. Seguroski (With Don Omar)
12. Taboo RMX (With Don Omar)
13. Ora Por Mi
14. La Nueva Y La Ex
15. Somos De Calle

== Tour dates ==
Date	City	Country	Venue
Europe
June 2, 2017	Mannheim	Germany	SAP Arena
June 3, 2017	ludwigsburg	Germany	MHP-Arena
June 4, 2017	Berlin	Germany	Columbiahalle
June 9, 2017	Napoles	Italy	Ammot Cafè
June 10, 2017	Locarno	Switzerland	Vanilla Club
June 11, 2017	Milan	Italy	Hipódromo de San Siro
June 12, 2017	Cagliari	Italy	Arena Sant`Elia
June 15, 2017	Roma	Italy	Fiesta
June 16, 2017	Amsterdam	Netherlands	The BOX
June 17, 2017	Zurich	Switzerland	Stadthalle Dietikon
June 23, 2017	Toulouse	France	Zénith de Toulouse
June 24, 2017	Paris	France	Zénith de Paris
June 25, 2017	Madrid	Spain	WiZink Center
Asia
June 29, 2017	Tel Avi	Israel	Reggaeton Live Park
Europe
June 30, 2017	Punta Umbria	Spain	Complejo Deportivo
July 1, 2017	Malaga	Spain	Auditorium Municipal de Malaga
July 2, 2017	Barcelona	Spain	Poble Espanyol
July 6, 2017	A Coruna	Spain	Expo Coruña
July 7, 2017	Valencia	Spain	Plaza Toros de Valencia
July 8, 2017	Bree	Belgium	Afro Latino Festival 2017
July 9, 2017 (Note: This concert was co-headlined by the famous latin urban artist Ozuna.)	London	England	SSE Arena
South America
August 10, 2017	Quito	Ecuador	Coliseo General Rumiñahui
August 12, 2017	Guayaquil	Ecuador	Centro de Convenciones de Guayaquil
North America
August 18, 2017	Brampton	Canada	Powerade Center
August 19, 2017	Montreal	Canada	Uniprix Stadium Jarry Park
September 2, 2017	Mauston	United States	Los Dells Festival 2017
September 17, 2017	Vienna	United States	Wolf Trap
September 21, 2017	Brooklyn	United States	Ford Amphitheater at Coney Island Boardwalk
September 22, 2017	Chicago	United States	Aragon Ballroom
September 23, 2017	Mashantucket	United States	Grand Theater at Foxwoods
October 14, 2017 (Note: This performance was part of Elusion Festival 2017.)	Toluca	Mexico	Centro Dinamico Pegaso
October 17, 2017 (Note: This performance was part of the Tidal X festival.)	Brooklyn	United States	Barclays Center
November 12, 2017 (Note: This performance was part of the Latino Mix Live 2017.)	Dallas	United States	American Airlines Center
December 9, 2017 (Note: This concert was part of the Coca-Cola Flow Fest 2017.)	Mexico City	Mexico	Foro Sol
December 16, 2017	Santo Domingo	Dominican Republic	Estadio Olimpico Felix Sanchez

=== Box office data ===
City	Country	Attendance	Box office
Brooklyn	United States	2,630 / 4,889 (54%)	$130,038
Dallas	United States	12,065 / 13,605 (89%)	$1,219,427
Mexico City	Mexico	37,854 / 64,840 (58%)	$1,073,313
Total		52,549 / 83,334 (63%)	$2,422,778
