= Daddy Yankee =

Puerto Rican rapper and singer (born 1976)

- Daddy Yankee at the 2026 Latin Grammy Awards
- Born: Ramón Luis Ayala Rodríguez; February 3, 1976 (age 50); San Juan, Puerto Rico
- Other names: The Big Boss; El Cangri (The Chief); Winchester
- Occupations: Rapper; singer; songwriter
- Years active: 1992–present
- Works: Discography
- Spouse: Mireddys González (m. 1995; sep. 2024)
- Children: 3
- Awards: Full list
- Musical career
- Genres: Reggaeton; Latin hip-hop; urban pop; dancehall
- Labels: El Cartel; VI; Universal Latino; Machete; Interscope; Sony Latin; Capitol Latin; Republic; DY
- Website: daddyyankee.com (in Spanish and English)

Signature
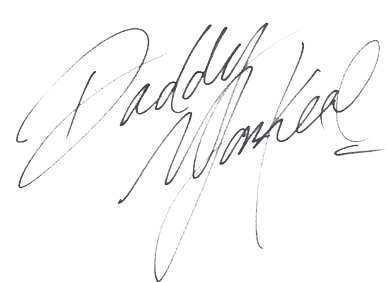

Ramón Luis Ayala Rodríguez (Latin American Spanish: [raˈmon lwis aˈʝala roˈðɾiɣes]; born February 3, 1976), known professionally as Daddy Yankee (Spanish: [ˈdaði ˈʝaŋki]), is a Puerto Rican rapper, singer and songwriter. Dubbed the "King of Reggaeton" and "Godfather of Reggaeton" he is often cited as an influence by other Hispanic urban performers.

Daddy Yankee aspired to become a professional baseball player, but following a shooting incident, he instead pursued a music career. In 1995, he independently released his debut studio album No Mercy. His follow-up, El Cangri.com (2002), was successful in the US. His next studio album, Barrio Fino (2004), became the top-selling Latin music album of the decade of the 2000s. Its most successful single "Gasolina", was nominated for the Latin Grammy Award for Record of the Year. "Gasolina" has been credited with introducing reggaeton to audiences worldwide, and making the music genre a global phenomenon. His next album, El Cartel: The Big Boss (2007), peaked within the top 10 in the Billboard 200.

In 2017, he collaborated with the Latin pop singer Luis Fonsi on the single "Despacito", which became the first Spanish-language song to top the Billboard Hot 100 since "Macarena", in 1996. Its accompanying music video was the most-viewed video on YouTube from August 2017 to November 2020, and is the most liked music video on the platform. Its success led Daddy Yankee to become the most-listened artist worldwide on the streaming service Spotify in June 2017, the first Latin artist to do so. Following the release of his seventh studio album, Legendaddy, and its supporting tour, he announced his retirement from music. Although he concluded his final stage performance on the La Meta tour in Puerto Rico on December 3, 2023, he later returned to music with the release of Lamento en Baile in 2025.

Daddy Yankee is one of the best-selling Latin music artists of all time, having sold over 30 million records worldwide. His accolades include eight Latin Grammy Awards, two Billboard Music Awards, 14 Billboard Latin Music Awards, two Latin American Music Awards, eight Lo Nuestro Awards, an MTV Video Music Award, and six ASCAP Awards. He also received a Puerto Rican Walk of Fame star, special awards by People en Español magazine, and the Presencia Latina at Harvard University. He was named by CNN as the "Most Influential Hispanic Artist" of 2009, and included in Time 100 in 2006.

== Early life ==
Ayala was born in the Río Piedras district of San Juan, Puerto Rico, to Rosa Rodríguez and Ramón Ayala, who is a salsa percussion player. He was raised in the Villa Kennedy Housing Projects neighborhood. He aspired to become a professional baseball player and tried out for the Seattle Mariners of the Major League Baseball (MLB). Before he could be officially signed, he was hit by a stray round from an AK-47 rifle while taking a break from a studio recording session with reggaeton artist DJ Playero. Ayala spent over a year recovering from the wound, but the bullet was never removed from his hip. He later credited the shooting incident with allowing him to focus entirely on a music career.

== Musical career ==
=== 1992–1999: Career beginnings ===
Often considered to be one of the pioneers within the reggaeton genre, Ayala was originally going to become a professional baseball player prior to being shot in the leg while taking a break from a studio recording session - the bullet was never removed. He first appeared on the 1992 DJ Playero's Mixtape, Playero 34, with the song "So' Persigueme, No Te Detengas". Daddy Yankee would then rise to prominence after his appearance on "Playero 37" which includes his first hits "Donde Mi No Vengas" and "Yamilette" which he continued to perform live in concert throughout his career until his recent retirement. His first official studio project as a solo artist was No Mercy, which was released on April 2, 1995, through White Lion Records and BM Records in Puerto Rico. Early in his career he attempted to imitate the rap style of Vico C. He went on to emulate other artists in the genre, including DJ Playero, DJ Nelson, and Tempo taking elements from their styles in order to develop an original style with the Dembow rhythm. In doing so, he eventually abandoned the traditional model of rap and became one of the first artists to perform reggaeton. Throughout the 1990s, Daddy Yankee appeared in several of DJ Playero's underground mixtapes which were banned by the Puerto Rican government due to explicit lyrics; these songs would later be among the first reggaeton songs ever produced.

=== 2000–2003: Early music and El Cangri.com ===
In 1997, Daddy Yankee collaborated with the rapper Nas, who was an inspiration for Ayala, in the song "The Profecy", for the album Boricua Guerrero. He released two compilation albums with original material: El Cartel (1997) and El Cartel II (2001). Both albums were successful in Puerto Rico, but not throughout Latin America. Between those years, Daddy Yankee released a total of nine music videos, including "Posición" featuring Alberto Stylee, "Tu Cuerpo en la Cama" featuring Nicky Jam, and "Muévete y Perrea". In 2000, Daddy Yankee formed an unofficial duo called "Los Cangris" with Nicky Jam and released several successful singles together. Yankee and Nicky Jam fell apart in 2004 due to personal issues and creative differences. In 2012, Daddy Yankee and Nicky Jam reconciled and performed in various concerts together.

In 2002, El Cangri.com became Daddy Yankee's first album with international success, receiving coverage in the markets of New York City and Miami with hits including "Latigazo", "Son las Doce", "Guayando" and other songs like "Enciende", which talks about different social problems of the era, mentioning 9/11, corruption and religion. In 2003, Daddy Yankee released a compilation album named Los Homerun-es, which contains his first charted single ("Segurosqui"), five new songs and 12 remakes of DJ Playero's albums songs. that was later charted, "Seguroski", being his first charted single after six of them. In 2003, Daddy Yankee collaborated for the first time with the prestigious reggaeton producers Luny Tunes on the album Mas Flow, with his commercial success song "Cógela Que Va Sin Jockey" (a.k.a. "Métele con Candela"), and Mas Flow 2.

=== 2004–2006: Barrio Fino and "Gasolina" ===
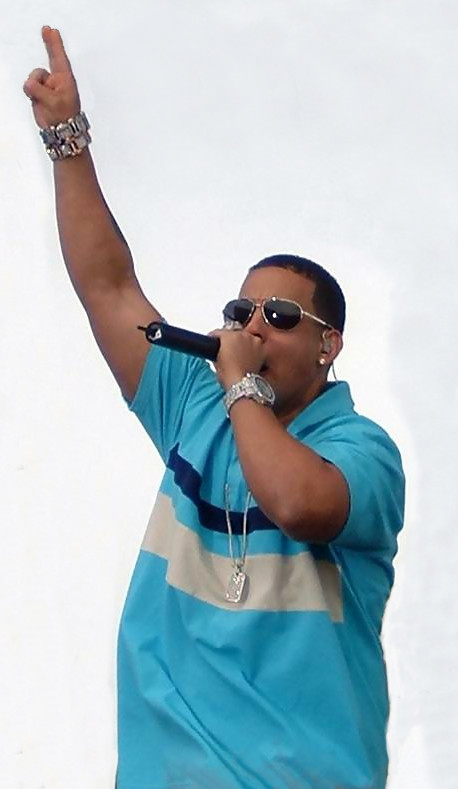
Daddy Yankee during a concert in 2006

Daddy Yankee's next album, Barrio Fino, was produced by Luny Tunes and DJ Nelson among others and released in July 2004 by El Cartel Records and VI Music. It was the most highly anticipated album in the reggaeton community. Daddy Yankee had enjoyed salsa music since he was young, and this led him to include music of genres besides reggaeton in the album. The most prominent of these cross-genre singles was "Melao", in which he performed with Andy Montañez. The album was described as his most complete, and with it he intended to introduce combinations of reggaeton and other genres to the English-speaking market. Barrio Fino was followed up by an international tour with performances in numerous countries including the Dominican Republic, Ecuador, Mexico, Panama, Peru, Honduras, Spain, Colombia, Argentina, Venezuela, and the United States. The album has sold over 1.1 millions of copies in the United States alone, making it the seventh best-selling Latin album in the country according to Nielsen SoundScan. Also, It had sold over 2 million copies throughout Latin America and worldwide.

During this same time, Daddy Yankee was featured in N.O.R.E.'s single "Oye Mi Canto" which hit number 12 on the Billboard Hot 100 chart; a record for a reggaeton single at the time. Other successful featured singles included "Mayor Que Yo" and "Los 12 Discípulos".

In 2005, Daddy Yankee won several international awards, making him one of the most recognized reggaeton artists within the music industry. The first award of the year was Lo Nuestro Awards within the "Album of the Year" category, which he received for Barrio Fino. In this event he performed "Gasolina" in a performance that was described as "innovative". Barrio Fino also won the "Reggaeton Album of the Year" award in the Latin Billboard that took place on April 28, 2005, where he performed a mix of three of his songs in a duet with P. Diddy. The album was promoted throughout Latin America, the United States, and Europe, reaching certified gold in Japan. Due to the album's success, Daddy Yankee received promotional contracts with radio stations and soda companies, including Pepsi. His hit single, "Gasolina", received the majority of votes cast for the second edition of Premios Juventud, in which it received eight nominations and won seven awards. Daddy Yankee also made a live presentation during the award ceremony. "Gasolina" received nominations in the Latin Grammy and MTV Video Music Awards. The commercial success of "Gasolina" in the United States led to the creation of a new radio format and a Billboard chart: Latin Rhythm Airplay. According to Nestor Casonu, CEO of Casonu Strategic Management, "Daddy Yankee and 'Gasolina' triggered the explosion of urban Latin music worldwide".

The successful single, "Gasolina", was covered by artists from different music genres. This led to a controversy when "Los Lagos", a Mexican banda group, did a cover with the original beat but changed the song's lyrics. The group's label had solicited the copyright permission to perform the single and translate it to a different music style, but did not receive consent to change the lyrics; legal action followed. Speaking for the artist, Daddy Yankee's lawyer stated that having his song covered was an "honor, but it must be done the right way."

On December 13, 2005, he released Barrio Fino en Directo, a live record and the follow-up of Barrio Fino. The album sold more than in 800,000 copies in the United States, becoming the 13th best-selling Latin album in the US according to Nielsen SoundScan and over 3 million of copies worldwide.

On April 30, 2006, Daddy Yankee was named one of the 100 most influential people by Time, which cited the 2 million copies of Barrio Fino sold, Daddy Yankee's $20 million contract with Interscope Records, and his Pepsi endorsement.

During this period, Daddy Yankee and William Omar Landrón (more commonly known by his artistic name Don Omar) were involved in a rivalry within the genre, dubbed "tiraera". The rivalry received significant press coverage despite being denied early on by both artists. It originated with a lyrical conflict between the artists begun by Daddy Yankee's comments in a remix single, where he criticized Landron's common usage of the nickname "King of Kings". Don Omar responded to this in a song titled "Ahora Son Mejor", in his album Los Rompediscotecas.

=== 2007–2009: El Cartel: The Big Boss and Talento de Barrio ===
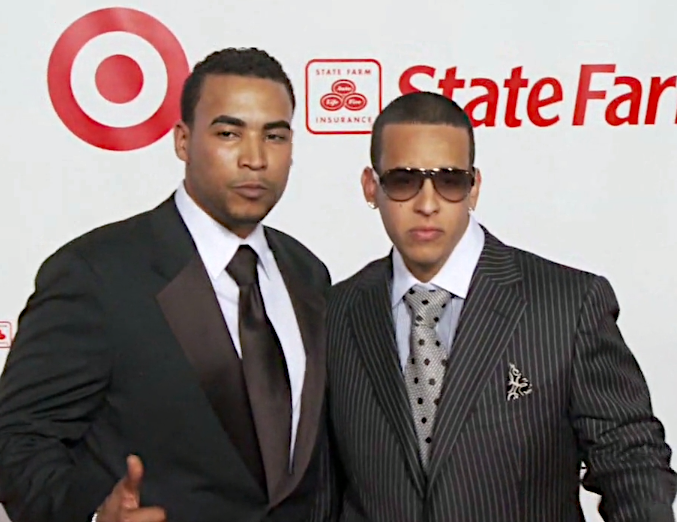
Don Omar (left) and Daddy Yankee at the 2009 Latin Billboard Music Awards red carpet

El Cartel: The Big Boss was released by Interscope on June 5, 2007. Daddy Yankee stated that the album marked a return to his hip-hop roots as opposed to being considered a strictly reggaeton album. The album was produced in 2006, and included the participation of will.i.am, Scott Storch, Tainy Tunes, Neli, and personnel from Daddy Yankee's label. Singles were produced with Héctor el Father, Fergie, Nicole Scherzinger and Akon. The first single from the album was titled "Impacto", and was released prior to the completion of the album. The album was promoted by a tour throughout the United States, which continued throughout Latin America. He performed in Mexico, first in Monterrey, where 10,000 attended the concert, and later at San Luis Potosí coliseum, where the concert sold out, leaving hundreds of fans outside the building. Daddy Yankee performed in Chile as well, and established a record for attendance in Ecuador. He also performed in Bolivia, setting another record when 50,000 fans attended his Santa Cruz de la Sierra concert. This show was later described as "the best show with the biggest attendance in history" and as "somehappy that his album had sold more than those of Juan Luis Guerra and Juanes, and that this was an "official proof that reggaeton's principal exponent defeated the rest of the genres".

Between 2007 and 2008, Daddy Yankee made several guest appearances in famous reggaeton compilation albums including Caribbean Connection, Echo Presenta: Invasión, Mas Flow: Los Benjamins, and 20 Number 1's Now.

He appeared on the 2008 Rockstar Games' video game Grand Theft Auto IV as the DJ of Radio San Juan Sounds, with spanglish lines. The radio includes reggaeton songs from Daddy Yankee's colleagues, like Wisin & Yandel, Héctor el Father, Tito El Bambino and Jowell & Randy. San Juan Sounds also featured Daddy Yankee's hit "Impacto".

In July 2008, Daddy Yankee announced that as part of his work, he would produce a cover version of Thalía's song, "Ten Paciencia". On August 17, 2008, his soundtrack album Talento De Barrio for the eponymous film was released. Prior to the album's release, Daddy Yankee scheduled several activities, including an in-store contract signing. The album was awarded as Multi-Platinum by RIAA on April 17, 2009. On February 27, 2009, he performed at the Viña del Mar International Song Festival in Chile. In this event, the artists receive awards based on the public's reaction. After performing "Rompe", "Llamado de emergencia", "Ella Me Levantó", "Gasolina", "Limpia Parabrisas" and "Lo Que Pasó, Pasó" over the course of two hours, Daddy Yankee received the "Silver Torch", "Gold Torch" and "Silver Seagull" recognitions. On April 24, 2009, he received the Spirit of Hope Award as part of the Latin Billboard Music Awards ceremony. The recognition is given to the artists that participate in their community or social efforts throughout the year.

=== 2009–2013: Mundial and Prestige ===
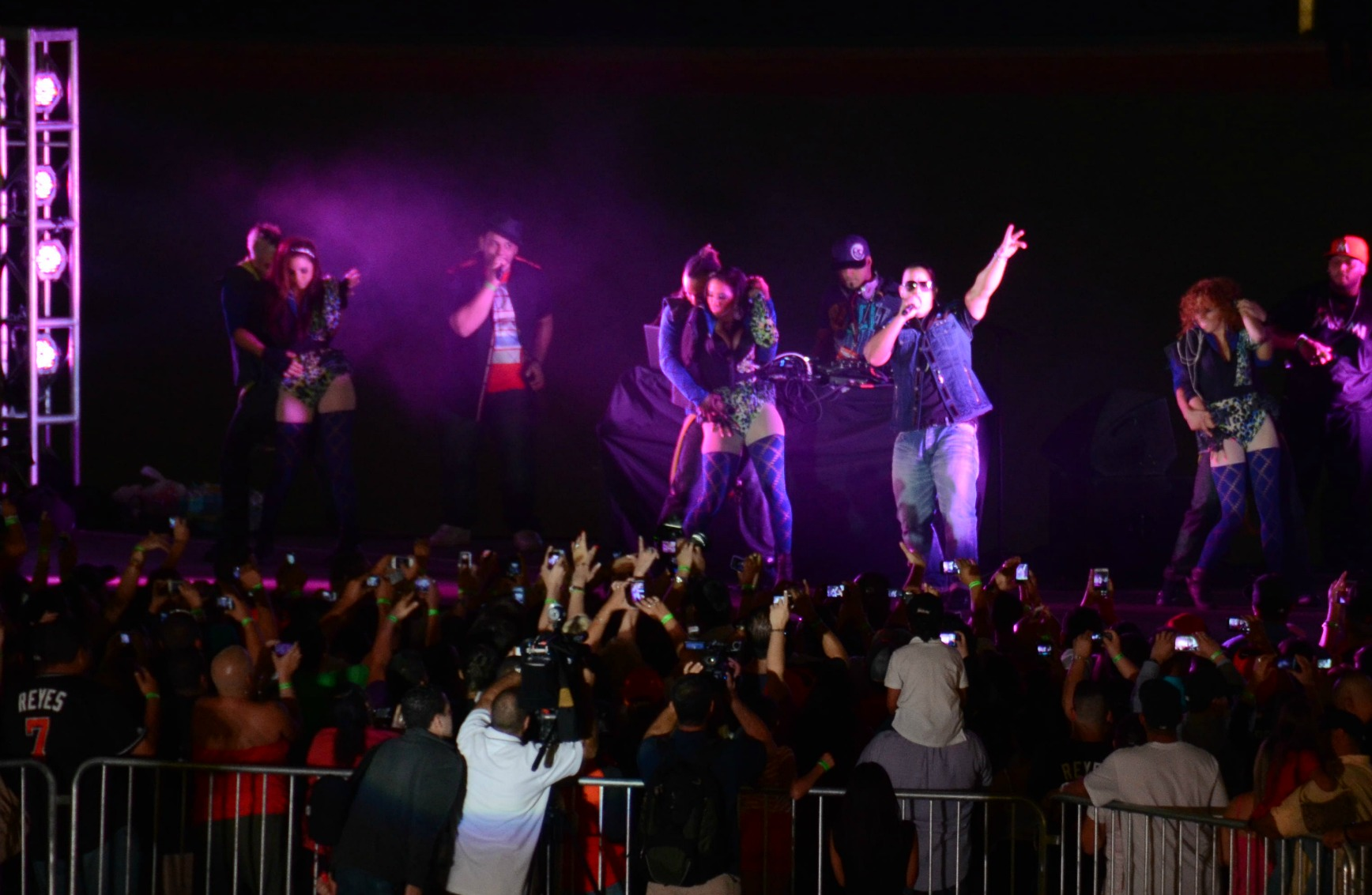
Daddy Yankee in a post-game concert at Marlins Park in 2012

The single, "Grito Mundial", was released on October 8, 2009, in order to promote his ninth album, Mundial. The song was going to be the official theme for the 2010 FIFA World Cup, but Daddy Yankee rejected the FIFA offer, which gave them 100% of the rights. Despite releasing "El Ritmo No Perdona (Prende)" more than a month before, that single was not considered the first official promotional single. The second single, "Descontrol", was released on January 12, 2010, and topped the Billboard Latin Rhythm Airplay. The music video was filmed in New York City and was released on May 17, 2010. "La Despedida" was the third single, released on August 4, 2010. The song reached number four in both Billboard Top Latin Songs and Latin Pop Songs. Other songs, like "Bailando Fue" (featuring Jowell & Randy) and "Échale Pique" (featuring Yomo) were not included in Mundial.

In 2010, Daddy Yankee participated in the song "Somos El Mundo 25 Por Haiti", by providing the rap vocals alongside rapper Pitbull.

Daddy Yankee's sixth studio album, Prestige was released on September 11, 2012. It was scheduled to be released on November or December 2011, but a hurricane damaged El Cartel Records and half of the album was lost. The lost tracks had to be reworked and was finally released nine months later. The first single, "Ven Conmigo", featuring bachata singer Prince Royce, was released on April 12, 2011, and peaked at number 9 on the Billboard Latin Charts. The second single, "Lovumba", was released on October 4, 2011, and was a number one hit on the Billboard Latin Charts and the Latin Songs chart. It was also nominated for Best Urban Song at the 2012 Latin Grammy Awards. The third single, "Pasarela", was released on June 20, 2012. The album peaked at number 39 on the Billboard 200, number one on both the Billboard Latin Albums and Latin Rhythm Albums charts. It also peaked at number five on the Billboard Rap Albums chart. The fourth and last single, Limbo, was released with the album. The song had a great success, reaching three number one Billboard charts (Hot Latin Song, Latin Pop Song and Latin Rhythm Airplay) and having more than 1.5 billion views on YouTube. The album was certified as Gold by the RIAA on March 8, 2013.

The year 2012 had one of the most important genre events of the year: the reconciliation between Daddy Yankee and Wisin & Yandel, after some years of rivalry. Six years after their last collaboration, Daddy Yankee appeared on the duo's remix song "Hipnotízame", with positive acclaim from fans. Two months later, on February 16, 2013, Wisin & Yandel collaborated in the remix of "Limbo". Later in 2013, the three artists performed songs like "Hipnotízame", "Mayor Que Yo" and "Noche de Entierro" in two concerts (one in Puerto Rico and another in Colombia).

On February 25, 2013, Daddy Yankee performed in the 2013 Viña del Mar International Song Festival, to a sold-out audience. He performed hits like "Limbo", "Gasolina", "Pose", "Ella Me Levantó" and "Descontrol". He won the Silver and Golden Torch and the Silver and Golden Seagull recognitions. In 2013, Daddy Yankee performed on his Prestige World Tour, touring several countries in Europe including, Spain, Germany, France and Italy. He has also toured in Colombia, Peru, Chile to sold-out audiences. In 2013 he released music videos of "El Amante" featuring J Alvarez, "Summertime" and "Noche de los Dos" featuring Natalia Jimenez, with millions of views on YouTube.

=== 2013–2015: King Daddy ===
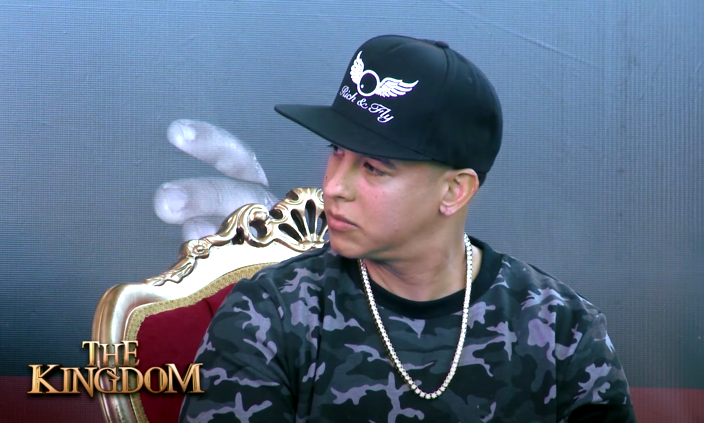
Daddy Yankee during an interview in 2015

On October 29, 2013, Daddy Yankee released a mixtape entitled "King Daddy", produced by Los de la Nazza (Musicólogo & Menes), as part the Imperio Nazza Mixtapes series and was released as a digital-format only. The mixtape was made because of the high demand from the fans and is a return to his original reggaeton roots. It includes 11 tracks with collaborations from J Alvarez, Arcángel, Yandel, Farruko, and Divino. According to Daddy Yankee, "King Daddy" was recorded in two and a half weeks, because there was "a lot of inspiration". The song "La Rompe Carros" has garnered popularity among the public, but his hit single was "La Nueva y La Ex" which has been widely received all over South America, Europe, and North America. During a press conference earlier this year, Daddy Yankee announced the physical release of King Daddy scheduled for later this year with 3 or 4 bonus tracks for a total of 14 or 15 songs included.

From May 13 to June 22, 2014, Daddy Yankee performed on his King Daddy Tour, touring several cities in Europe. He has also toured in South and North American cities. In Spain, his concerts were on the 4º position in the box-office ranking, being the first Latin artist on the top 5 in this country, underneath Iron Maiden and the Rolling Stones, and over artists like Beyoncé, Miley Cyrus and Michael Bublé.

On June 17, 2014, the single "Ora por Mí" (Spanish for "Pray for Me") was released as part of the King Daddy's bonus tracks and uses the Scorpions' "Send Me An Angel" instrumental, with a rap sampler. The official video for "Ora Por Mí" was released on June 24, 2014. It was filmed in many locations in San Juan, Puerto Rico, and talks about Ayala's life and the dark side of fame. According to Daddy Yankee, it is the most personal song of his career. On September 2, 2014, it was released another single called "Palabras Con Sentido" (Spanish for "Words With Sentiments"), which defends reggaeton and urban music of all the accusations of being a "society poison". Daddy Yankee expressed that all music has something good to give, even urban music. On his single, he also says that urban music saves lives, like his own, and the solution would be that churches have to remain, journalists have to tell the truth, artists have to have more inspiration, and the rich people have to help the poor ones. On September 9, 2014, he released his first totally English single called "This Is Not A Love Song" featuring new rapper Duncan.

=== 2016–2023: Continued success, "Despacito", Legendaddy and retirement ===
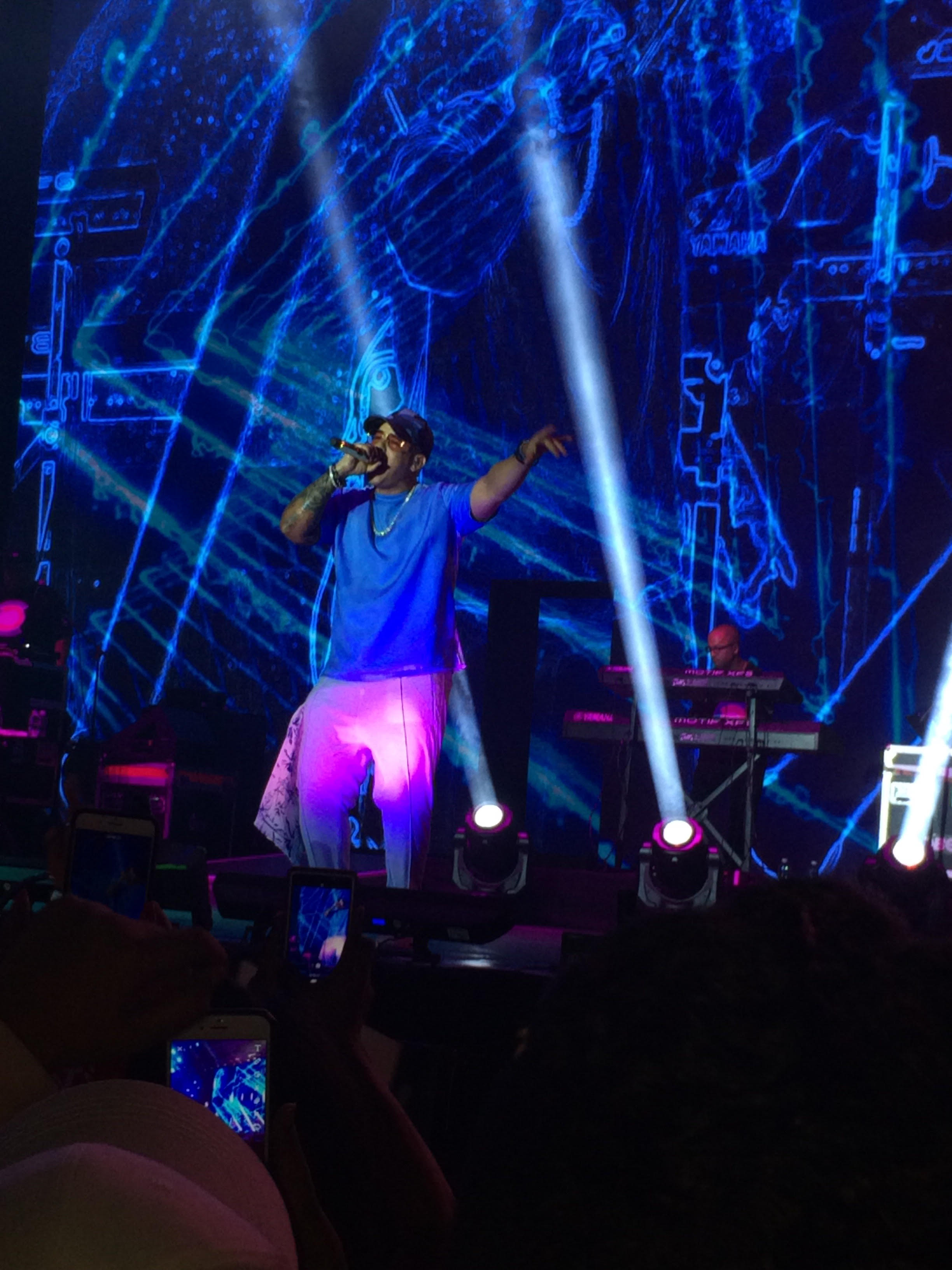
Daddy Yankee during a concert in Honduras, 2019

On April 28, 2016, Daddy Yankee was awarded the "Industry Leader Award" during the 2016 Latin Billboard Awards. After a decade-long feud with longtime rival Don Omar for the "King of Reggaeton" title, in early 2016 Daddy Yankee and Don Omar announced in a Billboard press conference that they would perform together on stage in a concert series called The Kingdom Tour. The tour announcement left many fans in disbelief as it sold out in minutes in major cities like Las Vegas, Orlando, Los Angeles, New York. The concerts were structured like a boxing match, where the two artists got to trade off musical rounds, and fans voted for their winner in each city via an app designed for the event. "Two kings, one throne", said Pina Records founder Rafael Pina, who had a well-established relationship with both artists, and who also came up with the idea for the tour concept. Discussing the tour and his rivalry with Daddy Yankee, Don Omar said "Let me clarify: I am not his best friend, and he is not my best friend, but we respect each other. That desire to be the best is what has pushed us to be better."

In 2017, Daddy Yankee, in collaboration with Latin pop singer Luis Fonsi, released the hit single "Despacito". It became the first Spanish-language song to hit number 1 on the Billboard Hot 100 since "Macarena" in 1996. The single gained global success. The official video for "Despacito" on YouTube received its billionth view on April 20, 2017, after 97 days, becoming the second-fastest video on the site to reach the milestone behind Adele's "Hello". Its success led Daddy Yankee to become the most listened artist worldwide on the streaming service Spotify in June 2017, being the first Latin artist to do so.

In early 2018, Daddy Yankee released his first Latin trap singles with the song "Hielo", and on the single "Vuelve" on which he collaborated with Bad Bunny. In August 2018, Daddy Yankee collaborated with Janet Jackson on her return to music on the song "Made for Now". He released the 2019 single "Con Calma", a reimagination of Snow's 1992 hit single "Informer". Snow recorded new parts and the Spanish-language remake topped the charts of 20 countries and reached the top 10 in 10 others.

On March 21, 2022, Daddy Yankee announced his seventh and final studio album Legendaddy, which released on March 24, alongside its supporting tour, due to run from August to December. He also announced that he planned on retiring from music after completing the tour. On January 26, 2023, Rauw Alejandro released the single "Panties y Brasieres" with Yankee. On February 17, Yankee released the single "La Hora y el Día" with Justin Quiles and Dalex. On June 2, Yankee released the single "Beachy" with Omar Courtz. On June 16, Yandel released the single "Yankee 150" with Feid and Yankee. On June 26, Tainy released the single "La Baby" with Yankee, Feid and Sech. His final concert was on December 4, in San Juan. He later shared a post on Instagram confirming his retirement.

=== 2024–present: Standalone releases ===
On March 29, 2024, Yankee released the single "Donante de Sangre". On May 3, Yankee released the single "Loveo". On September 27, Yankee released the single "Bailando en la Lluvia".

In January 2025, Yankee released the standalone single "En el Desierto".

On July 9, 2025, Yankee uploaded a teaser featuring American actor Anthony Ramos, who asks Daddy Yankee if he's ready, to which he replies, "I'm back.". The next day, he released "Sonríele", under Hybe Latin America.

On October 16, 2025, Yankee released the unapologetically Christian album Lamento en Baile.

On November 5, 2025, as a part of Argentine producer Bizarrap's BZRP Music Sessions, he released Bzrp Music Sessions, Vol. #0/66. This marked a return from a 10-month hiatus for the series.

In October 2026, Yankee released his tenth studio album, La Postal, featuring guest appearances from Cardi B, Myke Towers, Danny Ocean and Diljit Dosanjh.

== Film and other career projects ==
Ayala has negotiated promotional deals with several companies outside of the music industry, releasing merchandise under his name. In 2005, he became the first Latin artist to sign a deal with Reebok, in order to produce accessories, including the licensed clothing line "DY", which was released in 2006. He also teamed up with the company to have his own shoes and sporting goods made, which were first distributed on May 23, 2006. Reebok continued the partnership with the introduction of the Travel Trainer collection in July 2007. In August 2007, Pepsi began an advertising campaign titled "Puertas", in which Ayala is depicted returning to his youth by opening a series of doors.

Ayala has worked in the film industry as both an actor and producer. His acting debut was as an extra in the 2004 film Vampiros, directed by Eduardo Ortiz and filmed in Puerto Rico. The film premiered at the Festival of Latin American Cinema in New York, where it received a positive reaction. This led Image Entertainment to produce a DVD, internationally released in March 2005. Ayala played the main role, "Edgar Dinero", in Talento de Barrio, which was filmed in Puerto Rico and directed by José Iván Santiago. Ayala produced the film, which is based on his experience of growing up in a poor city neighborhood. While the film is not directly a biography, Ayala has stated that it mirrors his early life. Talento de Barrio's debut was scheduled for July 23, 2008, in New York's Latino Film Festival. After the premier, Ayala expressed satisfaction, saying that he had been invited to audition for other producers. On release, Talento de Barrio broke the record held by Maldeamores for the most tickets to a Puerto Rican movie sold in a single day in Caribbean Cinemas.

Ayala has been involved in the administration of three organizations, the first being El Cartel Records which he co-owns with Andres Hernandez. He also created the Fundación Corazón Guerrero, a charitable organization in Puerto Rico which works with young incarcerated people. On April 26, 2008, he was presented with a "Latino of the Year Award" by the student organization Presencia Latina of Harvard College, receiving it for his work with Puerto Rican youth and creating Corazón Guerrero. On February 6, 2008, Ayala announced in a Baloncesto Superior Nacional press conference that he had bought part of the Criollos de Caguas' ownership. He has also been active with Cruz Roja Puerto Rico in several media campaigns.

In March 2013, Daddy Yankee talked about a new movie production during an interview in Las Vegas. During an interview in a radio station in January 2014, Ayala announced the film, but he only mentioned that many reggaeton exponents would take part of it. In February 2014 it was confirmed that the movie would be about the boxer Macho Camacho's life. According to Ayala, he had the boxer's support to film the movie, but it remained unreleased after Camacho's death on November 24, 2012. The film was due for release in 2015.

The most recent of Daddy Yankee's non-music projects was the release of his game Trylogy, a 3D video game based in tower defense games. The game was presented at the New York Comic Con and was released on November 29, 2013. The game also features Ayala's songs like "Gasolina" and "Limbo".

Daddy Yankee served as an executive producer of Neon, A Netflix series about three friends who move from a small town in Florida to Miami with the hopes of making it big in the reggaeton world. Daddy Yankee also made a cameo in the show. The series premiered in 2023.

== Personal life ==
=== Family ===
Ayala has kept most of his personal life private, rarely speaking about it in interviews. He has said that he avoids doing so because such details are the only aspect of his life that are not public and that they are like a "little treasure." In 2006 he spoke about his relationship with his wife, Mireddys González, and children in an interview with María Celeste Arrarás in Al Rojo Vivo. He stated that his marriage is strong because he and his wife are "friends above anything" and that he has tried to ignore other temptations because "weakness is the reason for the downfall of several artists." He met his wife when they were young teens, and, at 17 years old, the couple decided to wed. Their first daughter, Yamilette Ayala González, was born soon after. He has described becoming a father at 17 as being confusing at first, adding that raising a daughter at that age was a hard experience. He has another daughter, Jesaaelys, born in 1996, and a son, Jeremy, born in 1998. On December 1, 2024, Ayala revealed on his Instagram page that he and his wife were divorcing after nearly 30 years of marriage. Amid divorce proceedings, Ayala filed an injunction against Mireddys, claiming that she withdrew $100 million from his business accounts without authorization.

=== Political views ===
In 2008, Ayala participated in a campaign to promote voting in the 2008 general elections in Puerto Rico. This initiative included a concert titled "Vota o quédate callado" (Vote or Remain Silent).

On August 25, 2008, Ayala endorsed John McCain of the Republican Party in the 2008 United States presidential election, stating that McCain was a "fighter for the Hispanic community". As part of this campaign, Ayala moderated a debate titled "Vota o quédate callado: los candidatos responden a los jóvenes", which was aired on October 9, 2008.

In November 2019, Ayala inaugurated a museum of reggaeton at Plaza Las Américas, the first of its kind.

=== Philanthropy ===
In 2007, Daddy Yankee became the spokesperson of the environmental organization "Yo Limpio a Puerto Rico" (I Clean Puerto Rico) founded by Ignacio Barsottelli. Yo Limpio a Puerto Rico, PepsiCo and Wal-Mart announced a joint effort to promote recycling in Puerto Rico among the general public and schools across the island with the campaign "Tómatelo en Serio, Recicla por Puerto Rico" (Take it seriously, recycle for Puerto Rico), in which Daddy Yankee became the main spokesperson. This campaign incorporated a recycling contest among public and private schools from around the island in the elementary, junior high, and high school categories. The program established 16 recycling centers located at Wal-Mart and Sam's Club stores across the island, where consumers were able to deposit recyclable items.

In 2017, Daddy Yankee donated $100,000 to the Food Bank of Puerto Rico after the devastation caused by Hurricane Maria. The money provided food to roughly 9,000 families on the island.

Daddy Yankee presented the HR Derby Champ medallion to Pete Alonso upon his winning the MLB HR Derby on July 8, 2019.

=== Beliefs ===
In December 2023, during his tour at the Coliseo de Puerto Rico, he announced that he had become Christian and wanted to serve in evangelization. On November 16, 2025, during the half-time show of Dolphins vs Commanders played in Madrid, Spain he praised: God bless Spain, Jesus is the Way, the Truth and the Life ("Dios bendiga a España, Jesús es el Camino, la Verdad y la Vida.")

== Legacy ==
Daddy Yankee has been dubbed "King of Reggaeton" by media. Rachel Grace Almeida from Vice felt Daddy Yankee paved the way with his music to amplify and normalize the "marginalised" Latino identity. She also commented that Yankee played a vital part in "bringing glamour to the barrio and challenged the mainstream media's portrayal of Hispanic poverty in those neighbourhoods". He was highlighted by CNN and Time as one of the most influential Hispanics in the world. Roy Trakin from Pollstar considered his collaboration with Luis Fonsi in "Despacito" helped "turn his native Puerto Rico's music into a global phenomenon".

Daddy Yankee's third studio album Barrio Fino (2004) ushered reggaeton into the mainstream. Its single "Gasolina" "[altered] the business, sound and aesthetic of Latin music", stated Billboard, "the genre would revive sales of Latin music, usher in a new radio format in the U.S. (Latin Rhythm Airplay) and establish the urban base responsible for many Latin radio hits today." According to Nestor Casonú, president for Kobalt Music Latin America, "Daddy Yankee and 'Gasolina' triggered the explosion of urban Latin music worldwide."

In 2006, a New York Times article deemed him "The King of Reggaeton" while commenting on 2004's music revenue, "one bright spot for the music industry was Latin music: sales grew by 12 percent, according to Nielsen SoundScan. At least some of that success is owed to reggaeton and by extension to Daddy Yankee, its top-selling act."

Multiple artists have cited him as an inspiration, including J Balvin, Ozuna, Bad Bunny, Tini, Lunay, Miguelito, and Natti Natasha.

== Achievements ==
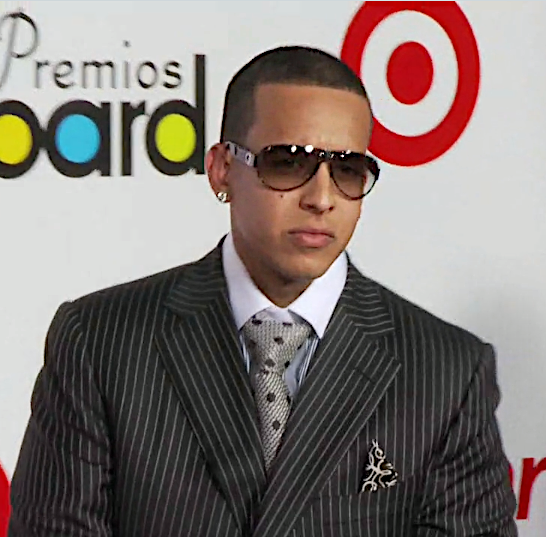
Daddy Yankee at 2009 Latin Billboard Music Awards red carpet. He was honored that night with the Spirit of Hope Award for his humanitarian achievements.

Daddy Yankee has received several awards and honors, including 10 Guinness World Records and seven Billboard Music Awards (the most for any Latin artist). He was honored with the Icon Award by Latin American Music Awards, the Industry Leader Award from the Latin Billboard Awards and inducted into its Hall of Fame, and received the Lifetime Achievement Award in Lo Nuestro Awards from Balvin. J Balvin stated: "Reggaeton would not be what it is without Daddy Yankee and without Yankee, there would be no Balvin".

Having sold 30 million records worldwide, Yankee is one of the best-selling Latin music artists. As of April 2020, Daddy Yankee is the most subscribed Latin artist on YouTube Music. He also is the first Latin act to be the most listened-to artist worldwide, and remains on Top 20 as of April 2020. In 2019, he set a new record in his country as the artist with the most shows at Coliseum of Puerto Rico, with 12 consecutive sold-out concerts.

Yankee has multiple charts records. He is the artist with the most number one and most entries on the Billboard Latin Rhythm Airplay. He also has the most entries on the Latin Pop Airplay and the second most entries on Hot Latin Songs. Additionally, he achieved three and six top 25 and top 50 Spanish-language singles on the Billboard Hot 100, respectively, the most by any artist. Barrio Fino and Barrio Fino en Directo are two of the best-selling Latin albums in the United States.

With "Despacito", both Yankee and Luis Fonsi achieved multiple worldwide records, including the most-viewed YouTube video (and it became the first video on the site to reach the milestones of three, four, five, six, and seven billion views) and the first Latin song to receive a diamond certification by Recording Industry Association of America (RIAA). Additionally, "Despacito" received thirteen-times platinum by RIAA for units of over 13 million sales plus track-equivalent streams, making it then the highest-certified single in the United States. It also became the song with most weeks at number one in Switzerland and Germany, and the most weeks at number one on Hot Latin Songs.

== Discography ==
=== Studio albums ===
- No Mercy (1995)
- El Cangri.com (2002)
- Barrio Fino (2004)
- El Cartel: The Big Boss (2007)
- Talento de Barrio (2008)
- Mundial (2010)
- Prestige (2012)
- Legendaddy (2022)
- Lamento en Baile (2025)
- La Postal (2026)

== Concert tours ==
As a headliner

- Barrio Fino World Tour (2004–06)
- The Big Boss Tour (2007–09)
- Talento de Barrio Tour (2009)
- Mundial Tour (2010–11)
- European Tour (2012)
- Prestige World Tour (2013–14)
- King Daddy Tour (2014–15)
- #TamoEnVivoTour (2017)
- La Gira Dura (2018)
- Con Calma Tour (2019)
- La Última Vuelta World Tour (2022)

As a co-headliner

- The Kingdom Tour (2015–16) (with Don Omar)

== Filmography ==
Film

Year	Title	Role	Note
2004	Vampiros	Bimbo	Extra
2007	Straight Outta Puerto Rico	Himself	Documentary
2008	Talento de barrio	Edgar "Dinero"	Main role and executive producer

Television

Year	Title	Role	Note
2010	The Bold and the Beautiful	Himself	Recurring role
2015	Hell's Kitchen	Himself	Guest diner; Episode: "14 Chefs Compete"

== See also ==
- Reggaeton
- Music of Latin America
- List of Afro-Latinos
- List of best-selling Latin music artists
- List of Caribbean music genres
- List of Puerto Ricans
- List of Puerto Rican songwriters
- Urban contemporary music
