= Con Calma Tour =

2019 concert tour by Daddy Yankee

- Tour by Daddy Yankee
- Promotional poster for the tour
- Location: South America; North America; Europe; Asia
- Start date: March 8, 2019
- End date: December 29, 2019
- Legs: 4
- No. of shows: 15 in Europe; 15 in North America; 8 in South America; 1 in Asia; 45 in total
- Attendance: 400,000+
- Box office: US $20 million+

Daddy Yankee concert chronology
- La Gira Dura (2018); Con Calma Tour (2019); La Última Vuelta World Tour (2022)

The Con Calma Tour was the tenth headlining concert tour by Puerto Rican rapper Daddy Yankee. The tour name references his 2019 hit single "Con Calma". It began on March 8, 2019, in Santiago at Movistar Arena and concluded on December 29, of the same year, in San Juan at Coliseo de Puerto Rico.

== Set list ==
1. Con Calma
2. Hielo
3. Llegamos A La Disco
4. Vaivén
5. El Combo Me Llama 2 (With Benny Benni)
6. Azukita
7. Rompe
8. Yo Nunca Me Quedo Atras/Yamilette/Donde Mi No Vengas/Ya Va Sonando
9. Vuelve (With Bad Bunny)
10. El Ritmo No Perdona

== Commercial response ==
In the first leg in Chile, concerts were reported sold out and the remaining concerts received good attendance. In the European leg, Madrid, Amsterdam, Tel Aviv, London and Paris concerts were reported sold out. Yankee become the first reggaeton artist ever to have sold out the O2 arena and the AccorHotels Arena.

In December 2019, he announced his concerts in his native Puerto Rico with the name Con Calma Pal Choli. This was his first tour as a headliner in the Coliseo de Puerto Rico since the 2007 Big Boss World Tour. Owing the high demand, it ends with a record-breaking twelve sold-out shows and more than 170,000 tickets sold. and with US$6 million gross, and $14 million in ticket sales. All the shows were sold out in just hours. Because of this, Daddy Yankee broke the record for the most consecutive shows in the arena, previously hold by Wisin & Yandel with nine.

== Critical reception ==
Caroline Sullivan from the guardian gave a positive review with 4 out of 5 stars and stated "a jubilantly Latino Saturday night blowout". Also, she mentioned in the article "The reggaeton maestro flirted his way through a triumphant set in which language was no barrier to enjoying the party".

== Tour dates ==
| Date | City | Country | Venue |
South America
| March 8, 2019 | Santiago | Chile | Movistar Arena |
| March 9, 2019 | Santiago | Chile | Movistar Arena |
| March 13, 2019 | Corrientes | Argentina | Anfiteatro Mario del Transito Cocomarola |
| March 15, 2019 | Buenos Aires | Argentina | Estadio GEBA |
| March 16, 2019 | Asuncion | Paraguay | Estadio General Pablo Rojas |
North America
| April 13, 2019 (Note: This concert was co-headlined by Natti Natasha.) | Tegucigalpa | Honduras | Estadio Chochi Sosa |
| April 17, 2019 | Guatemala City | Guatemala | Explanada Cardales de Cayala |
| April 20, 2019 | Escuintla | Guatemala | Autopista Puerto Quetzal |
Europe
| May 31, 2019 | Brussels | Belgium | Palais 12 |
| June 1, 2019 | Fuengirola | Spain | Marenostrum |
| June 2, 2019 | Madrid | Spain | WiZink Center |
| June 5, 2019 | Sicily | Italy | Zouk Spazio Eventi |
| June 7, 2019 | Zürich | Switzerland | Samsung Hall |
| June 8, 2019 | Paris | France | AccorHotels Arena |
| June 9, 2019 | Naples | Italy | Ex Base N.A.T.O |
| June 13, 2019 | Kraków | Poland | Tauron Arena |
| June 14, 2019 (Note: This concert was part of Flow Fest 2019.) | Seville | Spain | Polideportivo San Pablo |
| June 16, 2019 | Ibiza | Spain | Ushuaïa |
| June 20, 2019 | Milan | Italy | Milano Latin Festival |
| June 21, 2019 | Barletta | Italy | Moat of the Castle of Barletta |
| June 22, 2019 | London | England | The O_{2} Arena |
| June 23, 2019 | Ibiza | Spain | Ushuaïa |
Asia
| June 26, 2019 | Tel Aviv | Israel | Live Park Rishon LeZion |
Europe
| June 29, 2019 | Las Palmas | Spain | Estadio Gran Canaria |
North America
| July 6, 2019 | Montreal | Canada | Beach Club |
| July 19, 2019 | San Pedro Sula | Honduras | Estadio General Francisco Morazán |
| July 20, 2019 | San Jose | Costa Rica | Estadio Ricardo Saprissa Aymá |
| September 13, 2019 | Las Vegas | United States | The Cosmopolitan of Las Vegas |
| September 14, 2019 | Ontario | United States | Toyota Arena |
South America
| October 3, 2019 | Bogota | Colombia | Movistar Arena |
| October 4, 2019 | Envigado | Colombia | Parque Estadio Polideportivo Sur |
North America
| October 24, 2019 | Panama City | Panama | Estadio Rommel Fernández |
| November 2, 2019 (Note: This concert was part of the iHeartRadio Fiesta Latina 2019.) | Miami | United States | American Airlines Arena |
South America
| November 30, 2019 (Note: This concert was part of the Megaland Musicfest 2019.) | Bogota | Colombia | Parque Simon Bolivar |
North America
| December 5, 2019 | San Juan | Puerto Rico | Coliseo de Puerto Rico |
| December 6, 2019 | San Juan | Puerto Rico | Coliseo de Puerto Rico |
| December 7, 2019 | San Juan | Puerto Rico | Coliseo de Puerto Rico |
| December 8, 2019 | San Juan | Puerto Rico | Coliseo de Puerto Rico |
| December 12, 2019 | San Juan | Puerto Rico | Coliseo de Puerto Rico |
| December 13, 2019 | San Juan | Puerto Rico | Coliseo de Puerto Rico |
| December 14, 2019 | San Juan | Puerto Rico | Coliseo de Puerto Rico |
| December 27, 2019 | San Juan | Puerto Rico | Coliseo de Puerto Rico |
| December 28, 2019 | San Juan | Puerto Rico | Coliseo de Puerto Rico |
| December 29, 2019 | San Juan | Puerto Rico | Coliseo de Puerto Rico |

=== Attendance ===
| City | Attendance |
|---|---|
| Santiago de Chile | 32,000 |
| Buenos Aires | 17,000 |
| Corriente | 10,000 |
| Asuncion | 26,000 |
| Madrid | 15,500 |
| London | 15,000+ |
| Paris | 20,000 |
| Tel Aviv | 20,000 |
| Bogota | 19,000 |
| San Juan | 170,000 |
| Total | 344,500 |

=== Box office data ===
| City | Country | Attendance | Box office |
|---|---|---|---|
| Ontario | United States | 7,180 / 8,819 (81%) | $685,200 |
| San Juan | Puerto Rico | 150,888 / 150,888 (100%) | $10,822,173 |
| Total | | 158,068 / 159,707 (99%) | $11,507,373 |
