= King Daddy Tour =

2014–15 concert tour by Daddy Yankee

- Tour by Daddy Yankee
- Location: Europe; North America; South America
- Associated albums: King Daddy; Prestige
- Start date: May 13, 2014
- End date: October 17, 2015
- Legs: 8
- No. of shows: 33 in Europe; 7 in North America; 4 in South America; 44 in total
- Attendance: c. 500,000

Daddy Yankee concert chronology
- Prestige World Tour (2013–2014); King Daddy Tour (2014–2015); The Kingdom Tour (2015–2016)

The King Daddy Tour was the seventh headlining concert tour by Puerto Rican artist Daddy Yankee, launched in support of his seventh studio album Prestige (2012), and his mixtape album King Daddy (2013). The tour started on May 13, 2014, in Scalea, and concluded on October 17, 2015, in Los Angeles.

Daddy Yankee's European tour 2014 was named the 2nd most ticketed following the Rolling Stones' according to reports from the Spanish Association of Music Promoters.

The attendance of the first European leg was nearly 150,000 fans. In Dominican Republic, the attendance was high. Nearly 20,000 tickets were sold at Puerto Plata and more than 50,000 fans packed the Estadio Olimpico Felix Sanchez, during his performance at Festival Presidente 2014.

During the second European leg, the tour was renamed "King Daddy Euro Tour" visiting 19 cities with an attendance of 200,000 fans. During this leg, Daddy Yankee performed for the first time in Israel and the concert was sold out.

At September 19, 2015, he performed at Madison Square Garden, becoming is first show as headliner there since 2007 during the Big Boss Tour. During this concert, his long-time rival Don Omar made a cameo and performed a couple songs. In one part, both made a sort of beef, improvising a cappella, facing for the first time on stage to promote the upcoming tour, the Kingdom Tour, causing a euphoria in the fans and later in the social networks and news around the world. Also, part of the concert (especially during the song "Machucando") was broadcast live in the last show of Sabado Gigante.

== Tour dates ==
Date	City	Country	Venue
Europe
May 23, 2014	Scalea	Italy	People Festival 2014
May 24, 2014	Nantes	France	Zenith Nantes Metropole
May 28, 2014	Villeurbanne	France	Transbordeur
May 29, 2014	Toulouse	France	Zenith Toulouse Metropole
May 30, 2014	Paris	France	Zenith de Paris
May 31, 2014	Paris	France	Zenith de Paris
June 1, 2014	Bordeaux	France	Patinoire Meriadeck
June 4, 2014	Napoles	Italy	Arenile Reload
June 5, 2014	Munich	Germany	Tonhalle München
June 6, 2014	Rome	Italy	Las Fiesta
June 7, 2014	Amsterdam	Netherland	The Sand
June 8, 2014	Malaga	Spain	Auditorio de Malaga
June 13, 2014	Cologne	Germany	Palladium
June 14, 2014	Zurich	Switzerland	Stadhalle
June 19, 2014	Milan	Italy	Festival Latinamericando
June 20, 2014	Bree	Belgium	Festival Afro-Latino 2014
June 21, 2014	Madrid	Spain	Palacio Vistalegre
June 22, 2014	Bilbao	Spain	Auditorio Marina del Sur
South America
June 28, 2014	Lima	Peru	Parque de la Exposicion (Note: The June 28, 2014 concert was part of the concert Barrio Latino, co-headlined by Prince Royce.)
North America
July 18, 2014	Washington D.C	United States	Echostage
July 19, 2014	Houston	United States	Arena Theatre
October 4, 2014 (Note: The October 4, 2014 concert was part of Festival Presidente 2014.)	Santo Domingo	Dominican Republic	Estadio Olimpico Feliz Sanchez
October 18, 2014	Puerto Plata	Dominican Republic	Center Court, Lifestyle Holidays Vacation Resort
November 22, 2014	Inglewood (Note: The November 22, 2014 concert was part of iHeart Radio Fiesta Latina 2014.)	United States	The Forum
February 6, 2015 (Note: The February 6, 2015 concert was part of the All Age Concert.)	New York	United States	Madison Square Garden
April 10, 2015 (Note: The April 10, 2015 concert was part of the Miamibash.)	Miami	United States	American Airlines Arena
South America
June 13, 2015 (Note: The June 13, 2015 concert was part of Urban Kings festival. The concert was part of the inauguration of the Movistar Arena.)	Santiago	Chile	Movistar Arena
Europe
July 8, 2015	Ponferrada	Spain	Auditorio Municipal de Poferrada
July 10, 2015	Bordeaux	France	Patinoire Meriadeck
July 11, 2015	Paris	France	Zenith de Paris
July 12, 2015	Madrid	Spain	Estadio Vicente Calderon
July 13, 2015	Esch Sur Alzette	Luxembourg	Rockhal Main Hall
July 15, 2015	Nice	France	Palais Nikaika
July 17, 2015	Neuchantel	Switzerland	Patinoire du Littoral
July 19, 2015	Vienne	Austria	Theatre Antique
July 22, 2015	Canes	France	Le Colisee
July 23, 2015	Grandia	Spain	Granda Plaza De Toros De Atarfe
July 24, 2015 (Note: The July 24, 2015 concert was part of Honey Latin Festival.)	Granada	Spain	Coliseo Ciudad de Atarfe
July 25, 2015	Malaga	Spain	Auditorio Municipal
July 30, 2015	Bilbao	Spain	Bizkaia Arena
July 31, 2015	Barcelona	Spain	Razzmatazz
~~August 1, 2015~~	~~Almeria~~	Spain	~~Terrenos Beach Festival~~
August 6, 2015	Tel Aviv	Israel	Ganey Hataarukha
August 7, 2015	Alicante	Spain	Alicante Summer Festival
August 8, 2015	Las Palmas de Gran Canaria	Spain	Estadio De Gran Canaria
North America
September 19, 2015	New York	United States	Madison Square Garden
South America
September 24, 2015	Corrientes	Argentina	Anfiteatro Mario del Tránsito Cocomarola
September 26, 2015	Buenos Aires	Argentina	Estadio GEBA
North America
October 17, 2015 (Note: The October 17, 2015 concert was co-headlined by the famous urban artist Yandel.)	Los Angeles	United States	Staples Center

=== Box office data ===
City	Country	Attendance	Box office
New York	United States	15,796 / 15,796 (100%)	$1,212,893
Inglewood	United States	12,479 / 12,729 (98%)	$682,616
New York	United States	13,912 / 15,452 (90%)	$1,017,972
Los Angeles	United States	8,640 / 13,232 (65%)	$504,061
Total		50,827 / 57,209 (89%)	$3,417,542
