= Pasarela (Daddy Yankee song) =

2012 single by Daddy Yankee

Single by Daddy Yankee

from the album Prestige
- Released: July 10, 2012
- Genre: Merengue
- Length: 4:54
- Label: El Cartel, Sony Music
- Songwriter: Raymond Ayala
- Producers: Musicologo & Menes

Daddy Yankee singles chronology
"Lovumba" (2011)	"Pasarela" (2012)	"Limbo" (2012)

"Pasarela" (transl. Catwalk) is the third official single of Daddy Yankee's latest album Prestige. It was released through El Cartel and Sony Music on May 27, 2012 to radios and digitally on July 10, 2012.

== Track listing ==
1. "Pasarela" — 3:55

== Music video ==
The music video of "Pasarela" was released on June 22, 2012 through El Cartel and Sony Music. In the video, Daddy Yankee is shown dating a fashion model. It has more than twenty-one million hits on YouTube.

== Charts ==
=== Weekly charts ===
Chart (2012)	Peak position
Argentina Hot 100 (AV Music)	13
Colombia (National-Report)	12
Honduras (Honduras Top 50)	4
US Hot Latin Songs (Billboard)	4
US Latin Pop Airplay (Billboard)	2
US Tropical Airplay (Billboard)	3
US Latin Rhythm Airplay (Billboard)	1
Venezuela (Record Report)	2

=== Year-end charts ===
Chart (2012)	Position
US Hot Latin Songs (Billboard)	23
