= Prestige (Daddy Yankee album) =

Studio album by Daddy Yankee
- Released: September 11, 2012
- Recorded: 2011–12
- Genres: Reggaeton; hip-hop; Latin pop; electropop
- Length: 60:53
- Labels: El Cartel; Capitol Latin
- Producers: Musicólogo & Menes; MadMusick

Daddy Yankee chronology
Mundial (2010)	Prestige (2012)	King Daddy (2013)

Singles from Prestige
- 1. "Ven Conmigo" Released: April 13, 2011; 2. "Llegamos a la Disco" Released: May 1, 2011; 3. "Lovumba" Released: October 4, 2011; 4. "Pasarela" Released: May 27, 2012; 5. "Limbo" Released: September 7, 2012; 6. "Perros Salvajes" Released: December 6, 2012; 7. "El Amante" Released: April 26, 2013; 8. "La Noche De Los Dos" Released: June 14, 2013; 9. "Switchea" Released: September 11, 2013

Prestige is the sixth studio album and eleventh overall by Puerto Rican rapper Daddy Yankee. It was released through El Cartel Records and Capitol Latin on September 11, 2012. It was produced by Los de la Nazza and Musicólogo & Menes. The album explores music genres as of EDM, dance-pop, Latin pop and electropop and essential reggaeton. According to Yankee himself, "Prestige is best and most complete album". The album met with positive reviews and it receive a nomination for Best Urban Album at the 14th Annual Latin Grammy Awards and for Urban Album of the Year at the Lo Nuestro Awards of 2013.

The album was supported by six singles, the lead, "Ven Conmigo", which won Collaboration of the Year at the Lo Nuestro Awards 2012. This was followed by "Llegamos a la Disco", "Lovumba" which won Urban Song of the Year and "Pasarela". The fifth single "Limbo" was released on September 7, 2012, and topped the US Hot Latin Songs for 15 consecutive weeks, was a massive success Latin America and received moderate airplay in Europe. Eventually, it won Latin Rhythm Song of the Year at the 2014 Latin Billboard Music Awards. The sixth and final, "La Noche de Los Dos", was issued in June 2013.

Prestige debut at the top of Billboard Top Latin Albums, becoming his sixth album to do so. Also made it to the Top 40 in US Billboard 200 and Mexico. In Latin America, charted modelable in Uruguay, Chile, Venezuela and Argentina. It was certified Gold (Latin Field) by RIAA for shipping 50,000 copies in the United States and Platinum in Chile. To promote the album, Yankee embarked in a series on instores copies signing and subsequently on his second European Tour and latter on the Prestige World Tour which include a presentation at 2013 Viña del Mar International Song Festival.

== Background and promotion ==
Initially, Prestige was intended to be a special edition of Yankee's previous record Mundial. It was supposed to be called Daddy Yankee Mundial Prestige, however, due the high expectations, he decided to make a full studio album. The initial release date was supposed to be in July 2011; however, it eventually got pushed back because the producers lost part of the recorded material due a blackout caused by Hurricane Irene in Puerto Rico. In mid-2011, Ven Conmigo was included in the setlist of the last leg of Yankee's Mundial Tour. In January 2012, he released his headphones and Billboard cited that the album was to be released in April of that year.

The album's third single, "Lovumba", was performed at Premios Lo Nuestro 2012 main ceremony. In May 2012, some songs from the album, such as "Lovumba" and "Ven Conmigo", were included on the setlist of Daddy Yankee's European Tour. In July 2012, it was revealed that he had a distribution record deal with Capitol Latin and the album release date was August 28, 2012. However, it ended up finally being released on September 11, 2012.

Yankee's presentation in August 2012 at the Greek Theater in Los Angeles received positive reviews by the critics, who noticed the anticipation of the album by the fans. Shortly before the album was released, Yankee performed at the People en Español Festival on September 1–2 in San Antonio. Following the album release, Yankee embarked in a series of promotional appearances inside retail stores in Orlando, Chicago, San Antonio and Laredo.

== Release ==
The album was released on September 11, 2012, through El Cartel Records and Capitol Latin. In an interview in Miami Daddy Yankee said: "My fans are the best. Prestige is a production for everyone to access what is good, what is great and prestigious in music." The album was nominated at the Latin GRAMMYS for best urban music album. Songwriters and engineers include Eliezer Palacios, Giancarlo Rivera, Tom Coyne, Mike Couzzi, Jose Ramon Florez, Oscar Vinader, Jonathan Rivera & Francisco Saldaña.

== Critical reception ==
Professional ratings
Review scores
Source	Rating
AllMusic	4/5 stars
San Antonio Current	3/5 stars

AllMusic gave the album a positive review and said the "Prestige would be cumbersome at 17 tracks if an overflow of flash, swagger, and talent didn't make that number right-sized". Also, defined the single Ven Conmigo as a "Another career high point for the one they rightfully call "The Big Boss."

== Commercial performance ==
=== Album ===
In the United States, The album debuted at number 39 on the US Billboard 200 and at number one on the Billboard Top Latin Albums chart, selling 8,511 copies in its first week. It also debut at number one of Billboard Latin Rhythm Albums at stayed there for two consecutive weeks. As of November 2013, it sold over 43,000 copies in the United States which 38% consisted in digital download. On March 8, 2013, the album received a Latin album gold certification by the Recording Industry Association of America (RIAA) for shipping 50,000 copies.

The album was a commercial success in Chile to and was certified gold. Also, it peaked at number 93 at Swiss album chart and charted inside of Uruguay which peaked at number 12 and Mexican Albums charts at 44. In Venezuela, Presitge was peaked at 11 at the charts of the retail store Recordland. In Chile, it was the 19th best selling album of the month of April 2013. In Argentina, Prestige debut at number 7 at the monthly album chart.

=== Singles ===
"Ven Conmigo" was released as the first official single on April 13, 2011, to radios and digitally on April 19, 2011. It features Bachata artist Prince Royce. It was produced by Musicólogo & Menes It peaked at No. 9 on the Billboard Latin Songs chart. It also peaked at No. 2 on both the Billboard Latin Tropical Airplay chart and the Billboard Latin Rhythm Airplay. Also, the track charted in the Top 20 of Mexico, Peru and Venezuela Airplay. The music video for "Ven Conmigo" was released on June 3, 2011. As of May 9, 2012 the song had more than 142 million views on YouTube.

"Lovumba" was released as the second official single digitally on October 4, 2011. The song is a fusion of mambo, soca and dance beats. The name "Lovumba" is a blend of the words Love and Rumba. The song was also produced by Musicologo & Menes. The music video for "Lovumba" was recorded in Puerto Rico in December 2011 and was directed by Carlos "Bambam" Martin and was released on January 11, 2012. It peaked at No. 1 on both the Billboard Latin Songs and the Billboard Latin Pop Songs. The single charted moderately in Belgium, Denmark, France and Switzerland. It also reached the Top 10 in Peru and Spain Airplay and Download. The track was certified Gold for selling 25,000 in Italy,

"Pasarela" was released as the third official single on May 21, 2012. The music video was released on June 22, 2012. The track peaked at number 4 on US Billboard Hot Latin Songs and at the top 10 of Colombia, Honduras and Venezuela Airplay.

"Limbo" is the fourth official single from the album. and was the most successful single of the album and Yankee's music career. It was produced by MadMusick. It peaked at No. 1 on both the Billboard Latin Songs and the Billboard Latin Pop Songs for 15 consecutive weeks. The official remix features Puerto Rican reggaeton duo Wisin & Yandel. The hit also was performed by Daddy Yankee at the opening of the 2013 Latin Billboard Awards. The track top the airplay charts in Chile and Venezuela and reached the Top 5 in Peru and Argentina. It also chart moderably in France, Italy, Mexico and Switzerland. Subsequently, the track was certified gold and platinum in Chile, Italy and Spain and was included on the video game Just Dance 2014. The music video was released on October 27, 2012, and as of May 2022 it has more than 1 Billion of views on YouTube. Also, the track was nominated for Best Urban Song at the 14th Annual Latin Grammy Awards.

== Track listing ==
All lyrics are written by Daddy Yankee (co-writing in collaboration songs); all music is composed by Los de la Nazza (except on track 7 and 10).

Standard Edition
No.	Title	Writer(s)	Music	Length
1.	"Perros Salvajes"	Ramón Luis Ayala Rodríguez	Los de la Nazza	3:10
2.	"Miss Show"	Ayala	Los de la Nazza	2:48
3.	"Pon T Loca"	Ayala	Los de la Nazza	2:59
4.	"El Amante" (Featuring J Alvarez)	Ayala, Javid David Álvarez Fernández	Los de la Nazza	3:40
5.	"Pasarela"	Ayala	Los de la Nazza	3:13
6.	"Po' Encima"	Ayala	Los de la Nazza	2:32
7.	"La Noche De Los Dos" (Featuring Natalia Jiménez)	Ayala, Antonio Rayo Gibo	Rayito	3:44
8.	"Llegamos a la Disco" (Featuring De La Ghetto, Ñengo Flow, Arcángel, Farruko, Baby Rasta & Gringo, Alex Kyza & Kendo Kaponi)	Ayala, Rafael Castillo, Edwin Rosa, Austin Santos, Wilmer Alicea, Samuel Gerena, Alex Kyza, José Rivera Morales	Los de la Nazza	7:33
9.	"Switchea"	Ayala	Los de la Nazza	3:05
10.	"Limbo"	Ayala, Eliezer Palacios, Giancarlos Rivera, Jonathan Rivera, Francisco Saldaña	MadMusick	3:44
11.	"La Calle Moderna"	Ayala	Los de la Nazza	3:32
12.	"After Party" (Featuring De La Ghetto)	Ayala, Castillo	Los de la Nazza	3:45
13.	"La Maquina De Baile"	Ayala	Los de la Nazza	2:43
14.	"Más Que Un Amigo" (Featuring Farruko)	Ayala, Carlos Efrén Reyes Rosado	Los de la Nazza	4:05
15.	"Baby" (Featuring Randy)	Ayala, Randy Ariel Ortiz Acevedo	Los de la Nazza	3:03
16.	"Lovumba"	Ayala	Los de la Nazza, Raffy Lind	3:38
17.	"Ven Conmigo" (Featuring Prince Royce)	Ayala, Geoffrey Royce Rojas	Los de la Nazza, Melvin Garica	3:39

iTunes Bonus Tracks
No.	Title	Writer(s)	Producer(s)	Length
18.	"Lose Control" (featuring Emelee)	Ayala, Emelee	Eric Velez	3:34
19.	"6 De Enero"	Ayala	Los de la Nazza	3:22

Amazon / Spotify Bonus Tracks
No.	Title	Writer(s)	Producer(s)	Length
18.	"El Party Me Llama (Featuring Nicky Jam)"	Ayala, Nick Rivera Caminero	Los de la Nazza	3:15

Walmart Bonus Tracks
No.	Title	Writer(s)	Producer(s)	Length
18.	"Suelta El Arsenal" (featuring Jory)	Ayala, Fernando Sierra	Los de la Nazza	3:04

Physical CD Bonus Tracks
No.	Title	Writer(s)	Producer(s)	Length
18.	"Llevo Tras De Ti" (featuring Plan B)	Ayala, Orlando Javier Valle Vega, Edwin Vázquez Vega	Los de la Nazza	4:05
19.	"BPM"	Ayala	Los de la Nazza	3:35

== Charts ==
=== Weekly charts ===
Chart (2012)	Peak position
Argentine Albums (CAPIF)	7
Chilean Albums (Prensario)	19
Mexican Albums (AMPROFON)	44
Swiss Albums (Schweizer Hitparade)	93
US Billboard 200	39
US Top Rap Albums (Billboard)	5
US Top Latin Albums (Billboard)	1
US Latin Rhythm Albums (Billboard)	1
Uruguayan Albums (CUD)	12

Chart (2013)	Peak position
US Latin Albums (Billboard)	16

Chart (2017)	Peak position
US Latin Albums (Billboard)	49

== Sales and certifications ==
Region	Certification	Certified units/sales
Chile	Platinum	
Italy (FIMI)	Gold	25,000^{‡}
United States (RIAA)	2× Platinum (Latin)	120,000^{‡}
^{‡} Sales+streaming figures based on certification alone.

== Accolades ==
Year	Ceremony	Award	Result
2013	Latin Billboard Music Awards	Latin Rhythm Album of the Year	Nominated
2013	Latin Grammy Awards	Best Urban Music Album	Nominated
2013	Lo Nuestro Awards	Urban Album of the Year	Nominated
2013	Los Premios 40 Principales América	Best Album	Nominated
2013	Premios Juventud	Just Play It All	Nominated
