= European Tour (Daddy Yankee) =

2012 concert tour by Daddy Yankee

- Continental tour by Daddy Yankee
- Location: Europe
- Associated album: Mundial
- Start date: May 1, 2012
- End date: May 16, 2012
- Legs: 1
- No. of shows: 10
- Attendance: 300,000

Daddy Yankee concert chronology
- Mundial Tour (2010–2011); European Tour (2012); Prestige World Tour (2013–2014)

The European Tour was a concert tour by the reggaeton performer Daddy Yankee to promote his album Mundial. The tour visited 10 cities in 9 countries. The tour started on May 1, 2012, in Napoli, Italy and ended in Stockholm, Sweden. This tour marked the second time that he toured as a headliner in Europe.

The tour had a total attendance of 300,000 fans and the set list included some songs of his following studio album, Prestige.

== Tour dates ==
Date	City	Country	Venue
May 1, 2012	Napoli	Italy	Palapartenope Di Napoli
May 2, 2012	Frankfurt	Germany	Latin Palace Chango
May 3, 2012	Zürich	Switzerland	Standthalle
May 4, 2012	Barcelona	Spain	Palau Olimpic de Badalona
May 5, 2012	Palma De Mallorca	Spain	Palma Arena
May 7, 2012	Paris	France	Zenith de Paris
May 11, 2012	Antwerp	Belgium	Noxx Antwerpen Main Room
May 12, 2012	Amsterdam	Netherlands	The Sand
May 15, 2012	Oslo	Norway	Vikaterrassen
May 16, 2012	Stockholm	Sweden	Church Rörstrandsgatan
