= La Gira Dura =

2018 concert tour by Daddy Yankee

- Tour by Daddy Yankee
- Location: North America; Europe; Asia; South America
- Start date: March 8, 2018
- End date: December 8, 2018
- Legs: 3
- No. of shows: 10 in Europe; 3 in North America; 3 in South America; 1 in Asia; 17 in total

Daddy Yankee concert chronology
- TamoEnVivoTour (2017); La Gira Dura (2018); Con Calma Tour (2019)

La Gira Dura was the ninth headlining concert tour by Puerto Rican artist Daddy Yankee. The tour name references his 2018 hit "Dura". It began on March 8, 2018 in Tucumán at Estadio Central Córdoba, and concluded on December 8, of the same year, in Mexico City at Foro Sol Stadium.

During this tour, he performed in London at the SSE Arena. It was his first concert in the United Kingdom. Also, the tour had his first concerts in Albania and in China, becoming the first reggaeton artist ever to perform in those countries. In Argentina, the media reported that the attendance of both concerts was about 40,000 fans.

== Set list ==
1. Todo Comienza En La Disco
2. Vuelve
3. Sola RMX (With Anuel AA)
4. Shaky Shaky
5. Dura
6. Havana
7. El Desorden
8. Hasta El Amanecer RMX
9. La Rompe Carros
10. La Despedida

== Tour dates ==
| Date | City | Country | Venue |
South America
| March 8, 2018 (Note: This concert was co-headlined by Ozuna.) | Tucuman | Argentina | Estadio Central Córdoba |
| March 11, 2018 | Buenos Aires | Argentina | Estadio GEBA |
| July 1, 2018 | Neiva | Colombia | Club Los Lagos Comfamiliar |
Europe
| July 25, 2018 | Ibiza | Spain | Amnesia |
| July 26, 2018 | Rome | Italy | Fiesta |
| July 27, 2018 | Tirana | Albania | Skanderbeg Square |
| July 28, 2018 (Note: This concert was part of Reggaeton Beach Festival 2018.) | Barcelona | Spain | Playa del Port Fòrum |
| July 31, 2018 (Note: This concert was co-headlined by Bad Bunny.) | Zurich | Switzerland | Samsung Hall |
| August 3, 2018 | Amsterdam | Netherlands | The Box |
| August 5, 2018 (Note: This concert was part of the Latin Fest.) | Valencia | Spain | Escena Gandia |
| August 9, 2018 | Martigues | France | Esplanade Exterieur De La Halle De Martigues |
| August 10, 2018 | London | United Kingdom | SSE Arena |
| August 14, 2018 (Note: This concert was part of the Puro Latino Fest 2018.) | Santa Maria | Spain | Escenario Puerto Sherry |
Asia
| September 15, 2018 (Note: This concert was part of the Concrete & Grass Festival 2018.) | Shanghai | China | Shanghai Rugby Club |
North America
| December 3, 2018 (Note: This concert was co-headlined by Bad Bunny) | La Romana | Dominican Republic | Altos de Chavon |
| December 7, 2018 (Note: This concert was part of the Coca-Cola Flow Fest 2018) | Monterrey | Mexico | Auditorio citiBanamex |
| December 8, 2018 (Note: This Concert was part of the Flow Fest 2018) | Mexico City | Mexico | Foro Sol |
