= Prestige World Tour =

2013–14 concert tour by Daddy Yankee

- Tour by Daddy Yankee
- Promotional poster for the tour
- Location: South America; North America; Europe
- Associated album: Prestige
- Start date: February 23, 2013
- End date: April 15, 2014
- Legs: 3
- No. of shows: 5 in North America; 7 in South America; 12 in Europe; 24 in total
- Attendance: 150,000+

Daddy Yankee concert chronology
- European Tour (2012); Prestige World Tour (2013–2014); King Daddy Tour (2014–2015)

The Prestige World Tour was the sixth headlining concert tour by the Puero Rican artist Daddy Yankee, launched in support of his seventh studio album Prestige (2012). The majority of the venues in United States (unlike the previous tour) were nightclubs because it was easier for him to promote his liquor "Cartel Tequila". However, in Europe he performed at bigger venues and arenas. The tour marked his third consecutive visit to Europe as a headliner.

The show at Movistar Arena in Chile had attendance of 12,000 fans according to local media. The concert at the Festival Viva Ventanilla reported an attendance of more than 20,000. Also, his presentation in Conquimbo, Chile at the Pampilla de Coquimbo Music Festival had a total attendance of 150,000 according to local media. While in Spain, the concert co-headlined by Prince Royce was reported sold out. In the same way, the concert in Quito, Ecuador had more than 28,000 tickets sold. The European leg had a total attendance of over 100,000 fans.

== Set list ==
1. Perros Salvajes
2. Ven Conmigo
3. Guaya (With Arcángel)
4. Llegamos A La Disco (With Arcángel)
5. Gasolina
6. Miss Show
7. Pon T Loca
8. El Amante (With J Álvarez)
9. La Pregunta (With J Álvarez, Tito El Bambino)
10. La Noche De Los Dos
11. After Party
12. Baby (With Randy)
13. Salgo Pa La Calle (With Randy)
14. Lovumba
15. Limbo
16. Más Que Un Amigo (With Farruko)
17. Nene Fichu (With Farruko)
18. Pa Romper La Discoteca (With Farruko, Yomo)
19. Aprovecha (With Nova & Jory)
20. Pata Boom (With Nova & Jory)
21. Switchea
22. Pasarela

== Tour dates ==
Date	City	Country	Venue
South America
February 25, 2013 (Note: This concert was part of 2013 Viña del Mar International Song Festival)	Viña del Mar	Chile	Quinta Vergara
North America
March 30, 2013 (Note: This concert was part of Brava Reventon Music Festival)	Puerto San Jose	Guatemala	San Jose Beach
May 8, 2013	Houston	United States	Arena Theatre
May 17, 2013	Los Angeles	United States	La Boom
May 24, 2013	St Petersburg	United States	Jannus Live
Europe
June 15, 2013	Gran Canaria	Spain	Estadio Municipal de El Hornillo
June 16, 2013 (Note: This concert was coheadlined with Prince Royce)	Madrid	Spain	Palacio Vistalegre
June 20, 2013	Brussels	Belgium	Forest National
June 21, 2013	Amsterdam	Netherlands	The Sand
June 22, 2013 (Note: This concert was co-headlined by Prince Royce)	Lausanne	Switzerland	Patinoire de Malley
June 23, 2013	Paris	France	Zenith de Paris
June 25, 2013	Paris	France	Zenith de Paris
June 26, 2013	Lyon	France	Le Bloc Club
June 27, 2013 (Note: This concert was part of the Festival Latinoamericano 2013)	Milan	Italy	Mediolanum Forum
June 29, 2013	Nice	France	Palais Nikaia
June 30, 2013	Barcelona	Spain	La Farga L'Hospitalet
South America
July 15, 2013	Santiago	Chile	Movistar Arena
Europe
August 10, 2013	Hamburg	Germany	Große Freiheit 36
South America
August 17, 2013 (Note: This concert was part of the City`s 473rd Anniversary Festival)	Arequipa	Peru	Jardin de la Cerveza
September 20, 2013 (Note: This performance was part of the Pampilla de Conquillo Music Festival 2013)	Coquimbo	Chile	Escenario Monumental
September 30, 2013 (Note: This concert was part of the Festival Viva Ventanilla 2013)	Lima	Peru	Complejo Deportivo Antonia Moreno De Cáceres
April 10, 2014	Guayaquil	Ecuador	Estadio Modelo Alberto Spencer
April 12, 2014	Quito	Ecuador	Parque Bicentenario
North America
April 15, 2014	Mexico City	Mexico	Estadio Azteca
