= Lovumba =

2011 single by Daddy Yankee

Single by Daddy Yankee

from the album Prestige
- Released: October 4, 2011 (Digital)
- Genre: Soca; calypso; mambo
- Length: 3:38
- Label: El Cartel, Sony Music Latin
- Songwriter: Raymond Ayala
- Producers: Musicologo & Menes

Daddy Yankee singles chronology
"Llegamos a la Disco" (2011)	"Lovumba" (2011)	"Pasarela" (2012)

"Lovumba" is the second official single by Puerto Rican reggaeton singer Daddy Yankee from his seventh studio album, Prestige (2012). The single was released digitally on October 4, 2011. The song is a fusion of mambo, soca and dance beats. The name "Lovumba" is a blend of the words Love and Rumba. The song was produced by Musicologo and Menes (Los de La Nazza). A Remix version that featured Daddy Yankee and Don Omar was released on January 7, 2012. Both the single and remix versions are included on Daddy Yankee's album Prestige. The song was nominated for the Latin Grammy Award for Best Urban Song.

== Track listing ==
iTunes digital download

1. "Lovumba (Prestige)" — 3:38
2. "Lovumba (Remix)" (featuring Don Omar) - 3:32
3. "Lovumba (Club Remix)" - 3:50

== Music video ==
The music video for Lovumba was recorded in Puerto Rico in December 2011 and was directed by Carlos "Bambam" Martin. The video was released on January 11, 2012.

== Charts ==
=== Weekly charts ===
Chart (2012)	Peak position
Belgium (Ultratip Bubbling Under Wallonia)	31
Colombia (National-Report)	3
Denmark (Tracklisten)	55
France (SNEP)	135
Spain (Promusicae)	33
Spain Digital Song Sales (Billboard)	4
Mexican Pop Airplay (Billboard)	49
Switzerland (Schweizer Hitparade)	56
Peru Airplay (UNIMPRO)	6
US Bubbling Under Hot 100 (Billboard)	23
US Latin Rhythm Airplay (Billboard)	1
US Hot Latin Songs (Billboard)	1
US Latin Pop Airplay (Billboard)	1
US Tropical Airplay (Billboard)	2
Venezuela Top Latino (Record Report)	9

=== Year-end charts ===
Chart (2012)	Position
US Hot Latin Songs (Billboard)	7

== Certifications ==
Region	Certification	Certified units/sales
Italy (FIMI)	Gold	25,000^{‡}
Spain (Promusicae)	Platinum	60,000^{‡}
^{‡} Sales+streaming figures based on certification alone.

== See also ==
- List of Billboard number-one Latin songs of 2012
