= The Kingdom Tour =

2015–16 concert tour by Daddy Yankee and Don Omar

- National tour by Daddy Yankee and Don Omar
- Location: North America
- Start date: December 3, 2015
- End date: August 27, 2016
- Legs: 2
- No. of shows: 9
- Attendance: c. 100,000
- Box office: US $6,343,617
Daddy Yankee tour chronology
King Daddy Tour (2014–2015)	The Kingdom Tour (2015–2016)	TamoEnVivoTour (2017)
Don Omar tour chronology
Hecho En Puerto Rico (2013)	The Kingdom Tour (2015–2016)	Back to Reggaeton Tour (2024)

The Kingdom Tour was a co-headlining concert tour by reggaeton superstars Daddy Yankee and Don Omar.

Main plans of this tour was "a 60-date Yankee/Omar tour" that was scheduled to run for two years. Also, this partnership included a joint album and a TV show for the two artists. However, for unknown reasons only nine concerts were performed.

In a 2022 interview with El Chombo, Don Omar shared his version of the events that led to the abrupt end of the project. According to him, the original idea was a solo farewell concert titled Don Omar vs. Don Omar, which he pitched to music executive Raphy Pina. Pina suggested turning the event into a collaborative effort by inviting Daddy Yankee to join, transforming it into a co-headlining tour. Although hesitant at first, Don Omar agreed, motivated by the potential of delivering something historic for reggaeton fans.

Don Omar claimed to have taken a leading role in the creative direction of the tour. He oversaw elements such as the stage design, choreography, musical arrangements, and transitions, while Daddy Yankee was touring in Europe. However, tensions reportedly flared once Yankee returned and dismissed much of the work that had been done in his absence. Don Omar viewed this as a sign of disrespect and evidence of deeper incompatibilities, noting that he and Daddy Yankee had never been friends and had a long-standing rivalry.

Several other disagreements emerged behind the scenes. One involved the unauthorized use of Don Omar’s track “Cara a Cara” in promotional materials. Another stemmed from logistics: each artist had a 50-person team traveling with them, but when promoters asked both to reduce their teams to 25 to cut costs, Don Omar agreed while Daddy Yankee reportedly refused.

The situation worsened after their first performance in Puerto Rico. A local newspaper published a front-page headline reading “Daddy Yankee knocks out Don Omar,” framing the concert as a competition rather than a collaboration. Don Omar said he believed Yankee’s team paid for the headline and saw it as a betrayal. That same night, he told Raphy Pina and the tour organizers that he would not continue.

According to Don Omar, a final incident occurred during a concert in Las Vegas. Moments before his set, his team allegedly discovered that their audio cables had been unplugged. The delay forced Don Omar to wait 20 minutes before performing, which he believed was intentional sabotage. He left the venue immediately after his performance and later sent an email to Pina, formally withdrawing from the tour.

After these events, promoters concluded that the project could not continue. Don Omar claimed that he faced legal threats for walking away, but argued that no formal contract had ever been signed. He also alleged that Daddy Yankee’s team falsely claimed the existence of a signed agreement and used social media to attack his credibility. Don Omar said he chose not to respond publicly at the time, deciding instead to walk away quietly.

== Commercial performance ==
The first two shows in the Coliseo de Puerto Rico were sold out in record time. Due to high demand two more shows were added.

== Tour dates ==
Date	City	Country	Venue
Leg 1
December 3, 2015	San Juan	Puerto Rico	Coliseo Jose Miguel Agrelot
December 4, 2015	San Juan	Puerto Rico	Coliseo Jose Miguel Agrelot
December 5, 2015	San Juan	Puerto Rico	Coliseo Jose Miguel Agrelot
December 6, 2015	San Juan	Puerto Rico	Coliseo Jose Miguel Agrelot
Leg 2
May 6, 2016	Las Vegas	United States	MGM Grand Garden Arena
July 30, 2016	New York	United States	Madison Square Garden
August 6, 2016	Miami	United States	American Airlines Arena
August 7, 2016	Orlando	United States	Amway Center
August 27, 2016	Los Angeles	United States	Staples Center

=== Box office data ===
City	Country	Attendance	Box office
San Juan	Puerto Rico	45,752 / 50,947 (90%)	$3,165,545
Las Vegas	United States	7,515 / 8,005 (94%)	$489,247
Los Angeles	United States	15,578 / 15,578 (100%)	$1,185,029
Orlando	United States	6,305 / 12,382 (51%)	$510,787
New York	United States	12,782 / 15,133 (85%)	$993,009
Total		87,932 / 102,045 (86%)	$6,343,617
