= Mundial Tour =

2010–11 concert tour by Daddy Yankee

- Tour by Daddy Yankee
- Location: North America • South America • Europe
- Associated album: Mundial
- Start date: April 3, 2010
- End date: August 26, 2011
- Legs: 3
- No. of shows: 18 in North America; 14 in South America; 4 in Europe; 39 total

Daddy Yankee concert chronology
- Talento de Barrio Tour (2009); Mundial Tour (2010–11); European Tour (2012)

The Mundial Tour was a concert tour by the reggaeton performer Daddy Yankee in support of his sixth studio album, Mundial (2010). The tour visited the United States, South and Central America and Europe.

== Set list ==
1. Grito Mundial
2. La Despedida
3. Me Enteré (With Tito El Bambino)
4. Mia (With Tito El Bambino)
5. Pata Boom
6. Daría
7. Rumba Y Candela
8. La Señal
9. El Ritmo No Perdona
10. Rescate (With Alexis & Fido)
11. Impacto (With Alexis & Fido)
12. Yo Voy
13. El Más Duro
14. Descontrol
15. El Mejor De Todos Los Tiempos

== Tour dates ==
Date	City	Country	Venue
Leg 1 – The Americas
June 12, 2010 (Note: This concert was part of the Tampa Bay Caribbean Carnival 2010)	Tampa	United States	Vinoy Park
June 22, 2010 (Note: This concert was part of Summer Zol 2010 Festival)	Gaithersburg	United States	Montgomery County Fairground
July 17, 2010 (Note: This concert was part of Reventon Superestrella 2010)	Los Angeles	United States	Staples Center
July 18, 2010 (Note: This concert was part of the Festival Colombiano 2010)	Miami	United States	Tamiami Park
July 25, 2010 (Note: This concert was part of Guaya Guaya Fest 2010)	Boqueron	Puerto Rico	TBA
July 31, 2010	Bogota	Colombia	Coliseo El Chaplin
August 14, 2010	Orlando	United States	House of Blues
August 20, 2010	Denver	United States	Denver Coliseum
August 21, 2010 (Note: This concert was part of Mega Festival 2010)	Chicago	United States	All State Arena
August 26, 2010	Antofagasta	Chile	Estadio Regional de Antofagasta
August 27, 2010	Tacna	Peru	Escenario Parque Peru
August 28, 2010	Iquique	Chile	Tierra de Campeones
August 29, 2010	Santiago	Chile	Velodromo Estadio Nacional
August 30, 2010	Puerto Montt	Chile	Arena Puerto Montt
August 31, 2010	Osorno	Chile	Escenario Gimnasio Maria Gallardo
September 1, 2010	Temuco	Chile	Estadio German Becker
September 3, 2010	Concepcion	Chile	Estadio el Collado
September 21, 2010 (Note: This concert was part of Vive Tu Musica Festival 2010)	Hollywood	United States	Hollywood Palladium
September 24, 2010	Laredo	United States	Laredo Energy Arena
September 25, 2010	Corpus Christi	United States	American Bank Center
September 26, 2010	McAllen	United States	Convention Center
Leg 2 – Europe
October 2, 2010	Geneva	Switzerland	Arena de Geneve
October 3, 2010	Paris	France	Zenith de Paris
October 7, 2010	London	England	O2 Academy Brixton
October 8, 2010	Antwerp	Belgium	Lotto Arena
Leg 3 – Americas
January 23, 2011	Los Angeles	United States	Calibash
April 1, 2011	San Pedro Zula	Honduras	Estadio Francisco Morazán
April 2, 2011	Tegucigalpa	Honduras	Estadio Chochi Sosa
April 13, 2011	New York	United States	Madison Square Garden
May 13, 2011	Santiago	Chile	Movistar Arena
May 21, 2011	Santiago de los Caballeros	Dominican Republic	Gran Arena del Cibao
May 23, 2011	Tortola	British Virgin Islands	Tortola Bay
July 23, 2011	Brampton	Canada	Powerade Centre
July 30, 2011	Panama City	Panama	Figali Convention Center
August 6. 2011 (Note: This concert was part of Summer Festival)	Bogota	Colombia	Parque Simon Bolivar
August 20, 2011	Calgary	Canada	Stampede Corral
August 26, 2011	Edmonton	Canada	Edmonton Events Center
August 27, 2011	Montreal	Canada	Uniprix Stadium
September 16, 2011	Trujillo	Peru	Real Plaza
September 17, 2011 (Note: This is concert was part of the Lima Fest)	Lima	Peru	Estadio Monumental
December 3, 2011 (Note: Festival Aragua 2011)	Marcay	Venezuela	Estadio Olimpico Maracay

=== Cancelled shows ===
Date	City	Country	Reason
August 19, 2010	Chicago	United States	Breach of contract
November 5, 2010	Mendoza	Argentina	Breach of contract
November 7, 2010	Neuquen	Argentina	Breach of contract
November 11, 2010	San Juan	Argentina	Breach of contract
November 12, 2010	Cordoba	Argentina	Breach of contract
December 4, 2010	Buenos Aires	Argentina	Breach of contract
November 14, 2010	Comodoro Rivadavia	Argentina	Breach of contract
November 17, 2010	Bahia Blanca	Argentina	Breach of contract
November 19, 2010	Rosario	Argentina	Breach of contract
November 20, 2010	Tucuman	Argentina	Breach of contract
November 21, 2010	Salta	Argentina	Breach of contract
