= List of awards and nominations received by Daddy Yankee =

Daddy Yankee awards and nominations
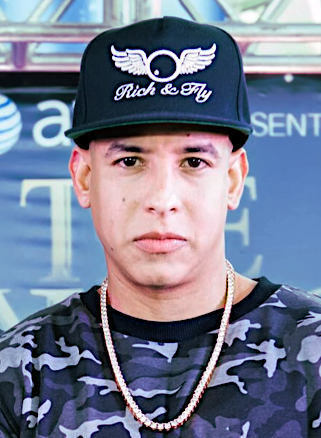
- Daddy Yankee promoting his co-headlining tour The Kingdom in 2015
Awards and nominations
Award	Wins	Nominations
American Music Awards	3	9
Billboard Music Awards	8	16
Billboard Latin Music Awards	30	82
Grammy Awards	0	5
iHeartRadio Music Awards	3	15
Latin American Music Awards	4	34
Latin Grammy Awards	7	30

Totals (Note: Certain award groups do not simply award one winner. They acknowledge several different recipients, have runners-up, and have third place. Since this is a specific recognition and is different from losing an award, runner-up mentions are considered wins in this award tally. For simplification and to avoid errors, each award in this list has been presumed to have had a prior nomination.)
- Wins: 160
- Nominations: 530

Puerto Rican rapper Daddy Yankee has won 160 awards from 530 nominations. He has been nominated for 80 Billboard Latin Music Awards, 28 Latin Grammy Awards, 25 Latin American Music Awards, 16 Billboard Music Awards, 9 American Music Awards, and 5 Grammy Awards. He has received 30 Billboard Latin Music Awards, 8 Billboard Music Awards, the most by any Latin artist, 7 Latin Grammy Awards, 4 Latin American Music Awards, and 3 American Music Awards. He was recognized with the Latin Songwriter of the Year award from the American Society of Composers, Authors and Publishers four times and became the first urban artist to receive his own star at the Puerto Rican Walk of Fame sidewalk and to be inducted into the Billboard Latin Music Hall of Fame. His career was also recognized with the Lo Nuestro Lifetime Achievement Award and other honours given by the Hispanic Heritage Foundation and the World Boxing Council.

Daddy Yankee rose to prominence with the release of his third studio album, Barrio Fino (2004), which garnered him a Latin Grammy Award for Best Urban Music Album. The lead single, "Gasolina", became the first reggaeton song to receive a nomination for a Latin Grammy Award for Record of the Year. Following the success of Barrio Fino, Daddy Yankee released the studio albums El Cartel: The Big Boss (2007), Mundial (2010), and Prestige (2012), the live album Barrio Fino en Directo (2005), the soundtrack Talento de Barrio (2008), and the mixtape King Daddy (2013). All of these were nominated for Latin Grammy Awards for Best Urban Music Album, while El Cartel: The Big Boss received a Grammy Award nomination. During this time, his singles "Impacto" (2007), "Llamado de Emergencia" (2008), "Grito Mundial" (2009), "Descontrol" (2010), "Ven Conmigo", "Lovumba" (both 2011), and "Limbo" (2012), as well as his guest feature on Miguelito's "Al Son del Boom" (2007), were nominated for Latin Grammy Awards for Best Urban Song.

His guest feature on Luis Fonsi's "Despacito" (2017) garnered him four Latin Grammy Awards, including Record and Song of the Year, as well as three Grammy Award nominations, also including Record and Song of the Year. It also received five Billboard Music Awards, including Top Hot 100 Song, and six Billboard Latin Music Awards. Between 2015 and 2020, "Sígueme y Te Sigo" (2015), "Yo Contra Ti" (2017), "Dura" (2018), and "Con Calma" (2019), as well as his guest features on Cosculluela's "A Donde Voy" (2016) and Anuel AA's "China" (2019), were nominated for Latin Grammy Awards, with "Dura" garnering his first and only win for Best Urban Song. He also won a Billboard Music Award for Top Latin Song for "Con Calma". His final album, Legendaddy (2022), was nominated for a Grammy Award for Best Música Urbana Album, while its single "Agua" garnered him his second Latin Grammy Award for Song of the Year nomination. He will retire from music in 2023 after the end of his farewell concert tour.

Name of the award ceremony, year presented, recipient of the award, category and resultDaddy Yankee's awards and nominations
Organization	Year	Nominated work	Category	Result	Ref.
American Latino Media Arts Awards	2006	Daddy Yankee	Outstanding Male Musical Performer	Won	
American Music Awards	2005	Daddy Yankee	Favorite Latin Artist	Nominated	
American Music Awards	2006	Daddy Yankee	Favorite Latin Artist	Nominated	
American Music Awards	2007	Daddy Yankee	Favorite Latin Artist	Nominated	
American Music Awards	2010	Daddy Yankee	Favorite Latin Artist	Nominated	
American Music Awards	2017	Daddy Yankee	Favorite Latin Artist	Nominated	
American Music Awards	2017	"Despacito"	Collaboration of the Year	Won	
American Music Awards	2017	"Despacito"	Favorite Pop/Rock Song	Won	
American Music Awards	2017	"Despacito"	Video of the Year	Nominated	
American Music Awards	2018	Daddy Yankee	Favorite Latin Artist	Won	
ASCAP Latin Awards	2006	Daddy Yankee	Latin Songwriter of the Year	Won	
ASCAP Latin Awards	2006	"Lo Que Pasó, Pasó"	Latin Song of the Year	Won	
ASCAP Latin Awards	2006	"Mayor Que Yo"	Latin Urban Song of the Year	Won	
ASCAP Latin Awards	2014	Daddy Yankee	Voice of Music Award	Won	
ASCAP Latin Awards	2014	"Limbo"	Latin Song of the Year	Won	
ASCAP Latin Awards	2017	Daddy Yankee	Latin Songwriter/Artist of the Year	Won	
ASCAP Latin Awards	2018	"Despacito"	Latin Song of the Year	Won	
ASCAP Latin Awards	2019	Daddy Yankee	Latin Songwriter/Artist of the Year	Won	
ASCAP Latin Awards	2020	"Con Calma"	Latin Song of the Year	Won	
ASCAP Latin Awards	2021	Daddy Yankee	Latin Songwriter of the Year	Won	
Billboard Music Awards	2005	Daddy Yankee	Latin Albums Artist of the Year	Won	
Billboard Music Awards	2005	Barrio Fino	Latin Album of the Year	Won	
Billboard Music Awards	2005	"Lo Que Pasó, Pasó"	Top Latin Song	Nominated	
Billboard Music Awards	2014	"Limbo"	Top Latin Song	Nominated	
Billboard Music Awards	2017	"Shaky Shaky"	Top Latin Song	Nominated	
Billboard Music Awards	2018	Daddy Yankee	Top Latin Artist	Nominated	
Billboard Music Awards	2018	"Despacito"	Top Hot 100 Song	Won	
Billboard Music Awards	2018	"Despacito"	Top Streaming Song (Audio)	Nominated	
Billboard Music Awards	2018	"Despacito"	Top Streaming Song (Video)	Won	
Billboard Music Awards	2018	"Despacito"	Top Selling Song	Won	
Billboard Music Awards	2018	"Despacito"	Top Collaboration	Won	
Billboard Music Awards	2018	"Despacito"	Top Latin Song	Won	
Billboard Music Awards	2019	"Dura"	Top Latin Song	Nominated	
Billboard Music Awards	2020	"Con Calma"	Top Latin Song	Won	
Billboard Music Awards	2020	"China"	Top Latin Song	Nominated	
Billboard Music Awards	2023	Daddy Yankee	Top Latin Touring Artist	Nominated	
Billboard Latin Music Awards	2005	Barrio Fino	Reggaeton Album of the Year	Won	
Billboard Latin Music Awards	2006	Daddy Yankee	Hot Latin Songs Artist of the Year	Nominated	
Billboard Latin Music Awards	2006	Daddy Yankee	Top Latin Albums Artist of the Year	Won	
Billboard Latin Music Awards	2006	Daddy Yankee	Songwriter of the Year	Nominated	
Billboard Latin Music Awards	2006	Barrio Fino en Directo	Reggaeton Album of the Year	Won	
Billboard Latin Music Awards	2006	"Gasolina"	Latin Ringtone of the Year	Nominated	
Billboard Latin Music Awards	2006	"Lo Que Pasó, Pasó"	Latin Ringtone of the Year	Nominated	
Billboard Latin Music Awards	2006	"Lo Que Pasó, Pasó"	Reggaeton Song of the Year	Nominated	
Billboard Latin Music Awards	2006	"Mayor Que Yo"	Reggaeton Song of the Year	Won	
Billboard Latin Music Awards	2006	"Mayor Que Yo"	Hot Latin Song of the Year	Nominated	
Billboard Latin Music Awards	2006	"Mayor Que Yo"	Vocal Duet or Collaboration	Nominated	
Billboard Latin Music Awards	2007	Daddy Yankee	Artist of the Year	Nominated	
Billboard Latin Music Awards	2007	Daddy Yankee	Top Latin Albums Artist of the Year	Nominated	
Billboard Latin Music Awards	2007	"Machucando"	Reggaeton Song of the Year	Nominated	
Billboard Latin Music Awards	2008	El Cartel: The Big Boss	Latin Album of the Year	Won	
Billboard Latin Music Awards	2008	El Cartel: The Big Boss	Reggaeton Album of the Year	Won	
Billboard Latin Music Awards	2008	"Impacto"	Vocal Duet or Collaboration	Nominated	
Billboard Latin Music Awards	2009	Daddy Yankee	Spirit of Hope Award	Won	
Billboard Latin Music Awards	2009	Talento de Barrio	Top Latin Album of the Year – Male	Nominated	
Billboard Latin Music Awards	2009	Talento de Barrio	Latin Rhythm Album of the Year – Solo	Nominated	
Billboard Latin Music Awards	2009	"Pose"	Latin Rhythm Airplay Song of the Year – Solo	Nominated	
Billboard Latin Music Awards	2011	Daddy Yankee	Hot Latin Songs Artist of the Year – Male	Nominated	
Billboard Latin Music Awards	2011	Daddy Yankee	Tropical Airplay Artist of the Year – Solo	Nominated	
Billboard Latin Music Awards	2011	Daddy Yankee	Latin Rhythm Airplay Artist of the Year – Solo	Won	
Billboard Latin Music Awards	2011	Daddy Yankee	Latin Rhythm Albums Artist of the Year – Solo	Won	
Billboard Latin Music Awards	2011	Daddy Yankee	Songwriter of the Year	Nominated	
Billboard Latin Music Awards	2011	Mundial	Latin Rhythm Album of the Year	Won	
Billboard Latin Music Awards	2011	"La Despedida"	Latin Rhythm Airplay Song of the Year	Nominated	
Billboard Latin Music Awards	2013	Daddy Yankee	Hot Latin Songs Artist of the Year – Male	Nominated	
Billboard Latin Music Awards	2013	Daddy Yankee	Latin Rhythm Albums Artist of the Year – Solo	Nominated	
Billboard Latin Music Awards	2013	Daddy Yankee	Latin Rhythm Songs Artist of the Year – Solo	Nominated	
Billboard Latin Music Awards	2013	Prestige	Latin Rhythm Album of the Year	Nominated	
Billboard Latin Music Awards	2013	"Lovumba"	Latin Rhythm Song of the Year	Nominated	
Billboard Latin Music Awards	2014	Daddy Yankee	Hot Latin Songs Artist of the Year – Male	Nominated	
Billboard Latin Music Awards	2014	Daddy Yankee	Latin Pop Songs Artist of the Year – Solo	Nominated	
Billboard Latin Music Awards	2014	Daddy Yankee	Latin Rhythm Songs Artist of the Year – Solo	Nominated	
Billboard Latin Music Awards	2014	Daddy Yankee	Latin Rhythm Albums Artist of the Year – Solo	Won	
Billboard Latin Music Awards	2014	"Limbo"	Digital Song of the Year	Nominated	
Billboard Latin Music Awards	2014	"Limbo"	Latin Pop Song of the Year	Nominated	
Billboard Latin Music Awards	2014	"Limbo"	Latin Rhythm Song of the Year	Won	
Billboard Latin Music Awards	2016	Daddy Yankee	Industry Leader	Won	
Billboard Latin Music Awards	2016	Daddy Yankee	Latin Rhythm Songs Artist of the Year – Solo	Nominated	
Billboard Latin Music Awards	2017	Daddy Yankee	Hot Latin Songs Artist of the Year – Male	Nominated	
Billboard Latin Music Awards	2017	Daddy Yankee	Songwriter of the Year	Nominated	
Billboard Latin Music Awards	2017	"Shaky Shaky"	Hot Latin Song of the Year	Nominated	
Billboard Latin Music Awards	2017	"Shaky Shaky"	Streaming Song of the Year	Nominated	
Billboard Latin Music Awards	2017	"Andas En Mi Cabeza"	Latin Pop Song of the Year	Nominated	
Billboard Latin Music Awards	2018	Daddy Yankee	Artist of the Year	Nominated	
Billboard Latin Music Awards	2018	Daddy Yankee	Hot Latin Songs Artist of the Year – Male	Nominated	
Billboard Latin Music Awards	2018	Daddy Yankee	Latin Rhythm Songs Artist of the Year – Solo	Won	
Billboard Latin Music Awards	2018	Daddy Yankee	Songwriter of the Year	Won	
Billboard Latin Music Awards	2018	"Despacito"	Hot Latin Song of the Year	Won	
Billboard Latin Music Awards	2018	"Despacito"	Hot Latin Song of the Year – Vocal Event	Won	
Billboard Latin Music Awards	2018	"Despacito"	Airplay Song of the Year	Won	
Billboard Latin Music Awards	2018	"Despacito"	Digital Song of the Year	Won	
Billboard Latin Music Awards	2018	"Despacito"	Streaming Song of the Year	Won	
Billboard Latin Music Awards	2018	"Despacito"	Latin Pop Song of the Year	Won	
Billboard Latin Music Awards	2019	Daddy Yankee	Artist of the Year	Nominated	
Billboard Latin Music Awards	2019	Daddy Yankee	Hot Latin Songs Artist of the Year – Male	Nominated	
Billboard Latin Music Awards	2019	Daddy Yankee	Songwriter of the Year	Nominated	
Billboard Latin Music Awards	2019	"Dura"	Hot Latin Song of the Year	Nominated	
Billboard Latin Music Awards	2019	"Dura"	Airplay Song of the Year	Nominated	
Billboard Latin Music Awards	2019	"Dura"	Digital Song of the Year	Won	
Billboard Latin Music Awards	2019	"Dura"	Streaming Song of the Year	Nominated	
Billboard Latin Music Awards	2019	"Dura"	Latin Rhythm Song of the Year	Nominated	
Billboard Latin Music Awards	2020	Daddy Yankee	Social Artist of the Year	Nominated	
Billboard Latin Music Awards	2020	Daddy Yankee	Songwriter of the Year	Nominated	
Billboard Latin Music Awards	2020	"Con Calma"	Hot Latin Song of the Year	Won	
Billboard Latin Music Awards	2020	"Con Calma"	Hot Latin Song of the Year – Vocal Event	Won	
Billboard Latin Music Awards	2020	"Con Calma"	Airplay Song of the Year	Won	
Billboard Latin Music Awards	2020	"Con Calma"	Digital Song of the Year	Won	
Billboard Latin Music Awards	2020	"Con Calma"	Streaming Song of the Year	Won	
Billboard Latin Music Awards	2020	"Con Calma"	Latin Rhythm Song of the Year	Won	
Billboard Latin Music Awards	2020	"Baila Baila Baila" (Remix)	Latin Rhythm Song of the Year	Nominated	
Billboard Latin Music Awards	2020	"Baila Baila Baila" (Remix)	Digital Song of the Year	Nominated	
Billboard Latin Music Awards	2020	"Baila Baila Baila" (Remix)	Airplay Song of the Year	Nominated	
Billboard Latin Music Awards	2020	"China"	Airplay Song of the Year	Nominated	
Billboard Latin Music Awards	2020	"Despacito"	Latin Song of the Decade	Won	
Billboard Latin Music Awards	2021	Daddy Yankee	Hall of Fame	Inducted	
Billboard Latin Music Awards	2021	"De Vuelta Pa' La Vuelta"	Tropical Song of the Year	Nominated	
Billboard Latin Music Awards	2023	Daddy Yankee	Latin Rhythm Artist of the Year, Solo	Nominated	
Billboard Latin Music Awards	2023	Daddy Yankee	Tour of the Year	Nominated	
Billboard Latin Music Awards	2024	"Bonita"	Latin Rhythm Song of the Year	Won	
Billboard Latin Music Awards	2026	"Daddy Yankee: Bzrp Music Sessions, Vol. 0/66"	Latin Airplay Song of the Year	Nominated	
Billboard Latin Music Awards	2026	"Daddy Yankee: Bzrp Music Sessions, Vol. 0/66"	Latin Rhythm Song of the Year	Won	
Billboard Latin Music Awards	2026	"Sonriele"	Tropical Song of the Year	Nominated	
Casandra / Soberano Awards	2009	Daddy Yankee	International Casandra	Won	
Casandra / Soberano Awards	2018	Daddy Yankee	Soberano Solidarity Award	Won	
Echo Awards	2018	"Despacito"	Hit of the Year	Nominated	
El Premio de la Gente	2005	Daddy Yankee	Artist of the Year	Won	
El Premio de la Gente	2005	Daddy Yankee	Male Pop Artist or Group of the Year	Won	
El Premio de la Gente	2005	Daddy Yankee	Urban or Duranguense Artist or Group of the Year	Won	
El Premio de la Gente	2005	Barrio Fino	Album of the Year	Won	
El Premio de la Gente	2005	"Gasolina"	Music Video of the Year	Won	
Gaffa Awards	2018	"Despacito"	International Hit of the Year	Nominated	
Gardel Awards	2026	"Daddy Yankee: Bzrp Music Sessions, Vol. 0/66"	Best Collaboration	Nominated	
Gardel Awards	2026	"Daddy Yankee: Bzrp Music Sessions, Vol. 0/66"	Best Urban Song	Nominated	
Gardel Awards	2026	"Daddy Yankee: Bzrp Music Sessions, Vol. 0/66"	Best Urban Collaboration	Nominated	
Gaygalan Awards	2018	"Despacito"	Foreign Song of the Year	Nominated	
Grammy Awards	2008	El Cartel: The Big Boss	Best Latin Urban Album	Nominated	
Grammy Awards	2018	"Despacito"	Record of the Year	Nominated	
Grammy Awards	2018	"Despacito"	Song of the Year	Nominated	
Grammy Awards	2018	"Despacito"	Best Pop Duo/Group Performance	Nominated	
Grammy Awards	2023	Legendaddy	Best Música Urbana Album	Nominated	
Heat Latin Music Awards	2019	Daddy Yankee	Best Urban Artist	Nominated	
Heat Latin Music Awards	2019	"Dura"	Best Video	Nominated	
Heat Latin Music Awards	2020	Daddy Yankee	Best Male Artist	Nominated	
Heat Latin Music Awards	2020	Daddy Yankee	Best Urban Artist	Nominated	
Heat Latin Music Awards	2020	"Con Calma"	Best Video	Nominated	
Heat Latin Music Awards	2020	"China"	Best Collaboration	Nominated	
Heat Latin Music Awards	2021	"Problema"	Best Video	Nominated	
Heat Latin Music Awards	2021	"De Vuelta Pa' La Vuelta"	Best Collaboration	Nominated	
Heat Latin Music Awards	2024	"Donante de Sangre"	Best Religious Song	Nominated	
Heat Latin Music Awards	2025	"Bailando en la Lluvia"	Best Religious Song	Nominated	
Heat Latin Music Awards	2026	"ABCD"	Best Religious Song	Pending	
Hispanic Heritage Awards	2022	Daddy Yankee	Legend Award	Won	
iHeartRadio Music Awards	2018	"Despacito"	Song of the Year	Nominated	
iHeartRadio Music Awards	2018	"Despacito"	Best Collaboration	Nominated	
iHeartRadio Music Awards	2018	"Despacito"	Best Remix	Nominated	
iHeartRadio Music Awards	2018	"Despacito"	Latin Song of the Year	Won	
iHeartRadio Music Awards	2018	"Despacito"	Best Lyrics	Nominated	
iHeartRadio Music Awards	2018	"Despacito"	Best Music Video	Nominated	
iHeartRadio Music Awards	2018	"Despacito"	Titanium Award	Won	
iHeartRadio Music Awards	2018	"Havana" (Remix)	Best Remix	Nominated	
iHeartRadio Music Awards	2019	Daddy Yankee	Latin Artist of the Year	Nominated	
iHeartRadio Music Awards	2019	"Dura"	Latin Song of the Year	Nominated	
iHeartRadio Music Awards	2019	"Dura"	Best Music Video	Nominated	
iHeartRadio Music Awards	2020	Daddy Yankee	Latin Pop/Reggaeton Artist of the Year	Nominated	
iHeartRadio Music Awards	2020	"Con Calma"	Latin Pop/Urban Song of the Year	Won	
iHeartRadio Music Awards	2020	"Con Calma"	Best Music Video	Nominated	
iHeartRadio Music Awards	2020	"Con Calma"	Best Remix	Nominated	
International Dance Music Awards	2007	"Rompe"	Best Latin/Reggaeton Track	Nominated	
International Dance Music Awards	2008	"Impacto"	Best Latin/Reggaeton Track	Nominated	
International Dance Music Awards	2009	"Pose"	Best Latin/Reggaeton Track	Nominated	
International Dance Music Awards	2014	"El Amante"	Best Latin Dance Track	Nominated	
International Dance Music Awards	2016	"Vaivén"	Best Latin Dance Track	Nominated	
Kids' Choice Awards	2018	"Despacito"	Favorite Song	Nominated	
Kids' Choice Awards Argentina	2017	"Despacito"	Favorite Collaboration	Nominated	
Kids' Choice Awards Colombia	2017	"Despacito"	Favorite Song	Nominated	
Kids' Choice Awards Colombia	2017	"Despacito"	Favorite Collaboration	Nominated	
Kids' Choice Awards Mexico	2017	"Despacito"	Favorite Song	Nominated	
Kids' Choice Awards Mexico	2019	"Con Calma"	Favorite Hit	Won	
Latin American Music Awards	2015	Daddy Yankee	Favorite Urban Male Artist	Won	
Latin American Music Awards	2015	"Sígueme y Te Sigo"	Favorite Urban Song	Won	
Latin American Music Awards	2015	"Nota de Amor"	Favorite Collaboration	Nominated	
Latin American Music Awards	2016	"Andas En Mi Cabeza"	Favorite Pop/Rock Song	Nominated	
Latin American Music Awards	2017	Daddy Yankee	Artist of the Year	Nominated	
Latin American Music Awards	2017	Daddy Yankee	Favorite Urban Artist	Nominated	
Latin American Music Awards	2017	"Despacito"	Song of the Year	Nominated	
Latin American Music Awards	2017	"Despacito"	Favorite Pop/Rock Song	Nominated	
Latin American Music Awards	2017	"Despacito"	Favorite Collaboration	Nominated	
Latin American Music Awards	2018	Daddy Yankee	Artist of the Year	Nominated	
Latin American Music Awards	2018	Daddy Yankee	Favorite Male Artist	Won	
Latin American Music Awards	2018	Daddy Yankee	Icon Award	Won	
Latin American Music Awards	2018	"Dura"	Song of the Year	Nominated	
Latin American Music Awards	2018	"Dura"	Favorite Urban Song	Nominated	
Latin American Music Awards	2018	"Bella y Sensual"	Favorite Tropical Song	Nominated	
Latin American Music Awards	2018	"Azukita"	Favorite Tropical Song	Nominated	
Latin American Music Awards	2019	Daddy Yankee	Artist of the Year	Nominated	
Latin American Music Awards	2019	"Con Calma"	Song of the Year	Nominated	
Latin American Music Awards	2019	"Con Calma"	Favorite Urban Song	Nominated	
Latin American Music Awards	2019	"Si Supieras"	Favorite Video	Nominated	
Latin American Music Awards	2021	Daddy Yankee	Artist of the Year	Nominated	
Latin American Music Awards	2021	Daddy Yankee	Social Artist of the Year	Nominated	
Latin American Music Awards	2022	"De Vuelta Pa' La Vuelta"	Favorite Tropical Song	Nominated	
Latin American Music Awards	2022	"De Vuelta Pa' La Vuelta"	Collaboration of the Year	Nominated	
Latin American Music Awards	2022	"Problema"	Favorite Video	Nominated	
Latin American Music Awards	2023	Daddy Yankee	Artist of the Year	Nominated	
Latin American Music Awards	2023	Daddy Yankee	Best Urban Artist	Nominated	
Latin American Music Awards	2023	Legendaddy	Album of the Year	Nominated	
Latin American Music Awards	2023	Legendaddy	Best Urban Album	Nominated	
Latin American Music Awards	2023	"Mayor Que Usted"	Collaboration of the Year	Nominated	
Latin American Music Awards	2023	"Mayor Que Usted"	Best Pop/Urban Collaboration	Nominated	
Latin American Music Awards	2023	"Hot"	Best Pop/Urban Collaboration	Nominated	
Latin American Music Awards	2023	"Remix"	Best Urban Song	Nominated	
Latin American Music Awards	2023	La Última Vuelta World Tour	Tour of the Year	Nominated	
Latin Grammy Awards	2005	"Gasolina"	Record of the Year	Nominated	
Latin Grammy Awards	2005	Barrio Fino	Best Urban Music Album	Won	
Latin Grammy Awards	2006	Barrio Fino en Directo	Best Urban Music Album	Nominated	
Latin Grammy Awards	2007	El Cartel: The Big Boss	Best Urban Music Album	Nominated	
Latin Grammy Awards	2007	"Impacto"	Best Urban Song	Nominated	
Latin Grammy Awards	2008	"Al Son del Boom"	Best Urban Song	Nominated	
Latin Grammy Awards	2009	Talento de Barrio	Best Urban Music Album	Nominated	
Latin Grammy Awards	2009	"Llamado de Emergencia"	Best Urban Song	Nominated	
Latin Grammy Awards	2010	Mundial	Best Urban Music Album	Nominated	
Latin Grammy Awards	2010	"Descontrol"	Best Urban Song	Nominated	
Latin Grammy Awards	2010	"Grito Mundial"	Best Urban Song	Nominated	
Latin Grammy Awards	2011	"Ven Conmigo"	Best Urban Song	Nominated	
Latin Grammy Awards	2012	"Lovumba"	Best Urban Song	Nominated	
Latin Grammy Awards	2013	Prestige	Best Urban Music Album	Nominated	
Latin Grammy Awards	2013	"Limbo"	Best Urban Song	Nominated	
Latin Grammy Awards	2014	King Daddy	Best Urban Music Album	Nominated	
Latin Grammy Awards	2015	"Sígueme y Te Sigo"	Best Urban Song	Nominated	
Latin Grammy Awards	2015	"Sígueme y Te Sigo"	Best Urban Performance	Nominated	
Latin Grammy Awards	2016	"A Donde Voy"	Best Urban Song	Nominated	
Latin Grammy Awards	2017	"Despacito"	Record of the Year	Won	
Latin Grammy Awards	2017	"Despacito"	Song of the Year	Won	
Latin Grammy Awards	2017	"Despacito"	Best Urban Fusion/Performance	Won	
Latin Grammy Awards	2017	"Despacito"	Best Short Form Music Video	Won	
Latin Grammy Awards	2018	"Dura"	Best Urban Song	Won	
Latin Grammy Awards	2018	"Yo Contra Ti"	Best Urban Fusion/Performance	Nominated	
Latin Grammy Awards	2019	"Con Calma"	Best Urban Fusion/Performance	Nominated	
Latin Grammy Awards	2020	"China"	Record of the Year	Nominated	
Latin Grammy Awards	2020	"China"	Best Urban Fusion/Performance	Nominated	
Latin Grammy Awards	2022	"Agua"	Song of the Year	Nominated	
Latin Grammy Awards	2022	"El Gran Robo, Pt. 2"	Best Rap/Hip Hop Song	Nominated	
Latin Grammy Awards	2024	"Bonita"	Best Urban Song	Won	
Latin Grammy Awards	2026	Daddy Yankee	Person of the Year	Won	
Latin Grammy Awards	2026	"Daddy Yankee: Bzrp Music Sessions, Vol. 0/66"	Best Urban Song	Won	
Latin Grammy Awards	2026	"Daddy Yankee: Bzrp Music Sessions, Vol. 0/66"	Best Urban Performance	Nominated	
Latin Songwriters Hall of Fame	2017	"Despacito"	Song of the Year	Won	
Latin Songwriters Hall of Fame	2019	Daddy Yankee	Latin Songwriters Hall of Fame – Performer	Nominated	
Lo Nuestro Awards	2005	Barrio Fino	Urban Album of the Year	Won	
Lo Nuestro Awards	2006	Daddy Yankee	Urban Artist of the Year	Won	
Lo Nuestro Awards	2006	"Lo Que Pasó, Pasó"	Urban Song of the Year	Won	
Lo Nuestro Awards	2006	"Mayor Que Yo"	Urban Song of the Year	Nominated	
Lo Nuestro Awards	2006	"Mírame"	Urban Song of the Year	Nominated	
Lo Nuestro Awards	2007	Daddy Yankee	Urban Artist of the Year	Nominated	
Lo Nuestro Awards	2007	Barrio Fino en Directo	Urban Album of the Year	Won	
Lo Nuestro Awards	2007	"Machucando"	Urban Song of the Year	Nominated	
Lo Nuestro Awards	2007	"Rompe"	Urban Song of the Year	Nominated	
Lo Nuestro Awards	2008	El Cartel: The Big Boss	Urban Album of the Year	Nominated	
Lo Nuestro Awards	2008	"Impacto"	Urban Song of the Year	Nominated	
Lo Nuestro Awards	2008	"Impacto"	Video of the Year	Won	
Lo Nuestro Awards	2009	Daddy Yankee	Urban Artist of the Year	Nominated	
Lo Nuestro Awards	2009	"Pose"	Video of the Year	Won	
Lo Nuestro Awards	2010	Daddy Yankee	Urban Artist of the Year	Nominated	
Lo Nuestro Awards	2010	"¿Qué Tengo Que Hacer?"	Urban Song of the Year	Nominated	
Lo Nuestro Awards	2011	Daddy Yankee	Urban Artist of the Year	Nominated	
Lo Nuestro Awards	2011	Mundial	Urban Album of the Year	Nominated	
Lo Nuestro Awards	2011	"Descontrol"	Urban Song of the Year	Nominated	
Lo Nuestro Awards	2012	Daddy Yankee	Urban Artist of the Year	Nominated	
Lo Nuestro Awards	2012	"Ven Conmigo"	Collaboration of the Year	Won	
Lo Nuestro Awards	2012	"Ven Conmigo"	Urban Song of the Year	Nominated	
Lo Nuestro Awards	2013	Daddy Yankee	Urban Artist of the Year	Nominated	
Lo Nuestro Awards	2013	Prestige	Urban Album of the Year	Nominated	
Lo Nuestro Awards	2013	"Lovumba"	Urban Song of the Year	Won	
Lo Nuestro Awards	2014	Daddy Yankee	Urban Artist of the Year	Nominated	
Lo Nuestro Awards	2014	"Limbo"	Urban Song of the Year	Nominated	
Lo Nuestro Awards	2015	Daddy Yankee	Urban Artist of the Year	Nominated	
Lo Nuestro Awards	2015	King Daddy	Urban Album of the Year	Nominated	
Lo Nuestro Awards	2015	"La Nueva y La Ex"	Urban Song of the Year	Nominated	
Lo Nuestro Awards	2015	"Ora Por Mí"	Video of the Year	Nominated	
Lo Nuestro Awards	2015	"Moviendo Caderas"	Urban Collaboration of the Year	Nominated	
Lo Nuestro Awards	2017	Daddy Yankee	Urban Artist of the Year	Nominated	
Lo Nuestro Awards	2017	"Vaivén"	Urban Song of the Year	Nominated	
Lo Nuestro Awards	2017	"Andas En Mi Cabeza"	Tropical Song of the Year	Nominated	
Lo Nuestro Awards	2017	"Andas En Mi Cabeza"	Video of the Year	Nominated	
Lo Nuestro Awards	2017	"Mayor Que Yo 3"	Urban Collaboration of the Year	Nominated	
Lo Nuestro Awards	2017	"Not A Crime"	Urban Collaboration of the Year	Nominated	
Lo Nuestro Awards	2019	Daddy Yankee	Urban Male Artist of the Year	Nominated	
Lo Nuestro Awards	2019	Daddy Yankee	Lifetime Achievement Award	Won	
Lo Nuestro Awards	2019	"Dura"	Urban Song of the Year	Nominated	
Lo Nuestro Awards	2019	"Dura"	Urban Collaboration of the Year	Nominated	
Lo Nuestro Awards	2019	"Dura"	Remix of the Year	Nominated	
Lo Nuestro Awards	2019	"Inolvidable" (Remix)	Remix of the Year	Nominated	
Lo Nuestro Awards	2020	Daddy Yankee	Artist of the Year	Won	
Lo Nuestro Awards	2020	Daddy Yankee	Urban Male Artist of the Year	Won	
Lo Nuestro Awards	2020	"Con Calma"	Song of the Year	Won	
Lo Nuestro Awards	2020	"Con Calma"	Single of the Year	Won	
Lo Nuestro Awards	2020	"Con Calma"	Crossover Collaboration of the Year	Won	
Lo Nuestro Awards	2020	"Con Calma"	Urban Song of the Year	Won	
Lo Nuestro Awards	2020	"Con Calma"	Urban Collaboration of the Year	Nominated	
Lo Nuestro Awards	2020	"No Lo Trates"	Urban Collaboration of the Year	Nominated	
Lo Nuestro Awards	2020	"No Lo Trates"	Urban Song of the Year	Nominated	
Lo Nuestro Awards	2020	"Baila Baila Baila" (Remix)	Remix of the Year	Nominated	
Lo Nuestro Awards	2020	"Soltera" (Remix)	Remix of the Year	Won	
Lo Nuestro Awards	2020	"Runaway"	Crossover Collaboration of the Year	Nominated	
Lo Nuestro Awards	2021	Daddy Yankee	Urban Male Artist of the Year	Nominated	
Lo Nuestro Awards	2021	"Muévelo"	Urban Collaboration of the Year	Nominated	
Lo Nuestro Awards	2021	"Muévelo"	Urban Song of the Year	Nominated	
Lo Nuestro Awards	2021	"Que Tire Pa' Lante"	Urban Song of the Year	Nominated	
Lo Nuestro Awards	2021	"Relación" (Remix)	Remix of the Year	Nominated	
Lo Nuestro Awards	2022	Daddy Yankee	Urban Male Artist of the Year	Nominated	
Lo Nuestro Awards	2022	"De Vuelta Pa' La Vuelta"	Song of the Year	Nominated	
Lo Nuestro Awards	2022	"De Vuelta Pa' La Vuelta"	The Perfect Mix of the Year	Nominated	
Lo Nuestro Awards	2022	"De Vuelta Pa' La Vuelta"	Tropical Song of the Year	Nominated	
Lo Nuestro Awards	2022	"De Vuelta Pa' La Vuelta"	Tropical Collaboration of the Year	Won	
Lo Nuestro Awards	2022	"Problema"	Urban Song of the Year	Nominated	
Lo Nuestro Awards	2023	Daddy Yankee	Urban Male Artist of the Year	Won	
Lo Nuestro Awards	2023	Legendaddy	Album of the Year	Nominated	
Lo Nuestro Awards	2023	Legendaddy	Urban Album of the Year	Nominated	
Lo Nuestro Awards	2023	"Hot"	Pop Urban/Dance Song of the Year	Nominated	
Lo Nuestro Awards	2023	"Remix"	Urban Song of the Year	Nominated	
Lo Nuestro Awards	2023	"Sal y Perrea" (Remix)	Remix of the Year	Won	
Lo Nuestro Awards	2023	"Mayor Que Usted"	Urban Collaboration of the Year	Nominated	
Lo Nuestro Awards	2023	La Última Vuelta World Tour	Tour of the Year	Won	
Lo Nuestro Awards	2024	Daddy Yankee	Urban Male Artist of the Year	Nominated	
Lo Nuestro Awards	2024	"Bailar Contigo"	Crossover Collaboration of the Year	Won	
Lo Nuestro Awards	2024	"Panties y Brasieres"	Urban Song of the Year	Nominated	
Lo Nuestro Awards	2024	"Ulala"	Urban Collaboration of the Year	Nominated	
Lo Nuestro Awards	2025	"Bonita"	Christian Music Song of the Year	Won	
Lo Nuestro Awards	2025	"Loveo"	Pop-Urban Song of the Year	Nominated	
Lo Nuestro Awards	2026	“Daddy Yankee: Bzrp Music Sessions, Vol.0/66”	Urban Song of the Year	Nominated	
Lo Nuestro Awards	2026	“Sonríele”	Christian Music Song of the Year	Won	
LOS40 Music Awards	2012	Daddy Yankee	Best Urban Act	Nominated	
LOS40 Music Awards	2012	Prestige	Best American Album	Nominated	
LOS40 Music Awards	2012	"Lovumba"	Best American Song	Nominated	
LOS40 Music Awards	2014	Daddy Yankee	Best Spanish Language Act	Nominated	
LOS40 Music Awards	2017	"Despacito"	International Song of the Year	Won	
LOS40 Music Awards	2017	"Despacito"	Golden Music Award	Won	
LOS40 Music Awards	2017	"Despacito"	International Video of the Year	Nominated	
LOS40 Music Awards	2017	"Despacito"	LOS40 Global Show Song	Nominated	
LOS40 Music Awards	2018	Daddy Yankee	Best Latin Artist or Group	Nominated	
LOS40 Music Awards	2018	"Dura"	LOS40 Global Show Song	Nominated	
LOS40 Music Awards	2019	Daddy Yankee	LOS40 Urban Artist of Producer	Nominated	
LOS40 Music Awards	2019	"Con Calma"	LOS40 Global Show Song	Nominated	
LOS40 Music Awards	2022	Legendaddy	Global Latin – Best Album	Nominated	
LOS40 Music Awards	2022	"Rumbatón"	Global Latin – Best Video	Nominated	
Meus Prêmios Nick	2017	"Despacito"	Favorite International Hit	Nominated	
Meus Prêmios Nick	2017	"Despacito"	Favorite Collaboration	Nominated	
Monitor Latino Music Awards	2020	Daddy Yankee	Urban Artist of the Year	Nominated	
Monitor Latino Music Awards	2020	"Que Tire Pa' Lante"	Urban Song of the Year	Nominated	
Monitor Latino Music Awards	2020	"China"	Urban Song of the Year	Nominated	
Monitor Latino Music Awards	2020	"China"	Collaboration of the Year	Nominated	
Monitor Latino Music Awards	2021	Daddy Yankee	Male Artist of the Year	Nominated	
Monitor Latino Music Awards	2021	Daddy Yankee	Urban Legend Recognition	Won	
Monitor Latino Music Awards	2021	"De Vuelta Pa' La Vuelta"	Tropical Song of the Year	Won	
Monitor Latino Music Awards	2021	"Relación" (Remix)	Urban Song of the Year	Nominated	
MTV Video Music Awards	2005	"Gasolina"	MTV2 Award	Nominated	
MTV Video Music Awards	2006	"Rompe"	Best Hip Hop Video	Nominated	
MTV Video Music Awards	2010	Daddy Yankee	Best Latino Artist	Nominated	
MTV Video Music Awards	2013	Daddy Yankee	Best Latino Artist	Won	
MTV Video Music Awards	2017	"Despacito"	Song of the Summer	Nominated	
MTV Video Music Awards	2018	"Dura"	Best Latin	Nominated	
MTV Video Music Awards	2019	"Con Calma"	Best Latin	Nominated	
MTV Europe Music Awards	2017	"Despacito"	Best Song	Nominated	
MTV Europe Music Awards	2019	Daddy Yankee	Best Caribbean Act	Nominated	
MTV Europe Music Awards	2022	Daddy Yankee	Best Caribbean Act	Won	
MTV Millennial Awards	2017	"Despacito"	Collaboration of the Year	Nominated	
MTV Millennial Awards	2017	"Despacito"	Best Party Anthem	Won	
MTV Millennial Awards	2018	"Dura"	Hit of the Year	Nominated	
MTV Millennial Awards	2019	"Con Calma"	Hit of the Year	Nominated	
MTV Millennial Awards	2021	"Relación" (Remix)	Hit of the Year	Nominated	
MTV Video Music Awards Japan	2006	"Gasolina"	Best Reggae Video	Nominated	
NRJ Music Awards	2017	"Despacito"	International Song of the Year	Won	
Orgullosamente Latino Awards	2009	Daddy Yankee	Latin Soloist of the Year	Nominated	
Orgullosamente Latino Awards	2009	Talento de Barrio	Latin Album of the Year	Nominated	
Orgullosamente Latino Awards	2009	"Llamado de Emergencia"	Latin Song of the Year	Nominated	
Orgullosamente Latino Awards	2009	"Llamado de Emergencia"	Latin Video of the Year	Won	
People's Choice Awards	2019	Daddy Yankee	Latin Artist	Nominated	
People's Choice Awards	2019	"Con Calma"	Music Video	Nominated	
People's Choice Awards	2021	Daddy Yankee	Latin Artist	Nominated	
People's Choice Reggaeton and Urban Awards	2007	Barrio Fino en Directo	Best Hits Compilation Album	Won	
People's Choice Reggaeton and Urban Awards	2007	"Gangsta Zone"	Best Collaboration with an International Artist	Won	
People en Español Festival	2016	Daddy Yankee	Twentieth Anniversary Award	Won	
People en Español Awards	2010	Daddy Yankee	Best Urban Singer or Group	Nominated	
People en Español Awards	2012	Daddy Yankee	Best Male Singer	Nominated	
People en Español Awards	2012	"Pasarela"	Song of the Year	Nominated	
People en Español Awards	2013	Daddy Yankee	Best Male Singer	Won	
People en Español Awards	2013	"Limbo"	Song of the Year	Won	
People en Español Awards	2013	"Limbo"	Video of the Year	Won	
People en Español Awards	2013	"La Noche de Los Dos"	Collaboration of the Year	Nominated	
Pollstar Awards	2023	La Última Vuelta World Tour	Latin Tour of the Year	Nominated	
Premios Juventud	2005	Daddy Yankee	Voice of the Moment	Won	
Premios Juventud	2005	Daddy Yankee	Favorite Concert	Won	
Premios Juventud	2005	Daddy Yankee	Favorite Urban Artist	Won	
Premios Juventud	2005	Daddy Yankee	He's Got Style	Won	
Premios Juventud	2005	Daddy Yankee	What A Hottie!	Won	
Premios Juventud	2005	Daddy Yankee	My Idol Is...	Nominated	
Premios Juventud	2005	Daddy Yankee	The Most Searched Online	Won	
Premios Juventud	2005	Barrio Fino	CD To Die For	Nominated	
Premios Juventud	2005	"Gasolina"	Catchiest Tune	Won	
Premios Juventud	2006	Daddy Yankee	Voice of the Moment	Nominated	
Premios Juventud	2006	Daddy Yankee	Favorite Concert	Nominated	
Premios Juventud	2006	Daddy Yankee	Favorite Urban Artist	Won	
Premios Juventud	2006	Daddy Yankee	He's Got Style	Nominated	
Premios Juventud	2006	Daddy Yankee	What A Hottie!	Nominated	
Premios Juventud	2006	Daddy Yankee	My Idol Is...	Nominated	
Premios Juventud	2006	Barrio Fino en Directo	CD To Die For	Nominated	
Premios Juventud	2006	"Rompe"	Catchiest Tune	Nominated	
Premios Juventud	2006	"Mayor Que Yo"	The Perfect Combination	Won	
Premios Juventud	2007	Daddy Yankee	Favorite Urban Artist	Won	
Premios Juventud	2007	Daddy Yankee	He's Got Style	Nominated	
Premios Juventud	2007	Daddy Yankee	What A Hottie!	Nominated	
Premios Juventud	2007	"Noche de Entierro"	The Perfect Combination	Won	
Premios Juventud	2007	"Noche de Entierro"	Favorite Video	Won	
Premios Juventud	2008	Daddy Yankee	Favorite Urban Artist	Nominated	
Premios Juventud	2008	Daddy Yankee	He's Got Style	Nominated	
Premios Juventud	2008	Daddy Yankee	What A Hottie!	Nominated	
Premios Juventud	2008	Daddy Yankee	My Idol Is...	Nominated	
Premios Juventud	2008	El Cartel: The Big Boss	CD To Die For	Nominated	
Premios Juventud	2008	"Impacto"	Favorite Ringtone	Nominated	
Premios Juventud	2008	"Rompe"	Favorite Ringtone	Nominated	
Premios Juventud	2008	Big Boss Tour	Favorite Tour	Nominated	
Premios Juventud	2009	Daddy Yankee	Favorite Concert	Nominated	
Premios Juventud	2009	Daddy Yankee	Favorite Urban Artist	Nominated	
Premios Juventud	2009	Daddy Yankee	What An Actor!	Nominated	
Premios Juventud	2009	Talento de Barrio	CD To Die For	Nominated	
Premios Juventud	2009	"Llamado de Emergencia"	Favorite Ringtone	Nominated	
Premios Juventud	2010	Daddy Yankee	Favorite Urban Artist	Nominated	
Premios Juventud	2011	Daddy Yankee	Favorite Urban Artist	Nominated	
Premios Juventud	2012	Daddy Yankee	Favorite Urban Artist	Nominated	
Premios Juventud	2012	"Lovumba"	Catchiest Tune	Nominated	
Premios Juventud	2012	"Lovumba"	Favorite Video	Nominated	
Premios Juventud	2012	"Lovumba"	Favorite Ringtone	Nominated	
Premios Juventud	2012	"Ven Conmigo"	The Perfect Combination	Nominated	
Premios Juventud	2013	Daddy Yankee	Favorite Urban Artist	Nominated	
Premios Juventud	2013	Prestige	CD To Die For	Nominated	
Premios Juventud	2013	"Limbo"	Catchiest Tune	Nominated	
Premios Juventud	2013	"Limbo"	Favorite Video	Nominated	
Premios Juventud	2013	"Limbo"	Favorite Ringtone	Nominated	
Premios Juventud	2014	Daddy Yankee	Favorite Urban Artist	Nominated	
Premios Juventud	2015	Daddy Yankee	Favorite Urban Artist	Nominated	
Premios Juventud	2016	Daddy Yankee	Favorite Urban Artist	Nominated	
Premios Juventud	2017	"Shaky Shaky"	Best Song for Dancing	Won	
Premios Juventud	2017	"Despacito"	Perfect Combination	Won	
Premios Juventud	2017	"Despacito"	Best Song for Singing	Won	
Premios Juventud	2017	"Tú y Yo"	Best Song for Loving	Nominated	
Premios Juventud	2017	"Andas En Mi Cabeza"	Best Video	Nominated	
Premios Juventud	2019	Daddy Yankee	Multi-Tasker: Singer, Songwriter and Composer	Won	
Premios Juventud	2019	Daddy Yankee	High Fashion	Nominated	
Premios Juventud	2019	"Con Calma"	Traffic Jam Song	Nominated	
Premios Juventud	2019	"Con Calma"	Singing in the Shower	Nominated	
Premios Juventud	2019	"Con Calma"	Sick Dance Routine	Won	
Premios Juventud	2019	"Con Calma"	Can't Get Enough of This Song	Nominated	
Premios Juventud	2019	"Adictiva"	Can't Get Enough of This Song	Nominated	
Premios Juventud	2020	Daddy Yankee	And Featuring...	Nominated	
Premios Juventud	2020	"China"	The Perfect Mix	Won	
Premios Juventud	2020	"China"	The Traffic Jam	Won	
Premios Juventud	2020	"Que Tire Pa' Lante"	The Traffic Jam	Nominated	
Premios Juventud	2020	"Que Tire Pa' Lante"	This Choreo Is On Fire	Won	
Premios Juventud	2021	Daddy Yankee	Male Artist	Nominated	
Premios Juventud	2021	Daddy Yankee	Agent of Change Award	Won	
Premios Juventud	2021	"De Vuelta Pa' La Vuelta"	Song of the Year	Nominated	
Premios Juventud	2021	"De Vuelta Pa' La Vuelta"	Tropical Mix	Nominated	
Premios Juventud	2021	"De Vuelta Pa' La Vuelta"	The Most Catchy	Nominated	
Premios Juventud	2021	"De Vuelta Pa' La Vuelta"	Viral Track of the Year	Nominated	
Premios Juventud	2021	"Relación" (Remix)	Viral Track of the Year	Nominated	
Premios Juventud	2021	"Relación" (Remix)	The Traffic Jam	Nominated	
Premios Juventud	2021	"Relación" (Remix)	The Perfect Mix	Won	
Premios Juventud	2021	"Problema"	This Choreo Is On Fire	Nominated	
Premios Juventud	2022	Daddy Yankee	Favorite Streaming Artist	Nominated	
Premios Juventud	2022	Legendaddy	Album of the Year	Nominated	
Premios Juventud	2022	"Bombón"	Best Social Dance Challenge	Nominated	
Premios Juventud	2023	Daddy Yankee	Male Artist	Nominated	
Premios Juventud	2023	"Rumbatón"	Best Urban Track	Nominated	
Premios Juventud	2023	"Hot"	Best Pop/Urban Song	Nominated	
Premios Juventud	2023	"Mayor Que Usted"	Best Pop/Urban Collaboration	Nominated	
Premios Juventud	2023	"Mayor Que Usted"	Hottest Choreo	Won	
Premios Juventud	2023	"Bailar Contigo"	OMG Collaboration	Nominated	
Premios Juventud	2023	"Ulala"	Best Urban Mix	Nominated	
Premios Juventud	2024	"Bonita"	Best Pop/Urban Song	Won	
Premios Juventud	2025	"Loveo"	Best Pop/Rhythmic Song	Nominated	
Premios Juventud	2026	Lamento en Baile	Album of the Year	Nominated	
Premios Juventud	2026	"Daddy Yankee: Bzrp Music Sessions, Vol. 0/66"	Best Urban Track	Won	
Premios Musa	2022	Daddy Yankee	International Latin Artist of the Year	Nominated	
Premios MTV Latinoamérica	2005	Daddy Yankee	Best Male Artist	Nominated	
Premios MTV Latinoamérica	2006	Daddy Yankee	Artist of the Year	Won	
Premios MTV Latinoamérica	2006	Daddy Yankee	Best Solo Artist	Nominated	
Premios MTV Latinoamérica	2006	Daddy Yankee	MTV Tr3s Viewer's Choice Award	Nominated	
Premios MTV Latinoamérica	2007	Daddy Yankee	Best Solo Artist	Nominated	
Premios MTV Latinoamérica	2007	Daddy Yankee	Best Urban Artist	Won	
Premios MTV Latinoamérica	2007	Daddy Yankee	MTV Tr3s Viewer's Choice Award – Best Pop Artist	Nominated	
Premios MTV Latinoamérica	2007	Daddy Yankee	Fashionista Award – Male	Nominated	
Premios MTV Latinoamérica	2009	Daddy Yankee	Best Solo Artist	Nominated	
Premios MTV Latinoamérica	2009	Daddy Yankee	Best Urban Artist	Nominated	
Premios Odeón	2020	Daddy Yankee	Latin Artist	Nominated	
Premios Oye!	2006	Barrio Fino en Directo	Reggaeton Soloist or Group	Won	
Premios Oye!	2007	"Rompe"	Best Selling Ringtone	Won	
Premios Tu Mundo	2013	Daddy Yankee	Musical Power Award	Won	
Premios Tu Mundo	2013	"Limbo"	Party-Starter Song	Nominated	
Premios Tu Mundo	2014	Daddy Yankee	Favorite Urban Artist	Won	
Premios Tu Mundo	2015	Daddy Yankee	Favorite Urban Artist	Won	
Premios Tu Mundo	2015	DYArmy	Fan Club of the Year	Won	
Premios Tu Mundo	2016	Daddy Yankee	Favorite Urban Artist	Won	
Premios Tu Mundo	2016	"Andas En Mi Cabeza"	Party-Starter Song	Won	
Premios Tu Mundo	2016	DYArmy	Fan Club of the Year	Won	
Premios Tu Mundo	2017	"Despacito"	Party-Starter Song	Nominated	
Premios Tu Música Urbano	2019	Daddy Yankee	Artist of the Year	Nominated	
Premios Tu Música Urbano	2019	Daddy Yankee	Urban Male Artist	Nominated	
Premios Tu Música Urbano	2019	Daddy Yankee	Songwriter of the Year	Won	
Premios Tu Música Urbano	2019	Daddy Yankee	Humanitarian Award	Won	
Premios Tu Música Urbano	2019	"Dura"	Song of the Year	Won	
Premios Tu Música Urbano	2019	"Dura"	Video of the Year	Nominated	
Premios Tu Música Urbano	2019	"Asesina" (Remix)	Video of the Year	Nominated	
Premios Tu Música Urbano	2019	"Asesina" (Remix)	Remix of the Year	Nominated	
Premios Tu Música Urbano	2019	"Dura" (Remix)	Remix of the Year	Nominated	
Premios Tu Música Urbano	2019	"Inolvidable" (Remix)	Remix of the Year	Nominated	
Premios Tu Música Urbano	2019	"Zum Zum" (Remix)	Remix of the Year	Nominated	
Premios Tu Música Urbano	2020	Daddy Yankee	Artist of the Year	Won	
Premios Tu Música Urbano	2020	Daddy Yankee	Top Male Artist	Nominated	
Premios Tu Música Urbano	2020	Daddy Yankee	Songwriter of the Year	Nominated	
Premios Tu Música Urbano	2020	"Con Calma"	Song of the Year	Won	
Premios Tu Música Urbano	2020	"Con Calma"	Male Song	Won	
Premios Tu Música Urbano	2020	"Que Tire Pa' Lante"	Male Song	Nominated	
Premios Tu Música Urbano	2020	"China"	Collaboration of the Year	Won	
Premios Tu Música Urbano	2020	"China"	Video of the Year	Nominated	
Premios Tu Música Urbano	2020	"China"	Song of the Year	Nominated	
Premios Tu Música Urbano	2020	"Soltera" (Remix)	Song of the Year	Nominated	
Premios Tu Música Urbano	2020	"Soltera" (Remix)	Remix of the Year – New Generation	Won	
Premios Tu Música Urbano	2020	"Soltera" (Remix)	Video of the Year	Nominated	
Premios Tu Música Urbano	2020	"Con Calma" (Remix)	Remix of the Year	Nominated	
Premios Tu Música Urbano	2020	"Si Supieras"	Collaboration of the Year	Nominated	
Premios Tu Música Urbano	2020	"Adictiva"	Collaboration of the Year	Nominated	
Premios Tu Música Urbano	2020	Con Calma Pa'l Choli	Concert of the Year	Won	
Premios Tu Música Urbano	2022	Daddy Yankee	Top Male Artist	Won	
Premios Tu Música Urbano	2022	Legendaddy	Album of the Year – Male Artist	Won	
Premios Tu Música Urbano	2022	"X Última Vez"	Top Pop Urban Song	Won	
Premios Tu Música Urbano	2022	"Agua"	Video of the Year	Nominated	
Premios Tu Música Urbano	2022	"Sal y Perrea" (Remix)	Remix of the Year	Nominated	
Premios Tu Música Urbano	2023	"Bombón"	Video of the Year	Nominated	
Premios Tu Música Urbano	2023	La Última Vuelta World Tour	Tour of the Year	Nominated	
Premios Tu Música Urbano	2025	Daddy Yankee	Top Christian-Spiritual Artist	Nominated	
Premios Tu Música Urbano	2025	"Loveo"	Top Christian-Spiritual Song	Won	
Premios Tu Música Urbano	2026	Daddy Yankee	Top Christian-Spiritual Artist	Won	
Premios Tu Música Urbano	2026	"Daddy Yankee: Bzrp Music Sessions, Vol. 0/66"	Song of the Year	Won	
Premios Tu Música Urbano	2026	“Sonríele”	Top Christian-Spiritual Song	Won	
Presencia Latina at Harvard University	2008	Daddy Yankee	Latino of the Year	Won	
Spotify Awards	2020	Daddy Yankee	Artist of the Year	Nominated	
Spotify Awards	2020	Daddy Yankee	Most-Streamed Male Artist	Nominated	
Spotify Awards	2020	Daddy Yankee	Most-Shared Artist	Nominated	
Spotify Awards	2020	Daddy Yankee	Most-Added to Playlists Artist	Nominated	
Spotify Awards	2020	Daddy Yankee	Most-Streamed Male Artist by Users Between 18 and 29 Years Old	Nominated	
Spotify Awards	2020	Daddy Yankee	Most-Streamed Male Artist by Users Between 30 and 44 Years Old	Nominated	
Spotify Awards	2020	"Con Calma"	Most-Streamed Track	Nominated	
Spotify Awards	2020	"Con Calma"	Songwriter of the Top-Streamed Song	Nominated	
Spotify Awards	2020	"Con Calma"	Song With the Most Days in the Top 50	Nominated	
Spotify Awards	2020	"China"	Most-Streamed Song of the Summer	Nominated	
Tecla Awards	2016	Daddy Yankee	Best Musician/Band/Group on Social Media	Nominated	
Teen Choice Awards	2017	Daddy Yankee	Choice Latin Artist	Nominated	
Teen Choice Awards	2017	"Despacito"	Choice Song – Male Artist	Nominated	
Teen Choice Awards	2017	"Despacito"	Choice Latin Song	Won	
Teen Choice Awards	2017	"Despacito"	Choice Summer Song	Won	
Teen Choice Awards	2018	Daddy Yankee	Choice Latin Artist	Nominated	
Teen Choice Awards	2018	"Boom Boom"	Choice Latin Song	Nominated	
Teen Choice Awards	2019	Daddy Yankee	Choice Latin Artist	Nominated	
Teen Choice Awards	2019	Daddy Yankee	Choice Summer Male Artist	Nominated	
Teen Choice Awards	2019	"Con Calma"	Choice Latin Song	Nominated	
Teen Choice Awards	2019	"Baila Baila Baila" (Remix)	Choice Latin Song	Nominated	
World Music Awards	2006	Daddy Yankee	World's Best Selling Latin Artist	Nominated	

== Other accolades ==
=== State and cultural honours ===
Daddy Yankee's state and cultural honours
Country	Year	Honour	Ref.
Puerto Rico	2017	Puerto Rico's Walk of Fame Star	
United States	2023	"Gasolina" inducted into the National Recording Registry	

=== World records ===
Daddy Yankee's world records
Publication	Year	Holder	World record	Ref.
Guinness World Records	2018	Daddy Yankee	First Latin artist to reach number one on Spotify's Global Artist chart	(Note: Although the Guinness World Records' website recognized Daddy Yankee for having the most weeks at number one on Billboard's Hot Latin Songs chart (for "Despacito") and the most Lo Nuestro Award nominations, he had not received a physical award for those records.)
Guinness World Records	2018	Daddy Yankee	Most number one singles on the Billboard Latin Rhythm Airplay chart (Note: Record surpassed by J Balvin on December 31, 2021. Retaken on April 8, 2023.)	(Note: Although the Guinness World Records' website recognized Daddy Yankee for having the most weeks at number one on Billboard's Hot Latin Songs chart (for "Despacito") and the most Lo Nuestro Award nominations, he had not received a physical award for those records.)
Guinness World Records	2018	Daddy Yankee	Most titles charted on the Billboard Latin Rhythm Airplay chart	(Note: Although the Guinness World Records' website recognized Daddy Yankee for having the most weeks at number one on Billboard's Hot Latin Songs chart (for "Despacito") and the most Lo Nuestro Award nominations, he had not received a physical award for those records.)
Guinness World Records	2018	"Despacito"	Most viewed video online (Note: Record surpassed by Pinkfong's "Baby Shark" on November 2, 2020)	(Note: Although the Guinness World Records' website recognized Daddy Yankee for having the most weeks at number one on Billboard's Hot Latin Songs chart (for "Despacito") and the most Lo Nuestro Award nominations, he had not received a physical award for those records.)
Guinness World Records	2018	"Despacito"	Most viewed music video online	(Note: Although the Guinness World Records' website recognized Daddy Yankee for having the most weeks at number one on Billboard's Hot Latin Songs chart (for "Despacito") and the most Lo Nuestro Award nominations, he had not received a physical award for those records.)
Guinness World Records	2018	"Despacito"	Most viewed music video on YouTube – Duet	(Note: Although the Guinness World Records' website recognized Daddy Yankee for having the most weeks at number one on Billboard's Hot Latin Songs chart (for "Despacito") and the most Lo Nuestro Award nominations, he had not received a physical award for those records.)
Guinness World Records	2018	"Despacito"	Most weeks at number one in the United States – Single (Note: Record surpassed by Lil Nas X's "Old Town Road" featuring Billy Ray Cyrus on July 29, 2019)	(Note: Although the Guinness World Records' website recognized Daddy Yankee for having the most weeks at number one on Billboard's Hot Latin Songs chart (for "Despacito") and the most Lo Nuestro Award nominations, he had not received a physical award for those records.)
Guinness World Records	2018	"Despacito"	Most liked video online	(Note: Although the Guinness World Records' website recognized Daddy Yankee for having the most weeks at number one on Billboard's Hot Latin Songs chart (for "Despacito") and the most Lo Nuestro Award nominations, he had not received a physical award for those records.)
Guinness World Records	2018	"Despacito"	First YouTube video to receive five billion views	(Note: Although the Guinness World Records' website recognized Daddy Yankee for having the most weeks at number one on Billboard's Hot Latin Songs chart (for "Despacito") and the most Lo Nuestro Award nominations, he had not received a physical award for those records.)
Guinness World Records	2018	"Despacito"	Most streamed track worldwide	(Note: Although the Guinness World Records' website recognized Daddy Yankee for having the most weeks at number one on Billboard's Hot Latin Songs chart (for "Despacito") and the most Lo Nuestro Award nominations, he had not received a physical award for those records.)
