= Billboard Latin Music Award for Digital Song of the Year =

Former American music award

- Current: 2020 Billboard Latin Music Awards
- Awarded for: the best selling Latin songs in Billboard magazine
- Country: United States
- Presented by: Billboard
- First award: 2010
- Final award: 2020
- Currently held by: "Con Calma" by Daddy Yankee featuring Snow (2020)

Highlights
- Most awards: Daddy Yankee (3)
- Most nominations: Shakira (7)
- Website: billboardevents.com

The Billboard Latin Music Award for Digital Song of the Year (formerly Latin Digital Download of the Year) is an honor presented annually at the Billboard Latin Music Awards, a ceremony which honors "the most popular albums, songs, and performers in Latin music, as determined by the actual sales, radio airplay, online streaming and social data that informs Billboard's weekly charts." The award is given to the best performing singles on Billboard's Latin Digital Songs chart, which measures the best selling Spanish-language recordings in the United States. The list was established by the magazine on January 23, 2010.

Daddy Yankee is the most awarded act in the category with three wins. The award has not been given out since 2020, its last recipient being Daddy Yankee and Snow for their song Con Calma.

== Recipients ==
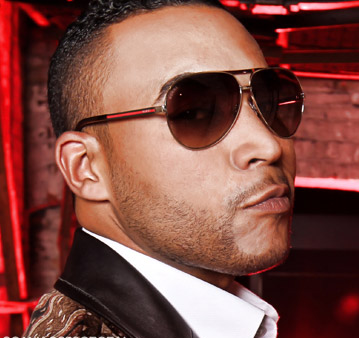
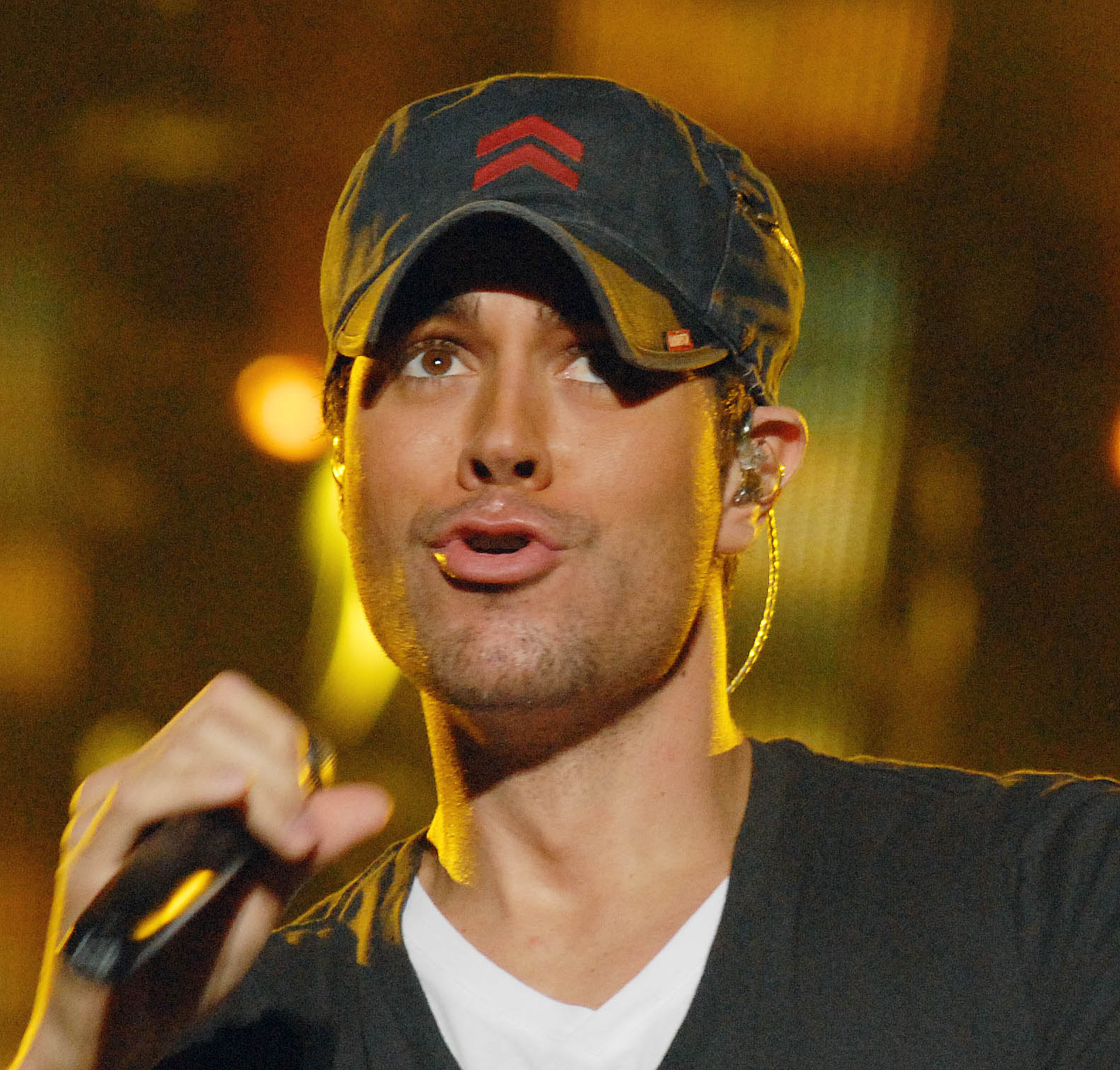

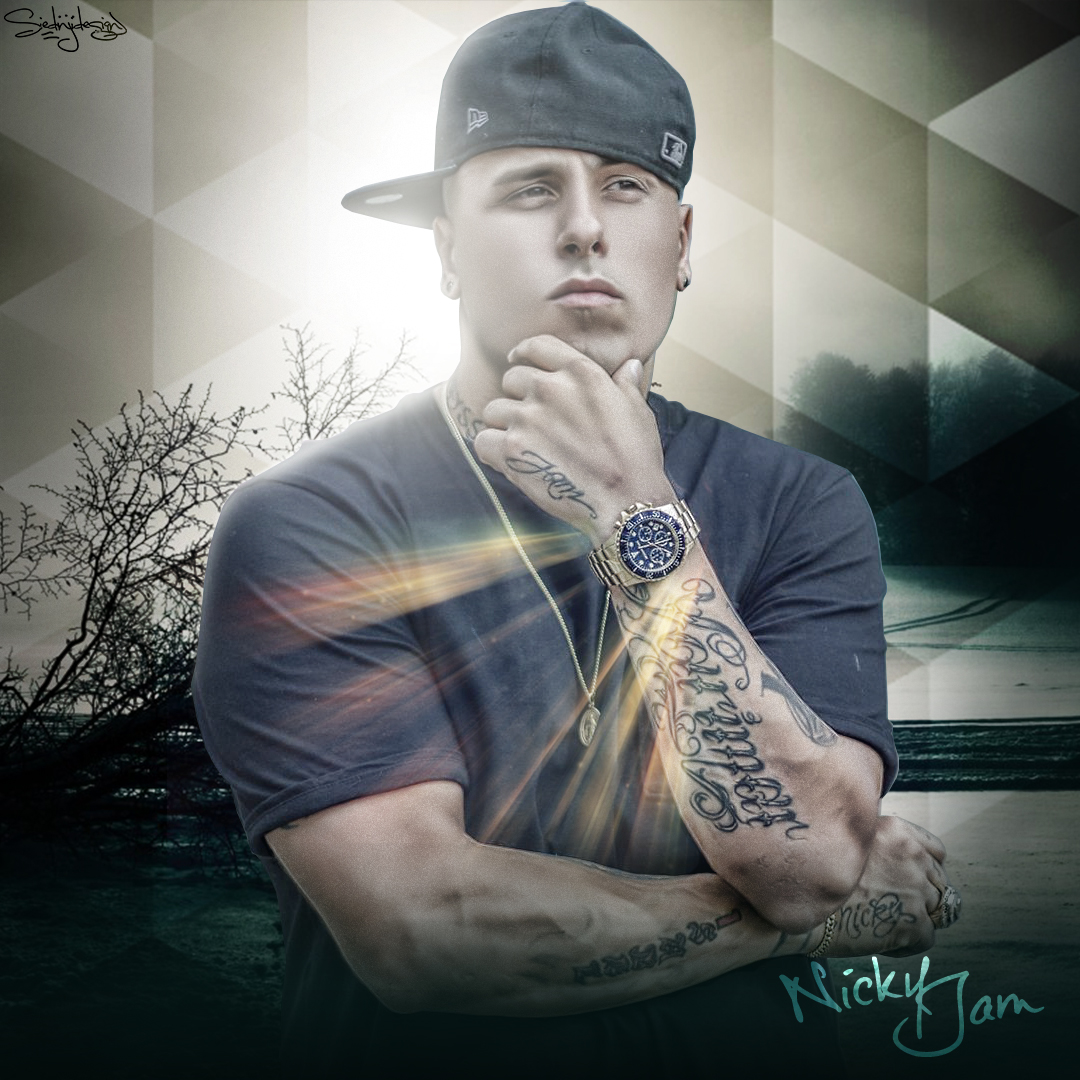
Two-time winners Don Omar (top), Enrique Iglesias (middle) and Nicky Jam (bottom)

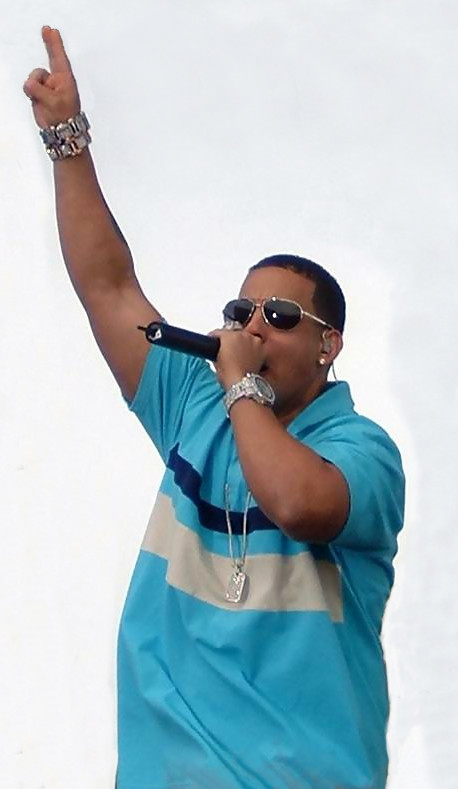
Three-time winner and current holder Daddy Yankee

Year	Performing artist(s)	Work	Nominees	Ref.
2010	Tito El Bambino	"El Amor"	Don Omar – "Virtual Diva"; Shakira – "Loba"; Wisin & Yandel – "Me Estás Tentando"	
2011	Shakira featuring Freshlyground	"Waka Waka (This Time for Africa)"	Chino & Nacho – "Mi Niña Bonita"; Pitbull – "Bon, Bon"; Shakira featuring El Cata – "Loca"	
2012	Don Omar featuring Lucenzo	"Danza Kuduro"	Pitbull – "Bon, Bon"; Shakira featuring El Cata – "Rabiosa"; Shakira featuring Freshlyground – "Waka Waka (This Time for Africa)"	
2013	Don Omar featuring Lucenzo	"Danza Kuduro"	Don Omar featuring Natti Natasha – "Dutty Love"; Romeo Santos featuring Usher – "Promise"; Michel Telo – "Ai Se Eu Te Pego"	
2014	Marc Anthony	"Vivir Mi Vida"	Daddy Yankee – "Limbo"; Prince Royce – "Darte Un Beso"; Romeo Santos – "Propuesta Indecente"	
2015	Enrique Iglesias featuring Descemer Bueno and Gente de Zona	"Bailando"	J Balvin featuring Farruko – "6 AM"; Enrique Iglesias featuring Marco Antonio Solís – "El Perdedor"; Romeo Santos featuring Drake – "Odio"	
2016	Nicky Jam and Enrique Iglesias	"El Perdón"	Gente de Zona featuring Marc Anthony – "La Gozadera"; J Balvin – "Ay Vamos"; J Balvin – "Ginza"	
2017	Nicky Jam	"Hasta El Amanecer"	Carlos Vives and Shakira – "La Bicicleta"; Enrique Iglesias featuring Wisin – "Duele El Corazón"; Pitbull featuring Sensato, Lil Jon, and Osmani García – "El Taxi"	
2018	Luis Fonsi and Daddy Yankee featuring Justin Bieber	"Despacito"	J Balvin and Willy William featuring Beyoncé – "Mi Gente"; Maluma – "Felices Los 4"; Shakira featuring Maluma – "Chantaje"	
2019	Daddy Yankee	"Dura"	Casper Mágico, Nio García, Darell, Nicky Jam, Ozuna, and Bad Bunny – "Te Boté"; DJ Snake featuring Selena Gomez, Ozuna, and Cardi B – "Taki Taki"; Nicky Jam and J Balvin – "X"	
2020	Daddy Yankee	"Con Calma" (featuring Snow)	Bad Bunny and Tainy - "Callaíta"; Ozuna featuring Daddy Yankee, Farruko, J Balvin & Anuel AA - "Baila Baila Baila (Remix)"; Pedro Capó and Farruko - "Calma (Remix)"	

== Records ==
=== Most nominations ===
Nominations	Act
7	Shakira
6	J Balvin
4	Don Omar
4	Daddy Yankee
4	Enrique Iglesias
4	Nicky Jam
3	Pitbull
3	Romeo Santos
3	Ozuna
3	Farruko
2	El Cata
2	Freshlyground
2	Gente de Zona
2	Lucenzo
2	Maluma
2	Marc Anthony
2	Bad Bunny

=== Most awards ===
Awards	Act
3	Daddy Yankee
2	Don Omar
2	Enrique Iglesias
2	Nicky Jam
