= Billboard Latin Music Award for Producer of the Year =

Annual music award

- Current: 2023 Billboard Latin Music Awards
- Awarded for: the best performing producers in Billboard magazine
- Country: United States
- Presented by: Billboard
- First award: 1996
- Final award: 2023
- Currently held by: Edgar Barrera (2023)

Highlights
- Most awards: Rudy Pérez (4)
- Most nominations: Rudy Pérez and Fernando Camacho Tirado (5)
- Website: billboardevents.com

The Billboard Latin Music Award for Producer of the Year is an honor presented annually at the Billboard Latin Music Awards. A ceremony which honors "the most popular albums, songs, and performers in Latin music, as determined by the actual sales, radio airplay, streaming and social data that informs Billboard's weekly charts." The award is given to the best performing producers on Billboard's Latin charts.

== Recipients ==
| Year | Producer | Nominees | Ref. |
|---|---|---|---|
| 1996 | Marco Antonio Solís | Nominations were not provided prior to 1999. | |
| 1997 | Marco Antonio Solís | Nominations were not provided prior to 1999. | |
| 1998 | No award | | |
| 1999 | Emilio Estefan, Jr. | Nominations were not provided prior to 1999. | |
| 2000 | Pedro Ramírez | Rudy Pérez; Bebu Silvetti; Kike Santander | |
| 2001 | Rudy Pérez | Emilio Estefan, Jr.; Alejandro Jaén; Kike Santander | |
| 2002 | Bebu Silvetti | Alejandro Jaén; Pepe Aguilar; Jesús Guillén | |
| 2003 | Rudy Pérez | Aureo Baqueiro; Bebu Silvetti; René Luis Toledo | |
| 2004 | Rudy Pérez | Jesús Guillén; Kike Santander; Tommy Torres | |
| 2005 | Rudy Pérez | Aureo Baqueiro; Estefano; José Luis Terrazas | |
| 2006 | Luny Tunes | Armando Ávila; Jesús Guillén; Eliel Lind | |
| 2007 | Luny Tunes | Armando Ávila; Cachorro López; Nely | |
| 2008 | Juan Luis Guerra | Jesús Guillén; Marco Antonio Solís; Ernesto Pérez Zagaste | |
| 2009 | Armando Ávila | Irving Dominguez; Fher Olvera; Joan Sebastian | |
| 2010 | Armando Ávila | Fernando Camacho Tirado; Cachorro López; Tito El Bambino | |
| 2011 | Fernando Camacho Tirado | Alfonso Lizarraga; Carlos Paucar; Joel Lizarraga | |
| 2012 | A&X | Julión Álvarez; Sergio George; Fernando Camacho Tirado | |
| 2013 | Fernando Camacho Tirado | Jesús Tirado Castañeda; Sergio George; Gerardo Ortíz | |
| 2014 | Romeo Santos | Fernando Camacho Tirado; Sergio George; Jesús Tirado Castañeda | |
| 2015 | Romeo Santos | Jesús Tirado Castañeda; Carlos Paucar; Sky | |
| 2016 | Saga Whiteblack | Romeo Santos; Jesús Jaime Gonzalez Terrazas; Jesús Tirado Castañeda | |
| 2017 | Saga Whiteblack | Sky; Jesús Jaime Gonzalez Terrazas; Sergio Lizarraga | |
| 2018 | Mauricio Rengifo and Andres Torres | Chris Jeday; Saga Whiteblack; Wisin | |
| 2019 | Chris Jeday | Andrés Torres and Mauricio Rengifo; DJ Snake; José Martín Velázquez | |
| 2020 | Tainy | Dímelo Flow; DJ Snake; Mambo Kingz | |
| 2021 | Tainy | Mora; Ovy on the Drums; Sky Rompiendo; Súbelo Neo | |
| 2022 | Tainy | Jimmy Humilde; Marco "MAG" Borrero; Ovy on the Drums; Súbelo Neo | |
| 2023 | Edgar Barrera | Ernesto Fernández; Jimmy Humilde; Marco "MAG" Borrero; Ovy on the Drums | |

== Records ==
=== Most nominations ===
| Nominations | Producer |
|---|---|
| 5 | Fernando Camacho Tirado |
| 5 | Rudy Pérez |
| 4 | Armando Ávila |
| 4 | Jesús Tirado Castañeda |
| 4 | Jesús Guillén |
| 3 | Bebu Silvetti |
| 3 | Kike Santander |
| 3 | Marco Antonio Solís |
| 3 | Romeo Santos |
| 3 | Sergio George |
| 3 | Sky Rompiendo |
| 3 | Saga Whiteblack |
| 3 | Tainy |
| 3 | Ovy on the Drums |
| 2 | Alejandro Jaén |
| 2 | Andrés Torres & Mauricio Rengifo |
| 2 | Aureo Baqueiro |
| 2 | Cachorro López |
| 2 | Carlos Paucar |
| 2 | Chris Jeday |
| 2 | Emilio Estefan, Jr. |
| 2 | Jesús Jaime Gonzalez Terrazas |
| 2 | Luny Tunes |
| 2 | DJ Snake |
| 2 | Súbelo Neo |
| 2 | Jimmy Humilde |
| 2 | Marco "MAG" Borrero |

=== Most awards ===
| Awards | Producer |
|---|---|
| 4 | Rudy Pérez |
| 3 | Tainy |
| 2 | Armando Ávila |
| 2 | Fernando Camacho Tirado |
| 2 | Luny Tunes |
| 2 | Marco Antonio Solís |
| 2 | Romeo Santos |
| 2 | Saga Whiteblack |

== See also ==
- Latin Grammy Award for Producer of the Year
