= Billboard Latin Music Award for Hot Latin Song of the Year =

Annual American music award

- Current: 2025 Billboard Latin Music Awards
- Awarded for: the best performing Latin songs on Billboard charts
- Country: United States
- Presented by: Billboard
- First award: 1994
- Final award: 2025
- Currently held by: "DTMF" by Bad Bunny

Highlights
- Most awards: Bad Bunny (3); Enrique Iglesias (3); Nicky Jam (3)
- Most nominations: Bad Bunny (12)
- Website: billboardevents.com

The Billboard Latin Music Award for Hot Latin Song of the Year (formerly Hot Latin Track of the Year) is an honor presented annually at the Billboard Latin Music Awards, a ceremony which honors "the most popular albums, songs, and performers in Latin music, as determined by the actual sales, radio airplay, online streaming and social data that informs Billboard's weekly charts." The award is given to the best performing singles on Billboard's Hot Latin Songs chart, which measures the most popular Latin recordings in the United States. The Hot Latin Songs chart was established by the magazine in September 1986 and was originally based on airplay on Latin music radio stations. Since October 2012, chart rankings are based on digital sales, radio airplay, and online streaming. From 1995 to 1998, each music genre's field (pop, tropical/salsa and Regional Mexican) had their own Hot Latin Track of the Year category.

Bad Bunny, Enrique Iglesias, and Nicky Jam are the most awarded artists in the category with three wins each. With 12 nominations, Bad Bunny is the most nominated artist. He is also the first and only artist to have three and four nominated songs in the same year. Enrique Iglesias and Nicky Jam are the only artists to win twice in a row. Alejandro Fernández, Wisin & Yandel, Don Omar, Romeo Santos, Ozuna, Nicky Jam, Peso Pluma, and Grupo Frontera are the only acts with two nominated songs in the same year, a milestone achieved twice by Santos. As of 2025, the holder is "DTMF" by Bad Bunny.

== Recipients ==
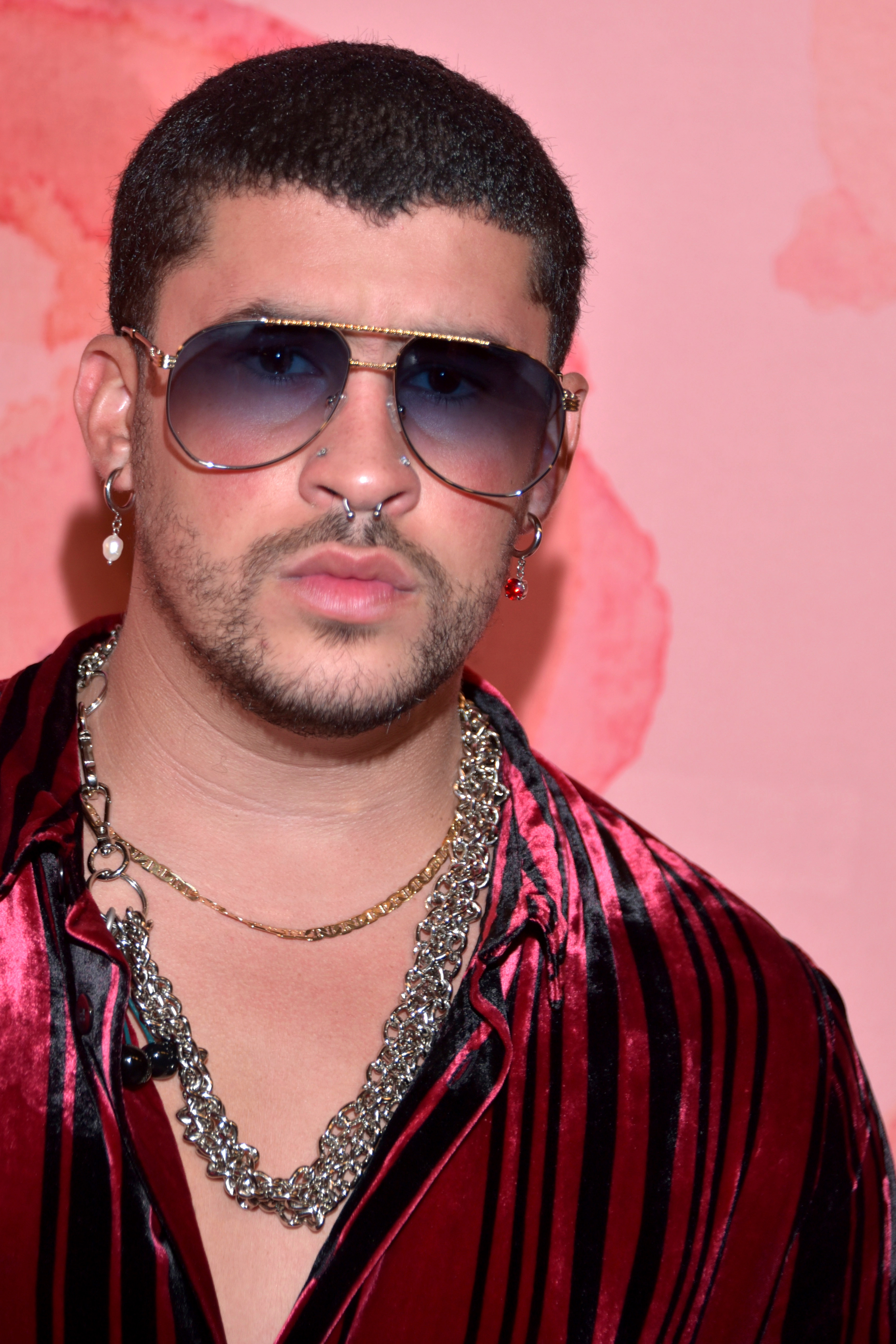
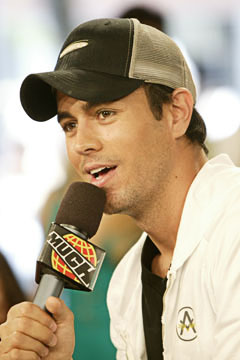

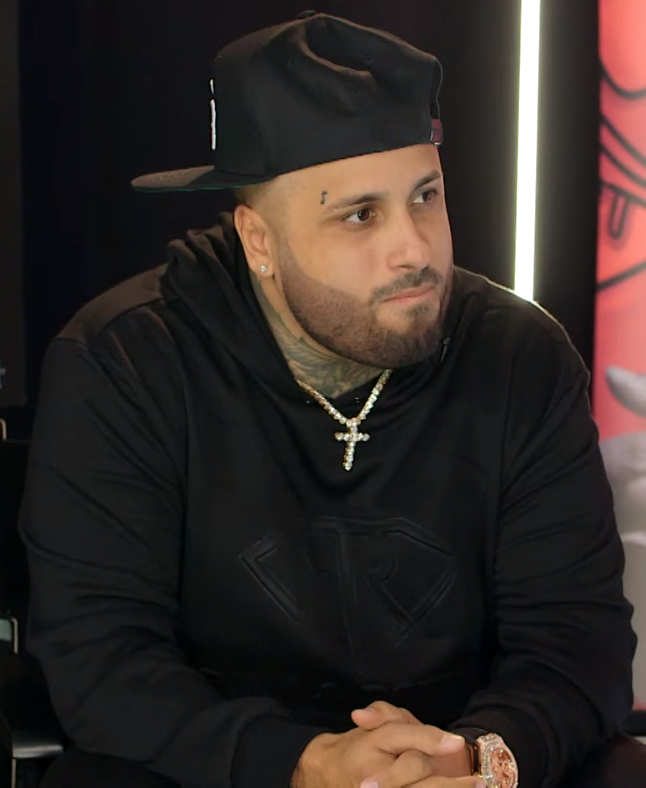
Three-time winners Bad Bunny (top), Enrique Iglesias (middle), and Nicky Jam (bottom)

Year	Performing artist(s)	Work	Nominees	Ref.
1994	La Mafia	"Me Estoy Enamorando"	Nominations were not provided prior to 1999.	
1995	During this period, the Hot Latin Track of the Year category was part of each genre's respective field (pop, tropical/salsa, and Regional Mexican)			
1996	During this period, the Hot Latin Track of the Year category was part of each genre's respective field (pop, tropical/salsa, and Regional Mexican)			
1997	During this period, the Hot Latin Track of the Year category was part of each genre's respective field (pop, tropical/salsa, and Regional Mexican)			
1998	During this period, the Hot Latin Track of the Year category was part of each genre's respective field (pop, tropical/salsa, and Regional Mexican)			
1999	Pepe Aguilar	"Por Mujeres Como Tú"	Ricky Martin – "Vuelve"; Alejandro Fernández – "Yo Nací Para Amarte"; Alejandro Fernández – "No Sé Olvidar"	
2000	Alejandro Fernández	"Loco"	Jennifer Lopez and Marc Anthony – "No Me Ames"; Ricky Martin – "Livin' la Vida Loca"; Marco Antonio Solís – "Si Te Pudiera Mentir"	
2001	Son by Four	"A Puro Dolor"	Marc Anthony – "Muy Dentro de Mí"; Gilberto Santa Rosa – "Que Alguien Me Diga"; Joan Sebastian – "Secreto de Amor"	
2002	Juan Gabriel	"Abrázame Muy Fuerte"	Marco Antonio Solís – "O Me Voy O Te Vas"; Jaci Velasquez – "Cómo Se Cura Una Herida"; Palomo – "No Me Conoces Aún"	
2003	Chayanne	"Y Tú Te Vas"	Pilar Montenegro – "Quítame Ese Hombre"; Jennifer Peña – "El Dolor de Tu Presencia"; Sin Bandera – "Entra En Mi Vida"	
2004	Ricky Martin	"Tal Vez"	Obie Bermúdez – "Antes"; Chayanne – "Un Siglo Sin Ti"; Juanes and Nelly Furtado – "Fotografía"	
2005	Juanes	"Nada Valgo Sin Tu Amor"	Alejandro Fernández – "Me Dediqué a Perderte"; Paulina Rubio – "Te Quise Tanto"; Marco Antonio Solís – "Más Que Tu Amigo"	
2006	Shakira featuring Alejandro Sanz	"La Tortura"	Baby Ranks, Daddy Yankee, Tony Tun Tun, Wisin & Yandel, and Héctor el Father – "Mayor Que Yo"; Juanes – "La Camisa Negra"; Wisin & Yandel – "Rakata"	
2007	Mariano Barba	"Aliado del Tiempo"	Rakim & Ken-Y – "Down"; Joan Sebastian – "Más Allá del Sol"; Shakira featuring Wyclef Jean – "Hips Don't Lie"	
2008	Aventura	"Mi Corazoncito"	Casa de Leones – "No Te Veo"; Enrique Iglesias – "Dímelo"; Juanes – "Me Enamora"	
2009	Flex	"Te Quiero"	Luis Fonsi – "No Me Doy por Vencido"; Enrique Iglesias – "¿Dónde Están Corazón?"; Maná – "Si No Te Hubieras Ido"	
2010	Tito El Bambino	"El Amor"	Banda el Recodo – "Te Presumo"; La Arrolladora Banda El Limón – "Ya Es Muy Tarde"; Espinoza Paz – "Lo Intentamos"	
2011	Enrique Iglesias featuring Juan Luis Guerra	"Cuando Me Enamoro"	Banda el Recodo – "Dime Que Me Quieres"; La Arrolladora Banda El Limón – "Niña De Mi Corazón"; La Original Banda El Limón – "Al Menos"	
2012	Don Omar	"Taboo"	Don Omar and Lucenzo – "Danza Kuduro"; Pitbull featuring Ne-Yo, Afrojack, and Nayer – "Give Me Everything"; Prince Royce – "Corazón Sin Cara"	
2013	Michel Telo	"Ai Se Eu Te Pego"	3Ball MTY featuring El Bebeto and América Sierra – "Inténtalo"; Juan Magán featuring Pitbull and El Cata – "Bailando Por El Mundo"; Don Omar featuring Natti Natasha – "Dutty Love"	
2014	Marc Anthony	"Vivir Mi Vida"	Enrique Iglesias featuring Romeo Santos – "Loco"; Prince Royce – "Darte un Beso"; Romeo Santos – "Propuesta Indecente"	
2015	Enrique Iglesias featuring Descemer Bueno and Gente de Zona	"Bailando"	J Balvin featuring Farruko – "6 AM"; Romeo Santos – "Eres Mía"; Romeo Santos featuring Drake – "Odio"	
2016	Nicky Jam and Enrique Iglesias	"El Perdón"	Los Plebes del Rancho de Ariel Camacho – "Te Metiste"; J Balvin – "Ginza"; Romeo Santos – "Propuesta Indecente"	
2017	Nicky Jam	"Hasta el Amanecer"	Carlos Vives and Shakira – "La Bicicleta"; Daddy Yankee – "Shaky Shaky"; Enrique Iglesias featuring Wisin – "Duele El Corazón"	
2018	Luis Fonsi and Daddy Yankee featuring Justin Bieber	"Despacito"	J Balvin and Willy William featuring Beyoncé – "Mi Gente"; Maluma – "Felices Los 4"; Wisin featuring Ozuna – "Escápate Conmigo"	
2019	Casper Mágico, Nio García, Darell, Nicky Jam, Ozuna, and Bad Bunny	"Te Boté"	Daddy Yankee – "Dura"; DJ Snake featuring Selena Gomez, Ozuna, and Cardi B – "Taki Taki"; Nicky Jam and J Balvin – "X"	
2020	Daddy Yankee featuring Snow	"Con Calma"	Bad Bunny and Tainy – "Callaíta"; Pedro Capó and Farruko – "Calma"; Sech, Darell, Nicky Jam, Ozuna, and Anuel AA – "Otro Trago"	
2021	Bad Bunny and Jhay Cortez	"Dakiti"	Black Eyed Peas and J Balvin – "Ritmo (Bad Boys For Life)"; Kali Uchis – "Telepatía"; Karol G and Nicki Minaj – "Tusa"; Maluma and The Weeknd – "Hawái"	
2022	Farruko	"Pepas"	Bad Bunny and Chencho Corleone - "Me Porto Bonito"; Bad Bunny - "Tití Me Preguntó"; Bad Bunny - "Yonaguni"; Becky G and Karol G - "Mamiii"	
2023	Eslabon Armado and Peso Pluma	"Ella Baila Sola"	Fuerza Regida and Grupo Frontera - "Bebe Dame"; Grupo Frontera and Bad Bunny - "Un x100to"; Karol G and Shakira - "TQG"; Yng Lvcas and Peso Pluma - "La Bebe"	
2024	Karol G and Peso Pluma	"Qlona"	Bad Bunny - "Monaco"; Bad Bunny and Feid - "Perro Negro"; FloyyMenor and Cris MJ - "Gata Only"; Xavi - "La Diabla"	
2025	Bad Bunny	"DTMF"	Bad Bunny - "Baile Inolvidable"; Bad Bunny - "Eoo"; Bad Bunny - "Nuevayol"; Óscar Maydon & Fuerza Regida - "Tu Boda"	

== Records ==
=== Most nominations ===
Nominations	Act
12	Bad Bunny
7	Enrique Iglesias
5	Daddy Yankee
5	Nicky Jam
5	Romeo Santos
5	J Balvin
4	Alejandro Fernández
4	Juanes
4	Ozuna
4	Karol G
4	Shakira
3	Don Omar
3	Marc Anthony
3	Marco Antonio Solís
3	Ricky Martin
3	Farruko
3	Peso Pluma
2
2	Chayanne
2	Joan Sebastian
2	Luis Fonsi
2	Pitbull
2	Prince Royce
2	Wisin
2	Wisin & Yandel
2	Maluma

=== Most wins ===
Awards	Act
3	Bad Bunny
3	Enrique Iglesias
3	Nicky Jam
2	Daddy Yankee
2	Peso Pluma

== See also ==
- Billboard Music Award for Top Latin Song
- Latin Grammy Award for Record of the Year
- Latin Grammy Award for Song of the Year
