= Billboard Latin Music Award for Songwriter of the Year =

Annual American music award

- Current: 2023 Billboard Latin Music Awards
- Awarded for: the best performing songwriters in Billboard magazine
- Country: United States
- Presented by: Billboard
- First award: 1996
- Final award: 2023
- Currently held by: Peso Pluma (2023)

Highlights
- Most awards: Marco Antonio Solís (5)
- Most nominations: Marco Antonio Solís (10)
- Website: billboardevents.com

The Billboard Latin Music Award for Songwriter of the Year is an honor presented annually at the Billboard Latin Music Awards, a ceremony which honors "the most popular albums, songs, and performers in Latin music, as determined by the actual sales, radio airplay, streaming and social data that informs Billboard's weekly charts." The award is given to the best performing songwriters on Billboard's Latin charts.

Marco Antonio Solís is the most awarded songwriter in the category with five wins out of ten nominations, followed by Espinoza Paz and Romeo Santos with four awards each from six and seven nominations, respectively. As of 2023, only Marco Antonio Solís, Espinoza Paz, Romeo Santos and Bad Bunny have won Songwriter of the Year thrice in a row. The current holder as of the 2023 ceremony is Peso Pluma.

== Recipients ==
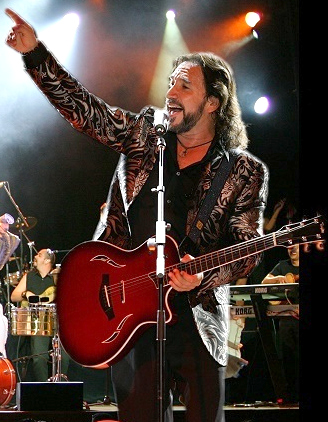
Five-time winner Marco Antonio Solís

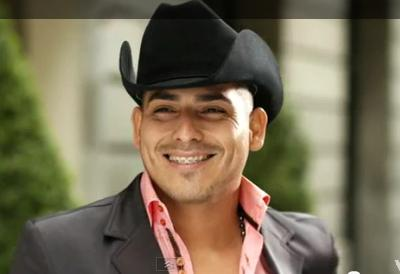

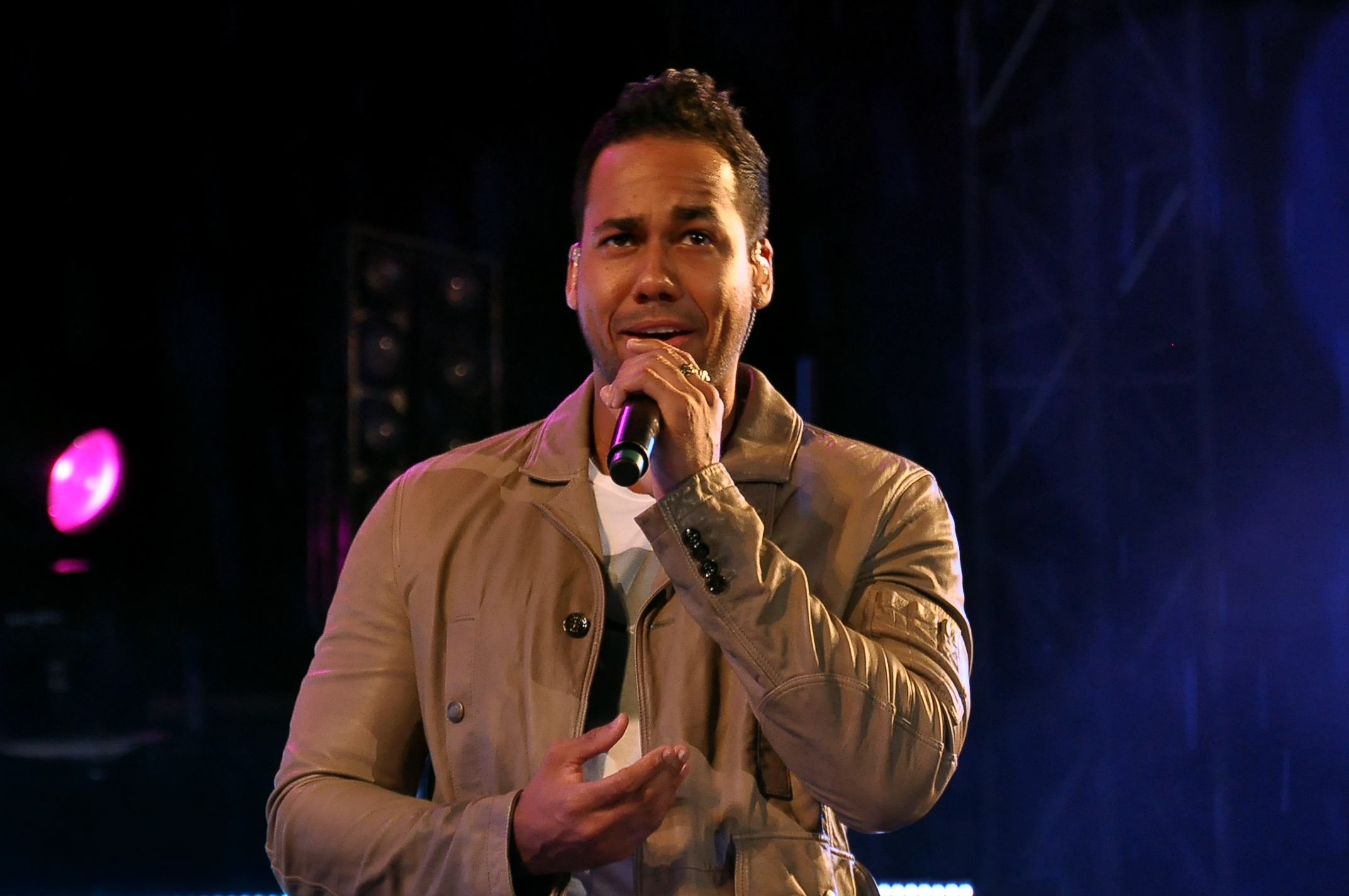
Four-time winners Espinoza Paz (above) and Romeo Santos (below)

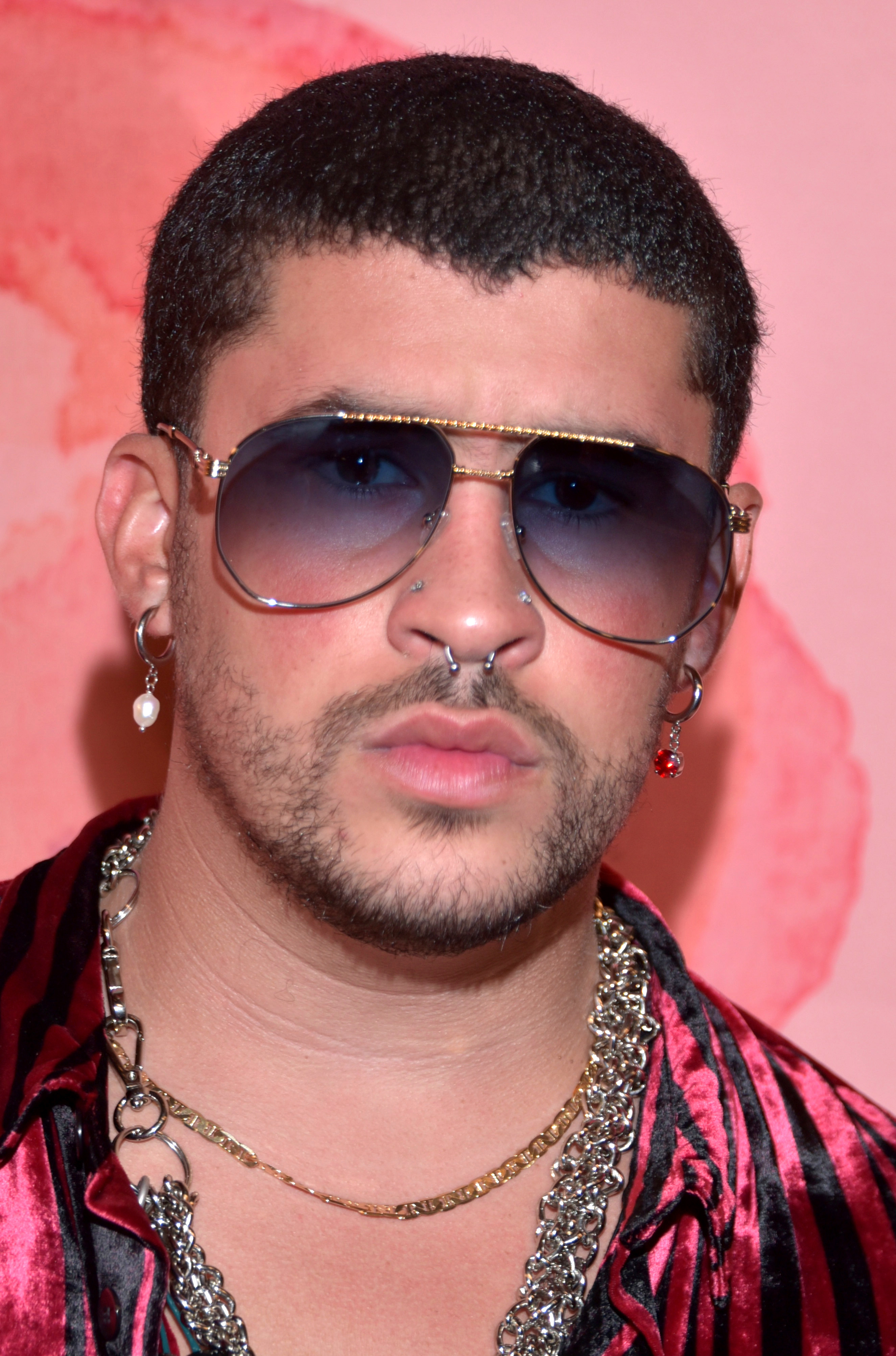
Three-time winner Bad Bunny

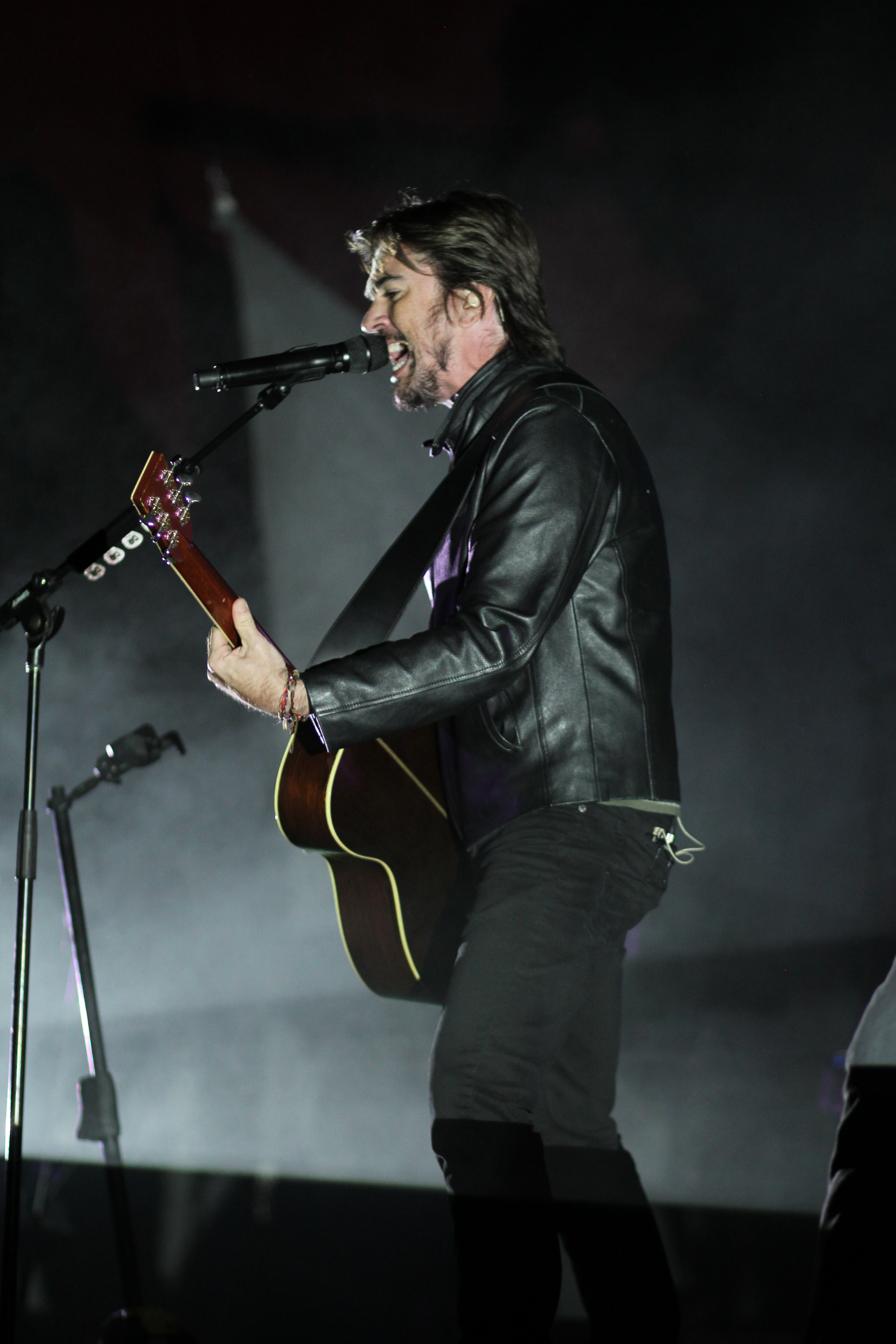
Two-time winner Juanes

Year	Recipient	Nominees	Ref.
1996	Marco Antonio Solís	Nominations were not present prior to 1999	
1997	Marco Antonio Solís	Nominations were not present prior to 1999	
1998	Marco Antonio Solís	Nominations were not present prior to 1999	
1999	No award		
2000	Marco Antonio Solís	Kike Santander; Juan Gabriel; Rudy Pérez	
2001	Omar Alfanno	Estéfano; Rudy Pérez; Kike Santander	
2002	Juan Gabriel	Marco Antonio Solís; Omar Alfanno; Estéfano	
2003	Estéfano	Franco de Vita; Juanes; Rudy Pérez	
2004	Juanes	Franco de Vita; Juan Gabriel; Marco Antonio Solís	
2005	Leonel García	Fato; Rudy Pérez; Marco Antonio Solís	
2006	Juanes	Daddy Yankee; Juan Gabriel; Don Omar	
2007	Romeo Santos	Mariano Barba; Joan Sebastian; Marco Antonio Solís	
2008	Marco Antonio Solís	Juan Luis Guerra; Romeo Santos; Joan Sebastian	
2009	Espinoza Paz	Juanes; Joan Sebastian; Marco Antonio Solís	
2010	Espinoza Paz	Horacio Palencia; Romeo Santos; Joan Sebastian	
2011	Espinoza Paz	Romeo Santos; Horacio Palencia; Daddy Yankee	
2012	Prince Royce	Horacio Palencia; Espinoza Paz; Fher Olvera	
2013	Espinoza Paz	Horacio Palencia; Don Omar; Gerardo Ortíz	
2014	Romeo Santos	Luciano Luna; Espinoza Paz; Gerardo Ortíz	
2015	Romeo Santos	J Balvin; Horacio Palencia; Luciano Luna	
2016	Romeo Santos	Horacio Palencia; Nicky Jam; Sergio Mercado	
2017	Horacio Palencia	Edén Muñóz; Luciano Luna; Daddy Yankee	
2018	Daddy Yankee	Justin Bieber; Erika Ender; Luis Fonsi; Marty James; Poo Bear	
2019	Juan "Gaby Music" Rivera	Daddy Yankee; J Balvin; Ozuna	
2020	Bad Bunny	Daddy Yankee; J Balvin; Ozuna	
2021	Bad Bunny	Anuel AA; Edgar Barrera; J Balvin; Tainy	
2022	Bad Bunny	Edgar Barrera; Marco Barrera; Roberto Rosario; Tainy	
2023	Peso Pluma	Bad Bunny; Edgar Barrera; Marco Barrera; Pedro Tovar	

== Records ==
=== Most nominations ===
Nominations	Recipient
10	Marco Antonio Solís
7	Horacio Palencia
7	Romeo Santos
6	Espinoza Paz
6	Daddy Yankee
4	Joan Sebastian
4	Juan Gabriel
4	Juanes
4	Rudy Pérez
4	J Balvin
4	Bad Bunny
3	Estéfano
3	Luciano Luna
3	Edgar Barrera
2	Don Omar
2	Franco de Vita
2	Gerardo Ortíz
2	Kike Santander
2	Omar Alfanno
2	Ozuna
2	Tainy
2	Marco Barrera

=== Most awards ===
Awards	Producer
5	Marco Antonio Solís
4	Espinoza Paz
4	Romeo Santos
3	Bad Bunny
2	Juanes
