= 2019 Billboard Latin Music Awards =

Annual American music awards ceremony

26th Billboard Latin Music Awards
- Date: April 25, 2019
- Site: Mandalay Bay Events Center; Las Vegas, Nevada, U.S.
- Hosted by: Gaby Espino

Highlights
- Most awards: Ozuna (11)
- Most nominations: Ozuna (23)

Television coverage
- Network: Telemundo

The 26th Billboard Latin Music Awards ceremony, presented by Billboard magazine, honored the best performing Latin recordings of 2018 and took place on April 25, 2019 at the Mandalay Bay Events Center in Las Vegas. Billboard presented awards in 59 categories. The ceremony was televised in the United States by Telemundo for the 21st time, and was the culmination of the Billboard Latin Music Conference. The awards recognize the most popular Latin performers, songs, albums, labels, songwriters and producers in the United States. Recipients were based on sales, radio airplay, online streaming and social data during a one-year period.

Venezuelan actress, model and presenter Gaby Espino hosted the ceremony. Throughout the show, Espino was joined by Bad Bunny, Carlos Vives, Mark Tacher and Luis Fonsi as co-hosts.

Ozuna led the list of nominations for the 2019 Billboard Latin Music Awards, with 23 nods in 15 categories — a record number in the history of the awards. Ozuna was the biggest winner of the night, with eleven awards.

== Performers ==
Artist(s)	Song(s)
Wisin & Yandel Ft. Romeo Santos	"Aullando"
Marc Anthony	"Parecen Viernes"
Adriel Favela Ft. Javier Rosas y Su Artilleria Pesada	"La Escuela No Me Gustó"
Sebastián Yatra & Reik	"Un Año"
Anitta & Becky G	"Banana"
J Balvin; Rosalía; El Guincho; Sean Paul	"Con Altura" "Contra La Pared"
Nicky Jam & Ozuna	"Te Robaré"
Banda MS	"El Color de Tus Ojos" "Por Siempre Mi Amor"
CNCO	"Pretend"
Romeo Santos; Raulin Rodriguez; Aventura	"La Demanda" "Inmortal"
Bad Bunny & Diplo	"200 MPH" "Tenemos Que Hablar"
Luis Fonsi, Nicky Jam & Sebastián Yatra	"Date La Vuelta"
Kany García, Pedro Capó & Fonseca	Tribute to Juan Luis Guerra "Burbujas de Amor" "Ojalá Que Llueva Café" "La Travesía"
Anuel AA; Karol G	"Culpables" & "Secreto"
Ozuna, DJ Snake, Daddy Yankee Ft. J Balvin & Anuel AA	"Taki Taki" "Baila Baila Baila (Remix)"
Carlos Vives & Wisin	"Si Me Das Tu Amor"

== Presenters ==
- Gaby Espino and Bad Bunny – presented Duo/Group Hot Latin Songs Artist of the Year
- Erick Elías and Betty Torres – presented Airplay Song of the Year
- Kany García and Jorge Salinas – presented Latin Rhythm Artist of the Year
- Ana María Polo and Lupillo Rivera – presented New Artist of the Year
- Isabela Moner and Eugenio Derbez – presented Tropical Song of the Year
- Luis Fonsi – presented Latin Pop Duo/Group of the Year
- ChocQuibTown – presented Regional Mexican Duo/Artist of the Year
- Pedro Capó – presented Digital Song of the Year
- Gente de Zona – presented Female Hot Latin Songs Artist of the Year
- Lali and Fonseca – presented Regional Mexican Song of the Year
- Leila Cobo and Regulo Caro – presented Latin Pop Song of the Year
- Juanes – presented Lifetime achievement award
- Sebastián Yatra – presented Tropical Duo/Group of the Year
- Becky G and Raymix – presented Social Artist of the Year
- Sofía Reyes – presented Tropical Artist of the Year

== Billboard Lifetime achievement award ==
- Juan Luis Guerra

== Winners and nominees ==
The nominees for the 26th Billboard Latin Music Awards were announced on February 12, 2019 J Balvin and Shakira led the nominations with 12 each. Ozuna leads the list of nominations with 23 nods in 15 categories — a record number in the history of the awards. He is followed in number of finalist slots by J Balvin and Nicky Jam, with 13 each, Bad Bunny with 12, and Daddy Yankee with 8.

Complete list of winners

=== Awards ===
Artist of the Year	New Artist of the Year
Ozuna; Bad Bunny; Daddy Yankee; J Balvin	Anuel AA; Karol G; Natti Natasha; Raymix
Tour of the Year	Social Artist of the Year
Luis Miguel; Jennifer Lopez; Romeo Santos; Shakira	Bad Bunny; Anitta; Anuel AA; Lali
Crossover Artist of the Year	Hot Latin Song of the Year
Cardi B; Demi Lovato; DJ Snake; Drake	Casper Mágico, Nio García and Bad Bunny feat. Darell, Nicky Jam & Ozuna – Te Boté (Remix); Daddy Yankee – Dura; DJ Snake feat. Selena Gomez, Ozuna & Cardi B – Taki Taki; Nicky Jam feat. J Balvin – X
Vocal Event Hot Latin Song of the Year	Male Hot Latin Songs Artist of the Year
Casper Mágico, Nio García and Bad Bunny feat. Darell, Nicky Jam & Ozuna – Te Boté (Remix); Bad Bunny feat. Drake – Mia; DJ Snake feat. Selena Gomez, Ozuna & Cardi B – Taki Taki; Nicky Jam feat. J Balvin – X	Ozuna; Bad Bunny; Daddy Yankee; J Balvin
Female Hot Latin Songs Artist of the Year	Duo/Group Hot Latin Songs Artist of the Year
Natti Natasha; Becky G; Jennifer Lopez; Karol G	Banda MS; Calibre 50; T3r Elemento; Zion & Lennox
Hot Latin Songs Label of the Year	Hot Latin Songs Imprint of the Year
Sony Music Latin; Flow La Movie; Universal Music Latin Entertainment; Warner Music Latina	Sony Music Latin; El Cartel Records; La Industria; Universal Music Latino
Airplay Song of the Year	Airplay Label of the Year
Nicky Jam feat. J Balvin – X; Casper Mágico, Nio García and Bad Bunny feat. Darell, Nicky Jam & Ozuna – Te Boté (Remix); Daddy Yankee – Dura; Reik feat. Ozuna & Wisin – Me niego	Sony Music Latin; Flow La Movie; Universal Music Latin Entertainment; Warner Music Latina
Airplay Imprint of the Year	Digital Song of the Year
Sony Music Latin; Fonovisa Records; La Industria; Universal Music Latino	Daddy Yankee – Dura; Casper Mágico, Nio García and Bad Bunny feat. Darell, Nicky Jam & Ozuna – Te Boté (Remix); DJ Snake feat. Selena Gomez, Ozuna & Cardi B – Taki Taki; Nicky Jam feat. J Balvin – X
Streaming Song of the Year	Top Latin Album of the Year
Casper Mágico, Nio García and Bad Bunny feat. Darell, Nicky Jam & Ozuna – Te Boté (Remix); Daddy Yankee – Dura; Nicky Jam feat. J Balvin – X; Ozuna feat. Romeo Santos – El Farsante (Remix)	Ozuna – Odisea; Anuel AA – Real Hasta La Muerte; J Balvin – Vibras; Ozuna – Aura
Male Top Latin Albums Artist of the Year	Female Top Latin Albums Artist of the Year
Ozuna; J Balvin; Maluma; Romeo Santos	Shakira; Karol G; Mon Laferte; Rosalía
Duo/Group Top Latin Albums Artist of the Year	Top Latin Albums Label of the Year
Banda MS; Aventura; Los Plebes del Rancho de Ariel Camacho; T3r Elemento	Sony Music Latin; Glad Empire; Universal Music Latin Entertainment; Warner Music Latina
Top Latin Albums Imprint of the Year	Latin Pop Song of the Year
Sony Music Latin; DimeloVi; Universal Music Latino; VP Entertainment	Reik feat. Ozuna & Wisin – Me niego; Enrique Iglesias feat. Bad Bunny – El Baño; Luis Fonsi feat. Demi Lovato – Échame la Culpa; Shakira feat. Maluma – Clandestino
Latin Pop Artist of the Year	Latin Pop Duo/Group of the Year
Shakira; Enrique Iglesias; Marco Antonio Solís; Sebastián Yatra	CNCO; Maná; Piso 21; Reik
Latin Pop Airplay Label of the Year	Latin Pop Airplay Imprint of the Year
Sony Music Latin; Flow La Movie; Universal Music Latin Entertainment; Warner Music Latina	Sony Music Latin; La Industria; Universal Music Latino; Warner Music Latina
Latin Pop Album of the Year	Latin Pop Albums Label of the Year
CNCO – CNCO; Piso 21 – Ubuntu; Rosalía – El mal querer; Sebastián Yatra – Mantra	Sony Music Latin; Gateway Music; Universal Music Latin Entertainment; Warner Music Latina
Latin Pop Albums Imprint of the Year	Tropical Song of the Year
Sony Music Latin; Capitol Latin; Universal Music Latin Entertainment; Warner Music Latina	Romeo Santos feat. Ozuna – Sobredosis; Carlos Vives – Hoy Tengo Tiempo (Pinta Sensual); Romeo Santos – Centavito; Silvestre Dangond feat. Nicky Jam – Cásate Conmigo
Tropical Artist of the Year	Tropical Duo/Group of the Year
Romeo Santos; Carlos Vives; Marc Anthony; Prince Royce	Aventura; Buena Vista Social Club; Gente de Zona; La Sonora Dinamita
Tropical Songs Airplay Label of the Year	Tropical Songs Airplay Imprint of the Year
Sony Music Latin; LP; Universal Music Latin Entertainment; Warner Music Latina	Sony Music Latin; Kiyavi; Warner Music Latina; WK
Tropical Album of the Year	Tropical Albums Label of the Year
Victor Manuelle – 25/7; Gilberto Santa Rosa feat. Victor García & La Sonora Sanjuanera – En Buena Compañía; La Sonora Dinamita – Súper Éxitos Vol. 1; Orquesta Akokán – Orquesta Akokán Canta: José "Pepito" Gómez	Sony Music Latin; The Orchard; Universal Music Latin Entertainment; World Circuit
Tropical Albums Imprint of the Year	Regional Mexican Song of the Year
Sony Music Latin; Norte; The Orchard; Top Stop Music	Raymix – Oye Mujer; Banda MS – Mejor Me Alejo; Banda MS – Tu Postura; La Adictiva Banda San José de Mesillas – En Peligro de Extinción
Regional Mexican Artist of the Year	Regional Mexican Duo/Artist of the Year
Christian Nodal; El Fantasma; Gerardo Ortiz; Raymix	Banda MS; Calibre 50; Los Plebes del Rancho de Ariel Camacho; T3r Elemento
Regional Mexican Airplay Label of the Year	Regional Mexican Airplay Imprint of the Year
Universal Music Latin Entertainment; DEL; Lizos; Sony Music Latin	Fonovisa Records; DEL; Disa Records; Lizos
Regional Mexican Album of the Year	Regional Mexican Albums Label of the Year
Lenin Ramírez – Bendecido; Arsenal Efectivo – En La Fuga; Legado 7 – Pura Lumbre; Raymix – Oye Mujer	Universal Music Latin Entertainment; DEL; Lizos; Sony Music Latin
Regional Mexican Albums Imprint of the Year	Latin Rhythm Song of the Year
DEL; Disa Records; Fonovisa Records; Lizos	Nicky Jam feat. J Balvin – X; Casper Mágico, Nio García and Bad Bunny feat. Darell, Nicky Jam & Ozuna – Te Boté (Remix); Daddy Yankee – Dura; Reik feat. Ozuna & Wisin – Me niego
Latin Rhythm Artist of the Year	Latin Rhythm Duo/Group of the Year
Ozuna; Bad Bunny; J Balvin; Maluma	CNCO; Piso 21; Wisin & Yandel; Zion & Lennox
Latin Rhythm Airplay Label of the Year	Latin Rhythm Airplay Imprint of the Year
Sony Music Latin; Flow La Movie; Universal Music Latin Entertainment; Warner Music Latina	Sony Music Latin; La Industria; Universal Music Latino; Warner Music Latina
Latin Rhythm Album of the Year	Latin Rhythm Albums Label of the Year
Ozuna – Odisea; Anuel AA – Real Hasta La Muerte; J Balvin – Vibras; Ozuna – Aura	Sony Music Latin; Glad Empire; Rimas; Universal Music Latin Entertainment
Latin Rhythm Albums Imprint of the Year	Songwriter of the Year
DimeloVi; Sony Music Latin; Universal Music Latino; VP Entertainment	Juan Rivera Vazquez; Daddy Yankee; J Balvin; Ozuna
Publisher of the Year	Publishing Corporation of the Year
WB Music Corp. ASCAP; Ozuna Worldwide, BMI; Sony/ATV Discos Publishing LLC, ASCAP; Warner-Tamerlane Publishing Corp., BMI	Sony/ATV Music Publishing; Kobalt Music Group; Universal Music Group; Warner/Chappell Music
Producer of the Year
Chris Jedi; Andrés Torres and Mauricio Rengifo; DJ Snake; José Martin Velázquez

== Multiple nominations and awards ==
The following received multiple nominations:

Twenty-three:

- Ozuna

Thirteen:

- J Balvin
- Nicky Jam

Twelve:

- Bad Bunny

Eight:

- Daddy Yankee

Six:

- Cásper Mágico
- Darell
- Nio García

Five:

- Banda MS
- DJ Snake

Four

- Anuel AA
- Cardi B
- Raymix
- Reik
- Shakira

Three:

- CNCO
- Karol G
- Maluma
- Piso 21
- Selena Gomez
- T3R Elemento
- Wisin

Two:

- Aventura
- Calibre 50
- Carlos Vives
- Demi Lovato
- Drake
- Enrique Iglesias
- Jennifer Lopez
- La Sonora Dinamita
- Los Plebes del Rancho de Ariel Camacho
- Natti Natasha
- Rosalía
- Sebastián Yatra
- Zion & Lennox

The following received multiple awards:

Eleven:

- Ozuna

Five:

- Nicky Jam

Four

- Bad Bunny

Three:

- Banda MS
- Cásper Mágico
- CNCO
- Darell
- Nío García

Two:

- J Balvin
- Romeo Santos
- Shakira
