= 2018 Billboard Latin Music Awards =

Annual American music awards ceremony

25th Billboard Latin Music Awards
- Date: April 26, 2018
- Site: Mandalay Bay Events Center; Las Vegas, Nevada, U.S.
- Hosted by: Gaby Espino; Marco Antonio Regil

Highlights
- Most awards: Daddy Yankee (8)
- Most nominations: J Balvin and Shakira (12)

Television coverage
- Network: Telemundo

The 25th Billboard Latin Music Awards ceremony, presented by Billboard magazine, honored the best performing Latin recordings of 2017 and took place on April 26, 2018 at the Mandalay Bay Events Center in Las Vegas. Billboard presented awards in 60 categories. The ceremony was televised in the United States by Telemundo for the 20th time, and was the culmination of the Billboard Latin Music Conference, which also took place from April 23 to April 26, 2018. Actress Gaby Espino and television presenter Marco Antonio Regil hosted the show. Espino first presided over the 22nd Billboard Latin Music Awards held in 2015. The awards recognized the most popular Latin performers, songs, albums, labels, songwriters and producers in the United States. Recipients were based on sales, radio airplay, online streaming and social data during a one-year period from the issue dated February 4, 2017 through January 27, 2018.

Daddy Yankee won eight awards, including Hot Latin Song of the Year and Songwriter of the Year, mostly due to the single "Despacito", which won all its six nominations. Other winners were Luis Fonsi and Justin Bieber with seven awards each, and Shakira with five. Maná received the Lifetime Achievement Award.

== Winners and nominees ==
The nominees for the 25th Billboard Latin Music Awards were announced on February 7, 2018, at 9:03 a.m. EST (11:03 UTC). J Balvin and Shakira led the nominations with 12 each.

The winners were announced during the awards ceremony on April 26, 2018.

=== Awards ===
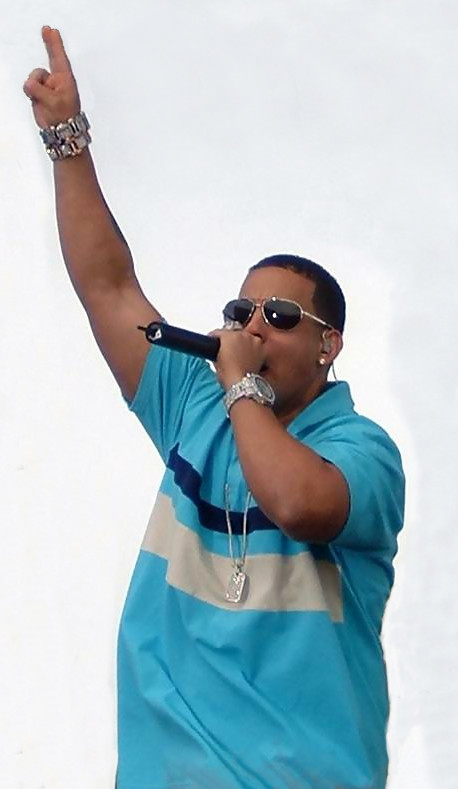
Daddy Yankee received eight awards, including Latin Rhythm Artist of the Year (Solo) and Songwriter of the Year, and other six for "Despacito".

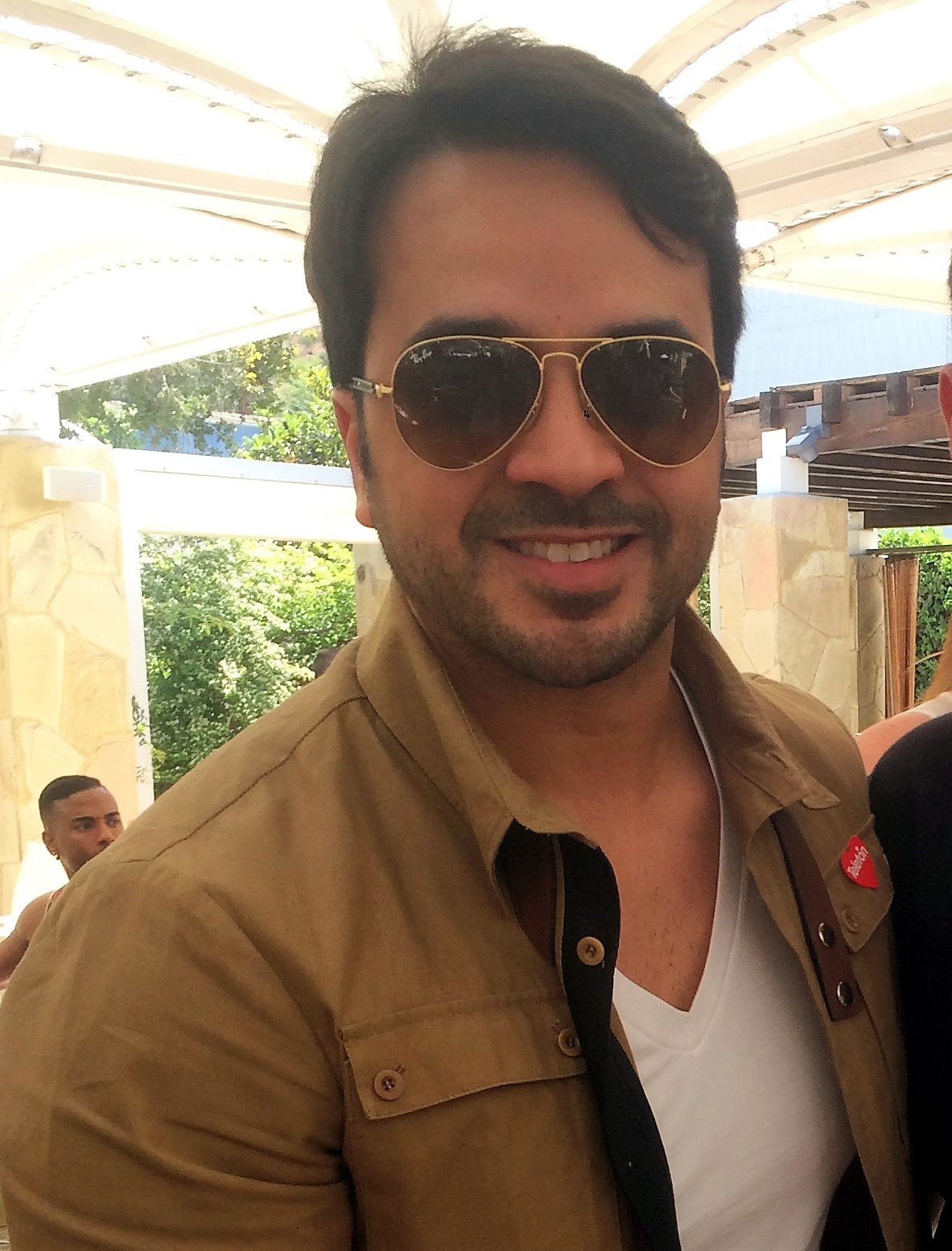

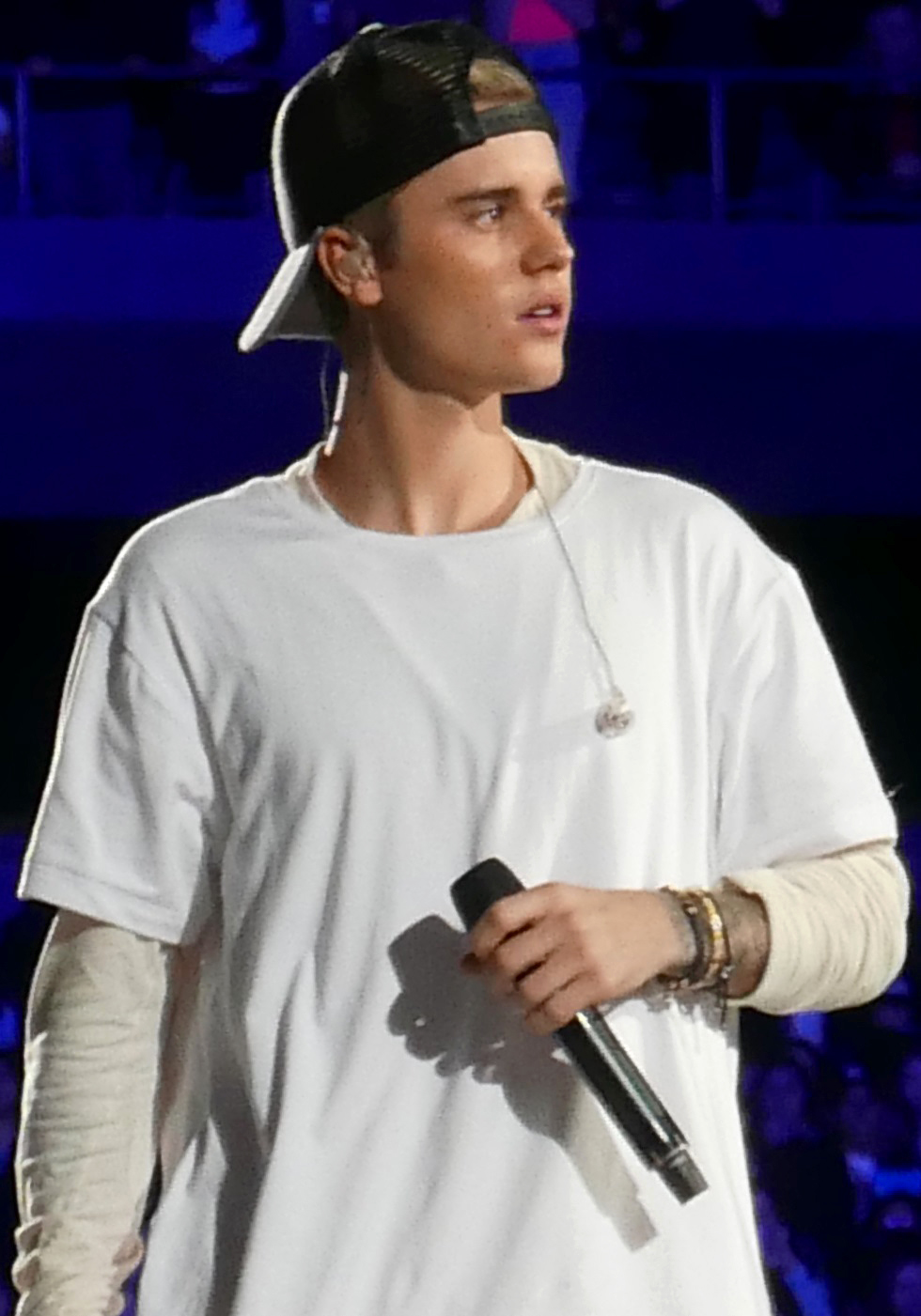
Luis Fonsi (top) and Justin Bieber (bottom) received seven awards each, including six for "Despacito". Fonsi also won Hot Latin Songs Artist of the Year (Male), while Bieber received Crossover Artist of the Year.

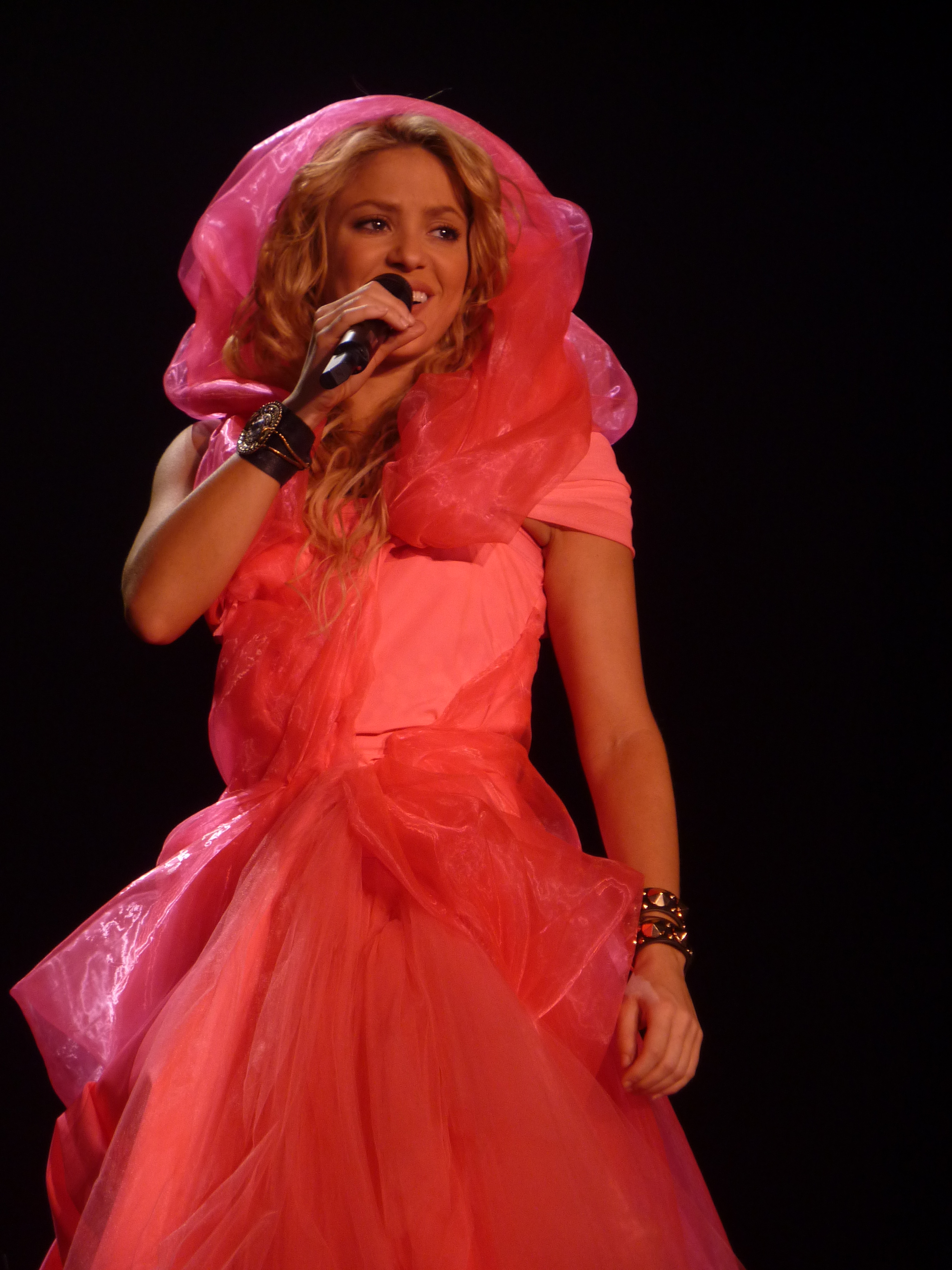
Shakira won five awards, including Hot Latin Songs Artist of the Year (Female) and Top Latin Albums Artist of the Year (Female).

Winners are listed first, highlighted in boldface.

**Artist of the Year**: **Ozuna**; J Balvin; Daddy Yankee; Luis Fonsi	**Artist of the Year – New**: **Christian Nodal**; Alta Consigna; Bad Bunny; El Fantasma y Banda Populares del Llano
**Tour of the Year**: **Enrique Iglesias and Pitbull**; Marc Anthony; Ricardo Arjona; Marco Antonio Solís	**Social Artist of the Year**: **Maluma**; J Balvin; Jennifer Lopez; Shakira
**Crossover Artist of the Year**: **Justin Bieber**; Beyoncé; Little Mix; Ed Sheeran	**Hot Latin Song of the Year**: **Luis Fonsi and Daddy Yankee featuring Justin Bieber – Despacito**; J Balvin and Willy William featuring Beyoncé – Mi Gente; Maluma – Felices los 4; Wisin featuring Ozuna – Escápate Conmigo
**Hot Latin Song of the Year – Vocal Event**: **Luis Fonsi and Daddy Yankee featuring Justin Bieber – Despacito**; J Balvin and Willy William featuring Beyoncé – Mi Gente; Shakira featuring Maluma – Chantaje; Wisin featuring Ozuna – Escápate Conmigo	**Hot Latin Songs Artist of the Year – Male**: **Luis Fonsi**; J Balvin; Daddy Yankee; Ozuna
**Hot Latin Songs Artist of the Year – Female**: **Shakira**; Becky G; Jennifer Lopez; Natti Natasha	**Hot Latin Songs Artist of the Year – Duo or Group**: **Calibre 50**; Banda Sinaloense MS; CNCO; Zion & Lennox
**Hot Latin Songs Label of the Year**: **Universal Music Latino**; Sony Music Latin; VP Entertainment; Warner Music Latina	**Hot Latin Songs Imprint of the Year**: **Sony Music Latin**; Def Jam; Raymond Braun; Schoolboy
**Airplay Song of the Year**: **Luis Fonsi and Daddy Yankee featuring Justin Bieber – Despacito**; J Balvin and Willy William featuring Beyoncé – Mi Gente; Maluma – Felices los 4; Wisin featuring Ozuna – Escápate Conmigo	**Airplay Label of the Year**: **Sony Music Latin**; DEL; Universal Music Latino; Warner Music Latina
**Airplay Imprint of the Year**: **Sony Music Latin**; Fonovisa Records; Universal Music Latino; WK	**Digital Song of the Year**: **Luis Fonsi and Daddy Yankee featuring Justin Bieber – Despacito**; J Balvin and Willy William featuring Beyoncé – Mi Gente; Maluma – Felices los 4; Shakira featuring Maluma – Chantaje
**Streaming Song of the Year**: **Luis Fonsi and Daddy Yankee featuring Justin Bieber – Despacito**; J Balvin and Willy William featuring Beyoncé – Mi Gente; Maluma – Felices los 4; Shakira featuring Maluma – Chantaje	**Top Latin Album of the Year**: **Nicky Jam – Fénix**; J Balvin – Energía; Ozuna – Odisea; Shakira – El Dorado
**Top Latin Compilation Album of the Year**: **Dance Latin #1 Hits 2.0: Los Éxitos del Momento**; Mexillennials: Los Éxitos De Una Nueva Generación; Summer Latin Hits 2017; Trap Capos: Season 1	**Top Latin Albums Artist of the Year – Male**: **Romeo Santos**; J Balvin; Nicky Jam; Ozuna
**Top Latin Albums Artist of the Year – Female**: **Shakira**; Alejandra Guzmán; Karol G; Gloria Trevi	**Top Latin Albums Artist of the Year – Duo or Group**: **Banda Sonaloense MS**; Calibre 50; CNCO; Los Plebes del Rancho
**Top Latin Albums Label of the Year**: **Sony Music Latin**; Lizos Music; Universal Music Latino; Warner Music Latina	**Top Latin Albums Imprint of the Year**: **Sony Music Latin**; Capitol Latin; DEL; Universal Music Latino
**Latin Pop Artist of the Year – Solo**: **Shakira**; Luis Fonsi; Enrique Iglesias; Juanes	**Latin Pop Artist of the Year – Duo or Group**: **CNCO**; Jesse & Joy; Maná; Reik
**Latin Pop Song of the Year**: **Luis Fonsi and Daddy Yankee featuring Justin Bieber – Despacito**; Enrique Iglesias featuring Descemer Bueno and Zion & Lennox – Súbeme La Radio; Shakira featuring Maluma – Chantaje; Shakira – Me Enamoré	**Latin Pop Airplay Label of the Year**: **Sony Music Latin**; Pina Records; Universal Music Latino; Warner Music Latina
**Latin Pop Airplay Imprint of the Year**: **Sony Music Latin**; Universal Music Latino; Warner Music Latina; WK	**Latin Pop Album of the Year**: **Shakira – El Dorado**; Ricardo Arjona – Circo Soledad; CNCO – Primera Cita; Juanes – Mis Planes Son Amarte
**Latin Pop Albums Label of the Year**: **Sony Music Latin**; Universal Music Latino; Warner Bros. Records; Warner Music Latina	**Latin Pop Albums Imprint of the Year**: **Sony Music Latin**; Fonovisa Records; Universal Music Latino; Warner Music Latina
**Tropical Artist of the Year – Solo**: **Romeo Santos**; Marc Anthony; Nacho; Prince Royce	**Tropical Artist of the Year – Duo or Group**: **Gente de Zona**; Chiquito Team Band; Pirulo y La Tribu; La Sonora Dinamita
**Tropical Song of the Year**: **Prince Royce and Shakira – Déjà Vu**; Nacho – Báilame; Romeo Santos – Héroe Favorito; Romeo Santos – Imitadora	**Tropical Songs Airplay Label of the Year**: **Sony Music Latin**; D.A.M.; Universal Music Latino; Warner Music Latina
**Tropical Songs Airplay Imprint of the Year**: **Sony Music Latin**; Machete Music; Magnus Media; Universal Music Latino	**Tropical Album of the Year**: **Romeo Santos – Golden**; Prince Royce – Five; La Sonora Dinamita – Juntos Por La Sonora; Carlos Vives – Vives
**Tropical Albums Label of the Year**: **Sony Music Latin**; The Orchard; Universal Music Latino; World Circuit	**Tropical Albums Imprint of the Year**: **Sony Music Latin**; Magnus Media; The Orchard; Top Stop
**Regional Mexican Artist of the Year – Solo**: **Christian Nodal**; Regulo Caro; Alfredo Olivas; Gerardo Ortíz	**Regional Mexican Artist of the Year – Duo or Group**: **Banda Sinaloense MS**; Calibre 50; Ulices Chaidez y Sus Plebes; Los Plebes Del Rancho
**Regional Mexican Song of the Year**: **Christian Nodal – Adiós Amor**; Calibre 50 – Corrido de Juanito; Calibre 50 – Siempre Te Voy A Querer; Christian Nodal featuring David Bisbal – Probablemente	**Regional Mexican Airplay Label of the Year**: **Universal Music Latino**; DEL; Lizos Music; Sony Music Latin
**Regional Mexican Airplay Imprint of the Year**: **Fonovisa Records**; Andaluz; Disa Records; DEL	**Regional Mexican Album of the Year**: **Ulices Chaidez y Sus Plebes – Andamos En El Ruedo**; Banda Sinaloense MS – La Mejor Versión de Mí; Christian Nodal – Me Dejé Llevar; Gerardo Ortiz – Comeré Callado, Vol. 1: Con Norteno, Tuba y Guitarras
**Regional Mexican Albums Label of the Year**: **Universal Music Latino**; DEL; Lizos Music; Sony Music Latin	**Regional Mexican Albums Imprint of the Year**: **DEL**; Disa Records; Fonovisa Records; Lizos Music
**Latin Rhythm Artist of the Year – Solo**: **Daddy Yankee**; J Balvin; Nicky Jam; Ozuna	**Latin Rhythm Artist of the Year – Duo or Group**: **Zion & Lennox**; Jowell & Randy; Plan B; Play-N-Skillz
**Latin Rhythm Song of the Year**: **J Balvin and Willy William featuring Beyoncé – Mi Gente**; Maluma – Felices Los 4; Nicky Jam – El Amante; Wisin featuring Ozuna – Escápate Conmigo	**Latin Rhythm Airplay Label of the Year**: **Sony Music Latin**; Pina Records; Universal Music Latino; Warner Music Latina
**Latin Rhythm Airplay Imprint of the Year**: **Sony Music Latin**; La Industria, Inc.; Universal Music Latino; WK	**Latin Rhythm Album of the Year**: **Nicky Jam – Fénix**; Ozuna – Odisea; Yandel – Update; Zion & Lennox – Motivan2
**Latin Rhythm Albums Label of the Year**: **Sony Music Latin**; El Cartel Records; Universal Music Latino; Warner Music Latina	**Latin Rhythm Albums Imprint of the Year**: **La Industria, Inc.**; Capitol Latin; Sony Music Latin; Universal Music Latino
**Songwriter of the Year**: **Daddy Yankee**; Justin Bieber; Erika Ender; Luis Fonsi; Marty James Garton; Poo Bear	**Publisher of the Year**: **Sony/ATV Latin Music Publishing, LLC (BMI)**; BMG Gold Songs (ASCAP); Sony/ATV Discos Music Publishing LLC (ASCAP); Universal Musica, Inc. (ASCAP)
**Publishing Corporation of the Year**: **Sony/ATV Music**; BMG; Universal Music; Warner/Chappell Music	**Producer of the Year**: **Mauricio Rengifo and Andrés Torres**; Chris Jeday; Saga Whiteblack; Wisin

=== Special awards ===
Lifetime Achievement Award

- Maná – In recognition of their contribution to Latin rock, their career achievements and philanthropic contributions.

=== Acts with multiple nominations ===
The following 27 acts received multiple nominations:

Nominations	Act
12	J Balvin
12	Shakira
10	Luis Fonsi
10	Maluma
10	Ozuna
10	Daddy Yankee
8	Justin Bieber
7	Beyoncé
6	Willy William
5	Calibre 50
5	Nicky Jam
5	Christian Nodal
5	Romeo Santos
5	Wisin
4	CNCO
4	Zion & Lennox
3	Banda Sinaloense MS
3	Enrique Iglesias
2	Marc Anthony
2	Ricardo Arjona
2	Juanes
2	La Sonora Dinamita
2	Jennifer Lopez
2	Los Plebes del Rancho
2	Nacho
2	Gerardo Ortíz
2	Ulices Chaidez y Sus Plebes

== Presenters and performers ==
=== Presenters ===
As of April 12, 2018, confirmed presenters include Erika Ender, Oswaldo Silva, Alan Ramirez, Reykon, Yuridia, Diego Boneta, Leila Cobo, Gianluca Vacchi, Fernanda Castillo, Raúl Méndez, Carmen Villalobos, Catherine Siachoque, Aylin Mujica, Ana María Polo, Candela Ferro, Ana Jurka, and Karim Mendiburu.

=== Performers ===
As of April 19, 2018, confirmed performers include Jennifer Lopez, Bad Bunny, Becky G, Calibre 50, Cardi B, Chayanne, Christian Nodal, CNCO, Daddy Yankee, David Bisbal, De La Ghetto, Farruko, J Balvin, Karol G, Luis Fonsi, Maluma, Natti Natasha, Nicky Jam, Ozuna, Paty Cantu, Quavo, Reik, Ricky Martin, Sebastian Yatra, Sofia Reyes, Victor Manuelle and Wisin & Yandel.
