= List of Billboard Latin Rhythm Airplay number ones of 2019 =

The Billboard Latin Rhythm Airplay is a chart that ranks the best-performing Spanish-language Latin rhythm singles in the United States. Published by Billboard magazine, the data is compiled by Nielsen SoundScan based collectively on each single's weekly airplay.

== Chart history ==
Key
†	Indicates number 1 on Billboard's year-end Latin rhythm chart

Issue date	Song	Artist	Ref
January 5	"Mia"	Bad Bunny featuring Drake	
January 12	"Mia"	Bad Bunny featuring Drake	
January 19	"Mia"	Bad Bunny featuring Drake	
January 26	"Reggaetón en lo Oscuro"	Wisin & Yandel	
February 2	"Ella Quiere Beber"	Anuel AA and Romeo Santos	
February 9	"Mia"	Bad Bunny featuring Drake	
February 16	"Mia"	Bad Bunny featuring Drake	
February 23	"Imposible"	Luis Fonsi and Ozuna	
March 2	"Créeme"	Karol G & Maluma	
March 9	"Sola"	Manuel Turizo	
March 16	"Con Calma" †	Daddy Yankee featuring Snow	
March 23	"Con Calma" †	Daddy Yankee featuring Snow	
March 30	"Con Calma" †	Daddy Yankee featuring Snow	
April 6	"Con Calma" †	Daddy Yankee featuring Snow	
April 13	"Con Calma" †	Daddy Yankee featuring Snow	
April 20	"Con Calma" †	Daddy Yankee featuring Snow	
April 27	"Con Calma" †	Daddy Yankee featuring Snow	
May 4	"Secreto"	Anuel AA and Karol G	
May 11	"Baila, Baila, Baila"	Ozuna, Daddy Yankee, J Balvin, Farruko, and Anuel AA	
May 18	"Me Gusta"	Natti Natasha	
May 25	"Con Calma" †	Daddy Yankee featuring Snow	
June 1	"Con Calma" †	Daddy Yankee featuring Snow	
June 8	"HP"	Maluma	
June 15	"Con Calma" †	Daddy Yankee featuring Snow	
June 22	"Con Calma" †	Daddy Yankee featuring Snow	
June 29	"Con Calma" †	Daddy Yankee featuring Snow	
July 6	"Aullando"	Wisin & Yandel and Romeo Santos	
July 13	"Soltera"	Lunay, Daddy Yankee, Bad Bunny	
July 20	"Soltera"	Lunay, Daddy Yankee, Bad Bunny	
July 27	"Te Robaré"	Nicky Jam and Ozuna	
August 3	"Callaíta"	Bad Bunny and Tainy	
August 10	"Qué Pretendes"	J Balvin and Bad Bunny	
August 17	"Si Me Das Tu Amor"	Carlos Vives and Wisin	
August 24	"Qué Pretendes"	J Balvin and Bad Bunny	
August 31	"Otro Trago"	Sech, Darell, Nicky Jam, Ozuna, Anuel AA	
September 7	"Te soñé de nuevo"	Ozuna	
September 14	"No Lo Trates"	Pitbull, Natti Natasha and Daddy Yankee	
September 21	"China"	Anuel AA, Daddy Yankee, and Karol G featuring Ozuna, and J Balvin	
September 28	"Qué Pretendes"	J Balvin and Bad Bunny	
October 5	"Runaway"	Sebastián Yatra, Daddy Yankee, and Natti Natasha featuring Jonas Brothers	
October 12	"Si Supieras"	Daddy Yankee and Wisin & Yandel	
October 19	"China"	Anuel AA, Daddy Yankee, and Karol G featuring Ozuna, and J Balvin	
October 26	"China"	Anuel AA, Daddy Yankee, and Karol G featuring Ozuna, and J Balvin	
November 2	"Loco Contigo"	DJ Snake, J. Balvin & Tyga	
November 9	"Aventura"	Lunay, Ozuna and Anuel AA	
November 16	"China"	Anuel AA, Daddy Yankee, and Karol G featuring Ozuna, and J Balvin	
November 23	"11 PM"	Maluma	
November 30	"La Canción"	J Balvin and Bad Bunny	
December 7	"La Canción"	J Balvin and Bad Bunny	
December 14	"Hasta Que Salga El Sol"	Ozuna	
December 21	"Que Tire Pa Lante"	Daddy Yankee	
December 28	"Yo x Ti, Tú x Mí"	Rosalía and Ozuna	
