= List of number-one Billboard Latin Pop Airplay songs of 2019 =

The Billboard Latin Pop Airplay is a chart that ranks the best-performing Spanish-language Pop music singles of the United States. Published by Billboard magazine, the data are compiled by Nielsen SoundScan based collectively on each single's weekly airplay.

== Chart history ==
Issue date	Song	Artist	Ref
January 5	"Taki Taki"	DJ Snake featuring Selena Gomez, Ozuna and Cardi B	
January 12	"Taki Taki"	DJ Snake featuring Selena Gomez, Ozuna and Cardi B	
January 19	"MIA"	Bad Bunny featuring Drake	
January 26	"MIA"	Bad Bunny featuring Drake	
February 2	"MIA"	Bad Bunny featuring Drake	
February 9	"MIA"	Bad Bunny featuring Drake	
February 16	"MIA"	Bad Bunny featuring Drake	
February 23	"MIA"	Bad Bunny featuring Drake	
March 2	"Créeme"	Karol G & Maluma	
March 9	"MIA"	Bad Bunny featuring Drake	
March 16	"MIA"	Bad Bunny featuring Drake	
March 23	"MIA"	Bad Bunny featuring Drake	
March 30	"Con Calma"	Daddy Yankee featuring Snow	
April 6	"Con Calma"	Daddy Yankee featuring Snow	
April 13	"Calma"	Pedro Capó featuring Farruko	
April 20	"Con Calma"	Daddy Yankee featuring Snow	
April 27	"Con Calma"	Daddy Yankee featuring Snow	
May 4	"Con Calma"	Daddy Yankee featuring Snow	
May 11	"Con Calma"	Daddy Yankee featuring Snow	
May 18	"Con Calma"	Daddy Yankee featuring Snow	
May 25	"Con Calma"	Daddy Yankee featuring Snow	
June 1	"Con Calma"	Daddy Yankee featuring Snow	
June 8	"Con Calma"	Daddy Yankee featuring Snow	
June 15	"Con Calma"	Daddy Yankee featuring Snow	
June 22	"Con Calma"	Daddy Yankee featuring Snow	
June 29	"Con Calma"	Daddy Yankee featuring Snow	
July 6	"Con Calma"	Daddy Yankee featuring Snow	
July 13	"Con Calma"	Daddy Yankee featuring Snow	
July 20	"Con Calma"	Daddy Yankee featuring Snow	
July 27	"Qué Pretendes"	J Balvin and Bad Bunny	
August 3	"Qué Pretendes"	J Balvin and Bad Bunny	
August 10	"Qué Pretendes"	J Balvin and Bad Bunny	
August 17	"Qué Pretendes"	J Balvin and Bad Bunny	
August 24	"Qué Pretendes"	J Balvin and Bad Bunny	
August 31	"Qué Pretendes"	J Balvin and Bad Bunny	
September 7	"Qué Pretendes"	J Balvin and Bad Bunny	
September 14	"No Lo Trates"	Pitbull, Natti Natasha and Daddy Yankee	
September 21	"Qué Pretendes"	J Balvin and Bad Bunny	
September 28	"Qué Pretendes"	J Balvin and Bad Bunny	
October 5	"Qué Pretendes"	J Balvin and Bad Bunny	
October 12	"China"	Anuel AA, Daddy Yankee, Karol G, Ozuna and J Balvin	
October 19	"Date La Vuelta"	Luis Fonsi, Sebastian Yatra & Nicky Jam	
October 26	"China"	Anuel AA, Daddy Yankee, Karol G, Ozuna and J Balvin	
November 2	"Loco Contigo"	DJ Snake, J. Balvin & Tyga	
November 9	"Bonita"	Juanes and Sebastián Yatra	
November 16	"Bonita"	Juanes and Sebastián Yatra	
November 23	"11 PM"	Maluma	
November 30	"La Canción"	J Balvin & Bad Bunny	
December 7	"La Canción"	J Balvin & Bad Bunny	
December 14	"Hasta Que Salga El Sol"	Ozuna	
December 21	"Hasta Que Salga El Sol"	Ozuna	
December 28	"Hasta Que Salga El Sol"	Ozuna	
