= Colin Tilley =

American music video director and filmmaker (born 1988)

- Born: June 27, 1988 (age 38)
- Occupations: Music video director, commercial director, filmmaker
- Website: boyinthecastle.com

Colin Tilley (born June 27, 1988) is an American filmmaker, music video director, and television commercial director. Tilley is the CEO and owner of Boy in the Castle Productions. He has directed more than several hundred music videos.

Tilley directed, produced, and executive produced his first short film, Mr. Happy, starring Chance the Rapper, in 2014. Tilley has produced, written and directed television commercials, including Balmain, Reebok, Yves Saint Laurent, Antonio Banderas, Kylie Jenner's "Glosses", Audi, and Nicki Minaj's perfume, Pink Friday.

Tilley has also produced and directed music videos for Kendrick Lamar, Future, Cardi B, Justin Bieber, J Balvin, The Kid LAROI, Chris Brown, Nicki Minaj, The Game, Enrique Iglesias, Iggy Azalea, Post Malone, Zendaya, Megan Thee Stallion, Justin Timberlake, Ciara, 50 Cent, Tyga, AGNEZ MO, Lil Wayne, Karol G, Halsey, Skrillex, DJ Snake, Lisa, Rosé and Britney Spears, among others.

Tilley directed If I Can't Have Love I Want Power, a concept feature film starring Halsey. The film was released August 25, 2021. Tilley was honored at Camerimage in November 2021 for Achievement in Music Videos. Tilley created an NFT called Castle Kids in December 2021. In 2025, Tilley made his feature-length directorial debut with Eye for an Eye, also known as Night Terror in the UK, which is an adaptation from the horror adult book Mr.Sandman by Elisa Victoria.

== Videography ==
2009

- "My Cowboy", Jessie James
- "Fireball", Dev

2010

- "Never Let You Go", Justin Bieber
- "Deuces", Chris Brown featuring Tyga and Kevin McCall
- "No Bullshit", Chris Brown
- "U Smile", Justin Bieber
- "Make a Movie", Twista featuring Chris Brown
- "Perfect Nightmare", Shontelle
- "Swagger Right", RichGirl featuring Fabolous and Rick Ross
- "Yeah 3x", Chris Brown
- "Mean Mug", Soulja Boy featuring 50 Cent
- "Down on Me", Jeremih featuring 50 Cent
- "Ass on the Floor", Diddy – Dirty Money featuring Swizz Beatz
- "Champion", Chipmunk featuring Chris Brown

2011

- "Another Planet", Jawan Harris featuring Chris Brown
- "Yesterday", Diddy – Dirty Money featuring Chris Brown
- "Gone and Never Coming Back", Melanie Fiona
- "In the Air", Chipmunk featuring Keri Hilson
- "Look at Me Now" featuring Chris Brown featuring Busta Rhymes and Lil Wayne
- "One Night Stand", Keri Hilson featuring Chris Brown
- "Your Love", Diddy – Dirty Money featuring Rick Ross and Trey Songz
- "Someone to Love Me (Naked)", Mary J. Blige featuring Lil' Wayne and Diddy
- "John", Lil Wayne featuring Rick Ross
- "Looking for Love", Diddy – Dirty Money featuring Usher
- "My Button", Shanell
- "She Ain't You", Chris Brown
- "Lose Control", Keri Hilson featuring Nelly
- "Better with the Lights Off", New Boyz featuring Chris Brown
- "Next 2 You", Chris Brown featuring Justin Bieber
- "Ballin'", Young Jeezy featuring Lil Wayne
- "It Girl", Jason Derulo
- "4 AM", Melanie Fiona
- "Fly Together", Red Café featuring Ryan Leslie and Rick Ross
- "Fa La La", Justin Bieber featuring Boyz II Men
- "Breathing", Jason Derulo
- "Strip", Chris Brown featuring Kevin McCall
- "Another Round", Fat Joe featuring Chris Brown

2012

- "Shot Caller" (Remix), French Montana featuring Diddy, Rick Ross and Charlie Rock
- "Take It to the Head", DJ Khaled featuring Chris Brown, Rick Ross, Nicki Minaj and Lil Wayne
- "This Time", Melanie Fiona featuring J. Cole
- "Don't Wake Me Up", Chris Brown
- "I Can Only Imagine, David Guetta featuring Chris Brown and Lil Wayne
- "Live It Up", Tulisa featuring Tyga
- "I Am Your Leader", Nicki Minaj featuring Cam'ron and Rick Ross
- "Turn Around", Conor Maynard featuring Ne-Yo
- "Stereo", Machine Gun Kelly
- "Don't Judge Me", Chris Brown
- "The Boys", Nicki Minaj and Cassie
- "Freedom", Nicki Minaj
- "No Worries", Lil Wayne featuring Detail

2013

- "All Around the World", Mindless Behavior
- "Kisses Down Low", Kelly Rowland
- "Molly" featuring Tyga featuring Cedric Gervais, Wiz Khalifa and Mally Mall
- "For the Road", Tyga featuring Chris Brown
- "Beat It", Sean Kingston featuring Chris Brown and Wiz Khalifa
- "The Other Side", Jason Derulo
- "Replay", Zendaya
- "What About Love", Austin Mahone
- "No New Friends", DJ Khaled featuring Drake, Rick Ross and Lil Wayne (co-directed with Drake)
- "We Outchea", Ace Hood
- "Show You", Tyga featuring Future
- "Get Like Me", Nelly featuring Nicki Minaj and Pharrell
- "Talk Dirty", Jason Derulo featuring 2 Chainz
- "I Wanna Be with You", DJ Khaled featuring Future, Nicki Minaj and Rick Ross
- "Honest", Future
- "Big Dipper", The Cataracs featuring Luciana
- "Hijack", Tyga featuring 2 Chainz
- "Sweet Serenade", Pusha T featuring Chris Brown
- "Heart Attack", Enrique Iglesias
- "No Games", Rick Ross featuring Future
- "Trumpets", Jason Derulo
- "All That Matters", Justin Bieber

2014

- "Ride", SoMo
- "Confident", Justin Bieber featuring Chance the Rapper
- "I'm a Freak", Enrique Iglesias featuring Pitbull
- "Coke Bottle", AGNEZ MO featuring Timbaland and T.I.
- "Next Time (Won't Give My Heart Away)", Keyshia Cole
- "Senile", Young Money
- "Salute", Little Mix
- "Wiggle", Jason Derulo
- "24 Hours", TeeFLii
- "Crazy Stupid Love", Cheryl (formerly known as Cheryl Cole) featuring Tinie Tempah
- "Krazy", Lil Wayne
- "Anaconda", Nicki Minaj
- "I Don't Care", Cheryl
- "Good Boy", G-Dragon X Taeyang (from BigBang)

2015

- "Coming with You", Ne-Yo
- "Ayo", Chris Brown and Tyga
- "Mirror Man", Ella Henderson
- "I Like Tuh", Carnage
- "Want to Want Me", Jason Derulo
- "Back It Up", Prince Royce
- "Alright", Kendrick Lamar
- "Do It Again", Pia Mia featuring Chris Brown
- "Live Forever", The Band Perry
- "Body On Me", Rita Ora featuring Chris Brown
- "Levels", Nick Jonas
- "Never Leave", DVBBS
- "These Walls", Kendrick Lamar

2016

- "No Chill" featuring Vic Mensa and Skrillex
- "Middle", DJ Snake featuring Bipolar Sunshine
- "That Part", Schoolboy Q featuring Kanye West
- "I Wanna Know", Alesso
- "M.I.L.F. $", Fergie
- "My PYT", Wale
- "Purple Lamborghini", Skrillex featuring Rick Ross
- "Slumber Party", Britney Spears featuring Tinashe

2017

- "I Love You", Axwell & Ingrosso
- "iSpy" featuring Kyle featuring Lil Yachty
- "Mask Off", Future
- "Whippin", Kiiara featuring Felix Snow
- "Wild Thoughts", DJ Khaled featuring Rihanna and Bryson Tiller
- "Self-Made", Bryson Tiller
- "Deserve", Kris Wu featuring Travis Scott
- "A Different Way", DJ Snake featuring Lauv
- "Wolves", Selena Gomez and Marshmello

2018

- "Supernova", Ansel Elgort
- "Savior", Iggy Azalea
- "No Excuses", Meghan Trainor
- "Sober", G-Eazy featuring Charlie Puth
- "Playinwitme", Kyle featuring Kehlani
- "Remind Me to Forget", Kygo featuring Miguel
- "What You Want", Belly featuring The Weeknd
- "Let You Be Right", Meghan Trainor
- "The Bloodiest", Jay Rock
- "Kream", Iggy Azalea featuring Tyga
- "The Way I Am", Charlie Puth
- "No Brainer", DJ Khaled featuring Justin Bieber, Chance the Rapper and Quavo
- "Taki Taki", DJ Snake featuring Selena Gomez, Ozuna and Cardi B
- "Without Me", Halsey
- "Tints", Anderson .Paak featuring Kendrick Lamar
- "Good Form", Nicki Minaj featuring Lil Wayne

2019

- "Jumpin on a Jet", Future
- "11 Minutes", Yungblud featuring Halsey and Travis Barker
- "Pure Water", Mustard and Migos
- "Sally Walker", Iggy Azalea
- "F&N", Future
- "Started", Iggy Azalea
- "Loco Contigo", DJ Snake, J Balvin and Tyga
- "Qué Pretendes", J Balvin featuring Bad Bunny
- "Goodbyes", Post Malone featuring Young Thug
- "100 Bands", Mustard, Quavo, 21 Savage, YG and Meek Mill
- "Fuck It Up", Iggy Azalea featuring Kash Doll
- "Icy", Logic featuring Gucci Mane
- "Cuidao por Ahí", J Balvin and Bad Bunny
- "Qué Calor", Major Lazer Featuring J Balvin and El Alfa
- "Circles", Post Malone
- "Ritmo (Bad Boys for Life)", The Black Eyed Peas featuring J Balvin
- "Hasta Que Salga El Sol | Cap.2", Ozuna
- "Blanco", J Balvin

2020

- "You Should Be Sad", Halsey
- "Morado", J Balvin
- "Rojo", J Balvin
- "Amarillo", J Balvin
- "Gris", J Balvin
- "Rosa", J Balvin
- "Azul", J Balvin
- "Negro", J Balvin
- "WAP", Cardi B featuring Megan Thee Stallion
- "Holy", Justin Bieber featuring Chance the Rapper
- "Don't Stop", Megan Thee Stallion featuring Young Thug
- "Bichota", Karol G
- "La Luz", Sech and J Balvin
- "Body", Megan Thee Stallion
- "Monster", Shawn Mendes and Justin Bieber

2021

- "Anyone", Justin Bieber
- "Cry Baby", Megan Thee Stallion featuring DaBaby
- "Location", Karol G, Anuel AA and J Balvin
- "Hold On", Justin Bieber
- "Peaches", Justin Bieber featuring Daniel Caesar and Giveon
- "Otra Noche Sin Ti", J Balvin and Khalid
- "Let It Go", DJ Khaled featuring Justin Bieber and 21 Savage
- "Stay", The Kid Laroi and Justin Bieber
- "I Am Not a Woman, I'm a God", Halsey
- "The Anonymous Ones", SZA
- "SEJODIOTO", Karol G
- "Ghost", Justin Bieber

2022

- "Girl Is a Gun", Halsey
- "Attention", Omah Lay and Justin Bieber
- "Memories", Yungblud and Willow
- "More Than Life", Machine Gun Kelly featuring glaive
- "Real Talk", Roddy Ricch
- "How", Ella Mai featuring Roddy Ricch
- "Her", Megan Thee Stallion
- "Beautiful", DJ Khaled featuring SZA and Future
- "Ungrateful", Megan Thee Stallion featuring Key Glock

2024

- "Roc Steady", Megan Thee Stallion featuring Flo Milli

2025

- "Love in Real Life", Lizzo
- "Still Bad", Lizzo
- "Just One Last Time", David Guetta
- "Bitches N Marijuana", Chris Brown and Tyga
- "Matrix", Chris Brown
- "Why", Mary J. Blige featuring Rick Ross
- "She Makes Me Wanna", JLS featuring Dev
- "No Sleep", Wiz Khalifa
- "Fascinated", FreeSol featuring Justin Timberlake
- "Witches Brew", Katy B
- "We Can Go Down", Lil B
- "Stuck on a Feeling", Prince Royce featuring Snoop Dogg
- "Movin", Mohombi
- "Shout Out", Birdman
- "Do It Like This", The Turf Starz
- "Bag of Money", Rick Ross featuring Wale, T-Pain and Meek Mill
- "I'm Gone" featuring Big Sean, Tyga
- "Faded", Tyga featuring Lil Wayne
- "I'm on It", Tyga featuring Lil Wayne
- "Dope", Tyga featuring Rick Ross
- "My Glory", Tyga
- "Do My Dance", Tyga featuring 2 Chainz
- "Nobody's Perfect", J. Cole featuring Missy Elliott
- "Girls Go Wild", 50 Cent featuring Jeremih
- "Speechless", Ciara
- "Rockstar", Dappy feat. Brian May
- "Good Intentions", Dappy
- "Yin Yang", Dappy
- "Ain't Thinkin' 'Bout You", Bow Wow (rapper) featuring Chris Brown
- "Best Damn Night", Six D
- Last Time, Labrinth
- "99 Problems", Hugo
- "In Da Box", Sean Garrett featuring Rick Ross
- "Sex Music", Tank
- "Let's Get It In", Lloyd featuring 50 Cent
- "Let's Get Naughty", Jessie and The Toy Boys
- "Dark Shades", Birdman featuring Lil Wayne and Mack Maine
- "Louder", Neon Jungle
- "Can't Stop The Love", Neon Jungle
- T.A.O, Z.Tao
- "JULY", Kris Wu
- "Sax", Fleur East
- "Spectacular", Curtis Roach
- "Happy Now", Kygo featuring Sandro Cavazza
- "Shot Clock", Ella Mai
- "Medicine", Jennifer Lopez featuring French Montana
- "In the Dark", YG
- "Go Loko", YG, Tyga, Jon Z
- "Carry On", Kygo, Rita Ora
- "Summer Days", Martin Garrix, Macklemore, Patrick Stump
- "Yo Le Llego", J. Balvin, Bad Bunny
- "Qué Pretendes", J. Balvin, Bad Bunny
- "Wiggle It", French Montana Featuring City Girls
- "Gold Roses", Rick Ross featuring Drake
- "La Canción", J. Balvin, Bad Bunny
- "Que Pena", Maluma, J Balvin
- "Un Peso", J Balvin, Bad Bunny
- "Fuego", DJ Snake, Sean Paul, Anitta, Tainy
- "Verde", J Balvin
- "Ten Cuidado", J Balvin
- "SG", DJ Snake, Ozuna, Lisa, Megan Thee Stallion
- "Messy", Rosé
- "On My Mind", Alex Warren, Rosé

2026

- "Chat", Girlset

== Films ==
- Mr. Happy (2015)
- If I Can't Have Love, I Want Power (2021)
- Eye for an Eye (2025)

== Awards and nominations ==
| Year | Work | Award | Result | Ref |
|---|---|---|---|---|
| 2011 | "Look at Me Now" by Chris Brown featuring Lil Wayne and Busta Rhymes | BET Award for Video of the Year | Won | |
| 2011 | "Look at Me Now" by Chris Brown featuring Lil Wayne and Busta Rhymes | BET Hip Hop Award for Best Hip Hop Video | Won | |
| 2011 | "Look at Me Now" by Chris Brown featuring Lil Wayne and Busta Rhymes | MTV Video Music Award for Best Hip Hop Video | Nominated | |
| 2011 | "Look at Me Now" by Chris Brown featuring Lil Wayne and Busta Rhymes | MTV Video Music Award for Best Collaboration | Nominated | |
| 2011 | "Deuces" by Chris Brown featuring Tyga and Kevin McCall | MTV Video Music Award for Best Collaboration | Nominated | |
| 2011 | "U Smile" by Justin Bieber | MTV Video Music Award for Best Male Video | Won | |
| 2013 | "What About Love" by Austin Mahone | MTV Video Music Award for Artist to Watch | Won | |
| 2014 | | BET Hip Hop Award for Director of the Year | Nominated | |
| 2015 | "Anaconda" by Nicki Minaj | BET Award for Video of the Year | Nominated | |
| 2015 | "Anaconda" by Nicki Minaj | MTV Video Music Award for Best Hip Hop Video | Won | |
| 2015 | "Anaconda" by Nicki Minaj | MTV Video Music Award for Best Female Video | Nominated | |
| 2015 | "Alright" by Kendrick Lamar | Grammy Award for Best Music Video | Nominated | |
| 2015 | "Alright" by Kendrick Lamar | MTV Video Music Award for Best Direction | Won | |
| 2015 | "Alright" by Kendrick Lamar | MTV Video Music Award for Video of the Year | Nominated | |
| 2015 | "Alright" by Kendrick Lamar | MTV Video Music Award for Best Male Video | Nominated | |
| 2015 | "Alright" by Kendrick Lamar | MTV Video Music Award for Best Hip Hop Video | Nominated | |
| 2015 | "Alright" by Kendrick Lamar | MTV EMA for Best Video | Nominated | |
| 2015 | "Alright" by Kendrick Lamar | Camerimage Film Festival for Video of the Year | Won | |
| 2015 | "Alright" by Kendrick Lamar | Camerimage Film Festival for Best Cinematography | Won | |
| 2015 | "Alright" by Kendrick Lamar | UK Music Video Award for Best Urban Video | Won | |
| 2015 | "Alright" by Kendrick Lamar | UK Music Video Award for Video of the Year | Won | |
| 2015 | "Alright" by Kendrick Lamar | UK Music Video Award for Best Cinematography | Won | |
| 2015 | "Alright" by Kendrick Lamar | UK Music Video Award for Director of the Year | Nominated | |
| 2016 | "M.I.L.F. $" by Fergie | MTV Video Music Award for Best Art Direction | Nominated | |
| 2016 | "I Wanna Know" by Alesso featuring Nico & Vinz | MTV Video Music Award for Best Cinematography | Nominated | |
| 2016 | "I Wanna Know" by Alesso featuring Nico & Vinz | MTV Video Music Award for Best Editing | Nominated | |
| 2016 | | BET Hip Hop Award for Director of the Year | Nominated | |
| 2016 | ''Alright'' by Kendrick Lamar | Berlin Music Video Awards 2016 for Best Director | Won | |
| 2017 | "Wild Thoughts" by DJ Khaled featuring Rihanna and Bryson Tiller | BET Hip Hop Award for Video of the Year | Nominated | |
| 2017 | "Wild Thoughts" by DJ Khaled featuring Rihanna and Bryson Tiller | MTV Video Music Award for Video of the Year | Nominated | |
| 2017 | "Wild Thoughts" by DJ Khaled featuring Rihanna and Bryson Tiller | MTV Video Music Award for Best Collaboration | Nominated | |
| 2017 | "Wild Thoughts" by DJ Khaled featuring Rihanna and Bryson Tiller | MTV Video Music Award for Best Art Direction | Nominated | |
| 2017 | "iSpy" by Kyle and Lil Yachty | BET Hip Hop Award for Video of the Year | Nominated | |
| 2017 | "iSpy" by Kyle and Lil Yachty | MTV Video Music Award for Best Visual Effects | Nominated | |
| 2017 | "Mask Off" by Future | MTV Video Music Award for Best Editing | Nominated | |
| 2017 | "Mask Off" by Future | MTV EMA for Best Video | Nominated | |
| 2017 | | BET Hip Hop Award for Director of the Year | Nominated | |
| 2019 | "Tints" by Anderson .Paak featuring Kendrick Lamar | MTV Video Music Award for Best Cinematography | Nominated | |
| 2019 | | MTV Video Music Award for Best Editing | Nominated | |
| 2019 | "Taki Taki" by DJ Snake featuring Selena Gomez, Ozuna and Cardi B | MTV Video Music Award for Best Dance | Nominated | |
| 2020 | "Blanco" by J Balvin | Premios Nuestra Tierra for Best Video | Won | |
| 2020 | "Circles" by Post Malone | MTV Video Music Award for Song of the Year | Nominated | |
| 2020 | "RITMO" by Black Eyed Peas featuring J Balvin | MTV Video Music Award for Best Collaboration | Nominated | |
| 2020 | "You Should Be Sad" by Halsey | MTV Video Music Award for Best Pop | Nominated | |
| 2020 | "Amarillo" by J Balvin | MTV Video Music Award for Best Latin | Nominated | |
| 2020 | "Qué Pena" by Maluma featuring J Balvin | MTV Video Music Award for Best Latin | Won | |
| 2020 | "Rojo" by J Balvin | Premios Juventud for Video with a Powerful Message | Won | |
| 2020 | "Rojo" by J Balvin | Latin GRAMMY Award for Best Short Form Music Video | Nominated | |
| 2020 | | BET Hip Hop Award for Director of the Year | Nominated | |
| 2020 | "WAP" by Cardi B featuring Megan Thee Stallion | E! People's Choice Award for The Music Video of 2020 | Nominated | |
| 2020 | "Holy" by Justin Bieber featuring Chance The Rapper | E! People's Choice Award for The Music Video of 2020 | Nominated | |
| 2020 | "WAP" by Cardi B featuring Megan Thee Stallion | MTV EMA for Best Video | Nominated | |
| 2021 | "WAP" by Cardi B featuring Megan Thee Stallion | Berlin Music Video Awards 2021 for Best Art Director | Nominated | |
| 2021 | "WAP" by Cardi B featuring Megan Thee Stallion | BET Awards 2021 - Video of the Year | Won | |
| 2021 | | BET Awards 2021 - Director of the Year | Nominated | |
