= China (Anuel AA song) =

2019 single by Anuel AA, Daddy Yankee, Karol G

Single by Anuel AA, Daddy Yankee, and Karol G featuring Ozuna and J Balvin

from the album Emmanuel
- Language: Spanish
- Released: July 19, 2019
- Recorded: 2018
- Genre: Reggaeton; moombahton
- Length: 5:01
- Label: Real Hasta la Muerte
- Songwriters: Emmanuel Gazmey; Ramón Ayala; Carolina Giraldo; Juan Carlos Ozuna; José Osorio; Orville Burrell; Rickardo Ducent; Shaun Pizzonia; Brian Thompson; Harold Ray Brown; Le Roy Lonnie Jordan; Charles William Miller; Lee Oskar; Howard E. Scott; B.B. Dickerson
- Producers: Tainy; DJ Snake; Max Borghetti

Anuel AA singles chronology
"Cambio" (2018)	"China" (2019)	"Otro Trago (Remix)" (2019)

Daddy Yankee singles chronology
"Instagram" (2019)	"China" (2019)	"Que Tire Pa Lante" (2019)

Karol G singles chronology
"Dices Que Te Vas" (2019)	"China" (2019)	"Tusa" (2019)

Ozuna singles chronology
"Muito Calor" (2019)	"China" (2019)	"Yo x ti, tú x mí" (2019)

J Balvin singles chronology
"Qué Pretendes" (2019)	"China" (2019)	"La Canción" (2019)

Music video
- "China" on YouTube

"China" is a song by Puerto Rican rappers Anuel AA and Daddy Yankee and Colombian singer Karol G with Puerto Rican singer Ozuna and Colombian singer J Balvin from Anuel AA's second studio album Emmanuel, released July 19, 2019, through Anuel AA's label, Real Hasta la Muerte, featuring a music video directed by Marlon Peña. The official music video was immediately popular, and has received over 2.3 billion views on YouTube, placing it among each respective artist's most-viewed videos on the platform. "China" samples the 2000 song "It Wasn't Me" by Jamaican musician Shaggy, which itself interpolates War's "Smile Happy" hence the writers of both songs (despite the latter never appearing on the track) are credited as songwriters for this song. It was also written by Anuel AA, Daddy Yankee, Karol G, Ozuna, and J Balvin, and was produced by Puerto Rican record producer Tainy.

It has been described as a reggaetón song with lyrics about infidelity at a nightclub and getting caught red-handed. Commercially, the song peaked at No. 1 in Argentina, Bolivia, Colombia, Mexico, Peru and Spain, and reached the top 10 in nine other countries. In the United States, it has topped the Billboard Hot Latin Songs chart and peaked at No. 43 on the mainstream Billboard Hot 100. In Europe, the single charted within the top 15 in Switzerland and Italy. In 2020, "China" received Latin Grammy award nominations for Record of the Year and Best Urban Fusion Performance.

== Background ==
"China" was written by Anuel AA, Daddy Yankee, Karol G, Ozuna, and J Balvin, and was produced by Puerto Rican Latin Grammy Award-winner record producer Tainy. Tainy had previously worked with Anuel AA on "Sola" (2016), with Daddy Yankee on "Noche de Entierro" (2006), "Bella y Sensual" and "Si Supieras" (2019), with Karol G on "Mi Mala" (2017), with Ozuna on "No Quiero Amores" (2017), and with J Balvin on the majority of his albums Vibras (2018) and Oasis (2019). He had also co-produced the Grammy Award-nominated song "I Like It" (2018) by Cardi B, Bad Bunny, and J Balvin.

Anuel AA told Billboard in July 2019 that he "had been looking to revive a classic" and chose Shaggy's "It Wasn't Me" because it "hit" him. He started listening to old songs and remembered Shaggy's track from his childhood. He told XXL that "when [he] used to go with the big boys in [his] hood to the club, they put that song on and everybody used to go crazy". He chose to redo "It Wasn't Me" and supposed that there would not be any problems with the release due to Shaggy's collaborations with Hispanic artists. He recorded the song and sent the mix to Daddy Yankee, who "went crazy about it" and finished recording his verse in three days. Anuel AA then showed it to his girlfriend Karol G at their home and she opined that it was "the best track [she has] heard from [him]". He wanted her on the record because she liked it and "[they] always help each other" and started to think about "classics that had all the big names in them".

After some time, he met Ozuna and showed the song to him, who "went crazy as well" and recorded his part. J Balvin was the last one to record, as the original collaboration did not include him, according to Anuel AA's announcement in April 2019. Balvin's participation was revealed by Billboard two months later. Anuel AA has stated that it is "the strongest song of [his] career up to date". He referred to the track as a "mix of different cultures with each of the collaborators contributing with its own flow". The song's title comes from the "strong Chinese elements" on Shaggy's "It Wasn't Me".

== Composition ==
"China" has been referred to as a reggaeton song with a length of five minutes and one second. It samples and is a Spanish-language adaptation of Jamaican singer Shaggy's 2000 single "It Wasn't Me". Much like "It Wasn't Me", the lyrics to "China" speak of infidelity and getting caught red-handed. Jessica Roiz of Billboard wrote that the song is about "meeting someone at the club, having a good time and forgetting about their significant other". In addition to the song's sample, the song also interpolates lyrics from Daddy Yankee's 2007 single "Ella Me Levantó". Billboard's Leila Cobo described the song as a "reggaeton explosion", while Jessica Roiz referred to it as "a fun Latin urban-meets-EDM" and a "Latin-EDM twist" to Shaggy's "It Wasn't Me". Suzy Exposito of Rolling Stone described it as "an EDM-reggaeton rework of Shaggy's 2000 cheaters' anthem".

== Release and reception ==
"China" was made available for digital download and online streaming on July 19, 2019, by Anuel AA's record label Real Hasta la Muerte. Leila Cobo of Billboard wrote that the song "is the trap star's ultimate redemption" which "allows each artist to shine in an eminently danceable and commercially proven track that stays true to the original while managing to be completely refreshing". Suzy Exposito of Rolling Stone stated that Anuel AA "strikes gold" with the song. Raúl Gillén of Spanish music website Jenesaispop praised the chorus and "that strident 'Mi Gente'-style trumpet that has been exploited so much in recent years". He also wrote that the song could become reggaeton's summer hit in Spain due to the performers' fame and its "undeniable magnetism".

In order to promote the song, Anuel AA encouraged people on social media to take part of the China Challenge, which consists of uploading a video dancing to the song, imitating the movements of a person in a wheelchair. Editors of Spanish newspapers Okdiario and La Vanguardia found the challenge inappropriate, disrespectful and offensive. Colombian newspaper El Universal reported that numerous Instagram users criticized it for being "a mockery to people in wheelchairs". Anuel AA explained that the dance move was based on a scene from Walt Disney Productions' 1940 film Pinocchio.

== Commercial performance ==
In the United States, "China" debuted at number two on Billboard's Hot Latin Songs chart on the issue dated August 3, 2019, and topped both the Latin Digital Songs and Latin Streaming Songs charts with 1,000 downloads sold and 14.1 million streams. The single subsequently peaked at number one on the week ending August 17, 2019, becoming Anuel AA's third number-one and 10th top 10 on Hot Latin Songs, as well as his highest-charting single as a lead artist on the list. The track also garnered Daddy Yankee his seventh number-one and 29th top 10 on Hot Latin Songs, tying with Chayanne, Cristian Castro and Shakira as the third artist with most top 10s on the chart since its inception in 1986. It also became J Balvin's sixth number-one song, Ozuna's fourth, and Karol G's first.

On the mainstream US Billboard Hot 100, the song debuted at No. 52 for the week ending August 3, 2019, becoming Anuel AA's sixth entry (and his third highest-ranking title) on the chart, as well as Karol G's highest, at the time (until "TQG", a duet with Shakira, peaked at No. 7 in 2023). "China" subsequently peaked at No. 43 on August 17, 2019, becoming Daddy Yankee's seventh top 50 song on the Hot 100, as well as J Balvin's fifth, Ozuna's fourth, Anuel AA's third, and Karol G's first. The song also peaked at No. 27 on Streaming Songs and at No. 38 on Digital Songs. "China" also reached No. 37 on the Rolling Stone Top 100 Songs chart for the week ending August 8, 2019, with 52,600 sales and track-equivalent streams.

Internationally, "China" peaked at No. 1 in Argentina, Bolivia, Colombia, Mexico, Peru and Spain, and was also a Top 10 hit in Chile, Ecuador, El Salvador, Honduras, Nicaragua, Panama, Paraguay, Puerto Rico, and Venezuela. Additionally, the single peaked at No. 11 in both the Dominican Republic and Uruguay, and #12 in Guatemala. In non-Hispanophone countries in Europe, it peaked at No. 11 in Switzerland, #15 in Italy, #17 in Portugal, #33 in the Netherlands and #39 in Sweden. The track thus became both Anuel AA's and Karol G's highest-charting song in Switzerland, Sweden, and the Netherlands. On the radio airwaves, "China" was the second most-played song across Latin America for the week ending August 4, 2019, with 6,797 spins across the 19 countries measured by Monitor Latino.

== Music video ==
The music video for "China" was directed by Dominican filmmaker and director Marlon Peña, who had previously worked with Anuel AA on "Controla" (2019), with Daddy Yankee on eight clips including "Mayor Que Yo" (2005), "Shaky Shaky" (2016) and "Con Calma" (2019), and with both of them on "Adictiva" (2018) and the remix version of "Asesina" (2018), in which Ozuna also performs. J Balvin filmed separately, since he was the last one to record and the music video had been already shot in April 2019. The official music video on YouTube was released on Anuel AA's channel on July 19, 2019. As of September 2026, it has received over 2.3 billion views on YouTube.

== Charts ==
=== Weekly charts ===
Weekly chart performance for "China"
Chart (2019–20)	Peak position
Argentina (Argentina Hot 100)	1
Austria (Ö3 Austria Top 40)	67
Belgium (Ultratip Bubbling Under Flanders)	4
Belgium (Ultratip Bubbling Under Wallonia)	7
Bolivia (Monitor Latino)	1
Brazil (Top 100 Brasil)	95
Canada Hot 100 (Billboard)	77
Chile (Monitor Latino)	1
Colombia (National-Report)	1
Colombia (Monitor Latino)	1
Cuban Airplay Singles	3
Dominican Republic (Monitor Latino)	11
Dominican Republic (SODINPRO)	2
Ecuador (Monitor Latino)	4
El Salvador (Monitor Latino)	3
France (SNEP)	47
Germany (GfK)	50
Guatemala (Monitor Latino)	12
Honduras (Monitor Latino)	2
Hungary (Single Top 40)	28
Ireland (IRMA)	94
Italy (FIMI)	15
Lithuania (AGATA)	59
Mexico (Billboard Mexican Airplay)	1
Mexico (Monitor Latino)	1
Netherlands (Dutch Top 40)	33
Netherlands (Single Top 100)	27
Nicaragua (Monitor Latino)	2
Panama (Monitor Latino)	4
Paraguay (Monitor Latino)	7
Peru (Monitor Latino)	1
Portugal (AFP)	17
Puerto Rico (Monitor Latino)	2
Slovakia Singles Digital (ČNS IFPI)	78
Spain (PROMUSICAE)	1
Sweden (Sverigetopplistan)	39
Switzerland (Schweizer Hitparade)	10
Uruguay (Monitor Latino)	11
US Billboard Hot 100	43
US Hot Latin Songs (Billboard)	1
US Latin Airplay (Billboard)	1
US Latin Rhythm Airplay (Billboard)	1
US Rolling Stone Top 100	37
Venezuela (Monitor Latino)	2

=== Year-end charts ===
2019 year-end chart performance for "China"
Chart (2019)	Position
Argentina Airplay (Monitor Latino)	48
Bolivia Airplay (Monitor Latino)	6
Chile Airplay (Monitor Latino)	19
Colombia Airplay (Monitor Latino)	21
Colombia Streaming (Monitor Latino)	12
Costa Rica Airplay (Monitor Latino)	23
Costa Rica Streaming (Monitor Latino)	38
Dominican Republic Airplay (Monitor Latino)	23
Dominican Republic Streaming (Monitor Latino)	11
Ecuador Airplay (Monitor Latino)	16
Ecuador Streaming (Monitor Latino)	13
El Salvador Airplay (Monitor Latino)	11
Guatemala Airplay (Monitor Latino)	29
Guatemala Streaming (Monitor Latino)	12
Honduras Airplay (Monitor Latino)	11
Nicaragua Airplay (Monitor Latino)	8
Italy (FIMI)	71
Latin America Airplay (Monitor Latino)	13
Mexico Streaming (Monitor Latino)	94
Panama Airplay (Monitor Latino)	23
Paraguay Airplay (Monitor Latino)	21
Peru Airplay (Monitor Latino)	15
Peru Streaming (Monitor Latino)	12
Puerto Rica Airplay (Monitor Latino)	22
Puerto Rica Streaming (Monitor Latino)	25
Portugal (AFP)	113
Spain (PROMUSICAE)	4
Switzerland (Schweizer Hitparade)	57
Uruguay Airplay (Monitor Latino)	21
US Hot Latin Songs (Billboard)	12
US Latin Airplay (Monitor Latino)	88
US Latin Streaming (Monitor Latino)	36
Venezuela Airplay (Monitor Latino)	12

2020 year-end chart performance for "China"
Chart (2020)	Position
Argentina Airplay (Monitor Latino)	63
Bolivia Airplay (Monitor Latino)	22
Chile Airplay (Monitor Latino)	10
Colombia Airplay (Monitor Latino)	48
Colombia Streaming (Monitor Latino)	39
Costa Rica Airplay (Monitor Latino)	57
Costa Rica Streaming (Monitor Latino)	71
Dominican Republic Streaming (Monitor Latino)	91
Ecuador Airplay (Monitor Latino)	18
Ecuador Streaming (Monitor Latino)	31
El Salvador Airplay (Monitor Latino)	25
El Salvador Streaming (Monitor Latino)	29
Guatemala Airplay (Monitor Latino)	32
Guatemala Streaming (Monitor Latino)	22
Honduras Airplay (Monitor Latino)	43
Latin America Airplay (Monitor Latino)	36
Latin America Streaming (Monitor Latino)	47
Nicaragua Airplay (Monitor Latino)	26
Paraguay Airplay (Monitor Latino)	39
Peru Airplay (Monitor Latino)	40
Peru Streaming (Monitor Latino)	39
Spain (PROMUSICAE)	36
US Hot Latin Songs (Billboard)	22
US Latin Streaming (Monitor Latino)	60
Venezuela Airplay (Monitor Latino)	49

== Certifications ==
Certifications and sales for "China"
Region	Certification	Certified units/sales
France (SNEP)	Gold	100,000^{‡}
Italy (FIMI)	2× Platinum	140,000^{‡}
Mexico (AMPROFON)	Diamond+2× Platinum+Gold	450,000^{‡}
Portugal (AFP)	Platinum	10,000^{‡}
Spain (Promusicae)	8× Platinum	480,000^{‡}
United States (RIAA)	Gold (Latin)	30,000^{‡}
^{‡} Sales+streaming figures based on certification alone.

== See also ==
- List of Billboard Hot Latin Songs and Latin Airplay number ones of 2019
