= List of Billboard Hot Latin Songs and Latin Airplay number ones of 2019 =

The Billboard Hot Latin Songs and Latin Airplay are charts that rank the best-performing Latin songs in the United States and are both published weekly by Billboard magazine. The Hot Latin Songs ranks the best-performing Spanish-language songs in the country based digital downloads, streaming, and airplay from all radio stations. The Latin Airplay chart ranks the most-played songs on Spanish-language radio stations in the United States.

== Chart history ==
Chart history
Issue date	Hot Latin Songs			Latin Airplay		
Issue date	Title	Artist(s)	Ref.	Title	Artist(s)	Ref.
January 5	"Taki Taki"	DJ Snake featuring Selena Gomez, Ozuna and Cardi B		"Mia"	Bad Bunny featuring Drake	
January 12	"Taki Taki"	DJ Snake featuring Selena Gomez, Ozuna and Cardi B		"Mia"	Bad Bunny featuring Drake	
January 19	"Taki Taki"	DJ Snake featuring Selena Gomez, Ozuna and Cardi B		"Mia"	Bad Bunny featuring Drake	
January 26	"Taki Taki"	DJ Snake featuring Selena Gomez, Ozuna and Cardi B		"Reggaetón en lo Oscuro"	Wisin & Yandel	
February 2	"Taki Taki"	DJ Snake featuring Selena Gomez, Ozuna and Cardi B		"Ella Quiere Beber"	Anuel AA and Romeo Santos	
February 9	"Mia"	Bad Bunny featuring Drake		"Mia"	Bad Bunny featuring Drake	
February 16	"Mia"	Bad Bunny featuring Drake		"Mia"	Bad Bunny featuring Drake	
February 23	"Mia"	Bad Bunny featuring Drake		"Imposible"	Luis Fonsi and Ozuna	
March 2	"Mia"	Bad Bunny featuring Drake		"Créeme"	Karol G and Maluma	
March 9	"Mia"	Bad Bunny featuring Drake		"Sola"	Manuel Turizo	
March 16	"Mia"	Bad Bunny featuring Drake		"Con Calma"	Daddy Yankee featuring Snow	
March 23	"Mia"	Bad Bunny featuring Drake		"Con Calma"	Daddy Yankee featuring Snow	
March 30	"Mia"	Bad Bunny featuring Drake		"Con Calma"	Daddy Yankee featuring Snow	
April 6	"Mia"	Bad Bunny featuring Drake		"Reggaetón"	J Balvin	
April 13	"Mia"	Bad Bunny featuring Drake		"Calma"	Pedro Capó and Farruko	
April 20	"Mia"	Bad Bunny featuring Drake		"Un Año"	Sebastián Yatra and Reik	
April 27	"Mia"	Bad Bunny featuring Drake		"Con Calma"	Daddy Yankee featuring Snow	
May 4	"Con Calma"	Daddy Yankee and Katy Perry featuring Snow		"Secreto"	Anuel AA and Karol G	
May 11	"Con Calma"	Daddy Yankee and Katy Perry featuring Snow		"Baila Baila Baila"	Ozuna, Daddy Yankee, J Balvin, Farruko and Anuel AA	
May 18	"Con Calma"	Daddy Yankee and Katy Perry featuring Snow		"Me Gusta"	Natti Natasha	
May 25	"Con Calma"	Daddy Yankee and Katy Perry featuring Snow		"Con Calma"	Daddy Yankee featuring Snow	
June 1	"Con Calma"	Daddy Yankee and Katy Perry featuring Snow		"Inmortal"	Aventura	
June 8	"Con Calma"	Daddy Yankee and Katy Perry featuring Snow		"HP"	Maluma	
June 15	"Con Calma"	Daddy Yankee and Katy Perry featuring Snow		"Con Calma"	Daddy Yankee featuring Snow	
June 22	"Con Calma"	Daddy Yankee and Katy Perry featuring Snow		"Con Calma"	Daddy Yankee featuring Snow	
June 29	"Con Calma"	Daddy Yankee and Katy Perry featuring Snow		"Con Calma"	Daddy Yankee featuring Snow	
July 6	"Con Calma"	Daddy Yankee and Katy Perry featuring Snow		"Aullando"	Wisin & Yandel and Romeo Santos	
July 13	"Con Calma"	Daddy Yankee and Katy Perry featuring Snow		"Soltera"	Lunay, Daddy Yankee, and Bad Bunny	
July 20	"Con Calma"	Daddy Yankee and Katy Perry featuring Snow		"Soltera"	Lunay, Daddy Yankee, and Bad Bunny	
July 27	"Con Calma"	Daddy Yankee and Katy Perry featuring Snow		"Te Robaré"	Nicky Jam and Ozuna	
August 3	"Con Calma"	Daddy Yankee and Katy Perry featuring Snow		"Callaíta"	Bad Bunny and Tainy	
August 10	"Otro Trago"	Sech, Darell, Nicky Jam, Ozuna and Anuel AA		"Qué Pretendes"	J Balvin and Bad Bunny	
August 17	"China"	Anuel AA, Daddy Yankee, Karol G, Ozuna and J Balvin		"Si Me Das Tu Amor"	Carlos Vives and Wisin	
August 24	"Otro Trago"	Sech, Darell, Nicky Jam, Ozuna and Anuel AA		"Qué Pretendes"	J Balvin and Bad Bunny	
August 31	"Otro Trago"	Sech, Darell, Nicky Jam, Ozuna and Anuel AA		"Otro Trago"	Sech, Darell, Nicky Jam, Ozuna and Anuel AA	
September 7	"China"	Anuel AA, Daddy Yankee, Karol G, Ozuna and J Balvin		"Te Soñé De Nuevo"	Ozuna	
September 14	"China"	Anuel AA, Daddy Yankee, Karol G, Ozuna and J Balvin		"No Lo Trates"	Pitbull, Natti Natasha and Daddy Yankee	
September 21	"China"	Anuel AA, Daddy Yankee, Karol G, Ozuna and J Balvin		"China"	Anuel AA, Daddy Yankee, Karol G, Ozuna and J Balvin	
September 28	"China"	Anuel AA, Daddy Yankee, Karol G, Ozuna and J Balvin		"Qué Pretendes"	J Balvin and Bad Bunny	
October 5	"China"	Anuel AA, Daddy Yankee, Karol G, Ozuna and J Balvin		"Runaway"	Sebastián Yatra, Daddy Yankee, and Natti Natasha featuring Jonas Brothers	
October 12	"China"	Anuel AA, Daddy Yankee, Karol G, Ozuna and J Balvin		"Si Supieras"	Daddy Yankee and Wisin & Yandel	
October 19	"China"	Anuel AA, Daddy Yankee, Karol G, Ozuna and J Balvin		"Date la Vuelta"	Luis Fonsi, Sebastián Yatra, and Nicky Jam	
October 26	"China"	Anuel AA, Daddy Yankee, Karol G, Ozuna and J Balvin		"China"	Anuel AA, Daddy Yankee, Karol G, Ozuna and J Balvin	
November 2	"China"	Anuel AA, Daddy Yankee, Karol G, Ozuna and J Balvin		"Loco Contigo"	DJ Snake, J Balvin, and Tyga	
November 9	"China"	Anuel AA, Daddy Yankee, Karol G, Ozuna and J Balvin		"Aventura"	Lunay, Ozuna and Anuel AA	
November 16	"China"	Anuel AA, Daddy Yankee, Karol G, Ozuna and J Balvin		"Bonita"	Juanes and Sebastián Yatra	
November 23	"Tusa"	Karol G and Nicki Minaj		"11 PM"	Maluma	
November 30	"La Canción"	J Balvin and Bad Bunny		"La Canción"	J Balvin and Bad Bunny	
December 7	"Vete"	Bad Bunny		"No Elegí Conocerte"	Banda Sinaloense MS de Sergio Lizárraga	
December 14	"Vete"	Bad Bunny		" Hasta Que Salga el Sol"	Ozuna	
December 21	"Vete"	Bad Bunny		"Que Tire Pa Lante"	Daddy Yankee	
December 28	"Vete"	Bad Bunny		"Yo x Ti, Tu x Mi"	Rosalía and Ozuna	

== Weeks at number one ==
=== Songs ===
Number of weeks	Song	Artist(s)
14	"Con Calma"	Daddy Yankee and Katy Perry featuring Snow
12	"Mia"	Bad Bunny featuring Drake
12	"China"	Anuel AA, Daddy Yankee, Karol G, Ozuna and J Balvin
5	"Taki Taki"	DJ Snake featuring Selena Gomez, Ozuna and Cardi B
4	"Vete"	Bad Bunny
3	"Otro Trago"	Sech, Darell, Nicky Jam, Ozuna and Anuel AA
1	"Tusa"	Karol G and Nicki Minaj
1	"La Canción"	J Balvin and Bad Bunny

=== Artists ===
Number of weeks	Artist	Number of songs
26	Daddy Yankee	2
20	Ozuna	3
17	Bad Bunny	3
15	Anuel AA	2
14	Katy Perry	1
14	Snow	1
13	Karol G	2
13	J Balvin	2
12	Drake	1
5	DJ Snake	1
5	Selena Gomez	1
5	Cardi B	1
3	Sech	1
3	Darell	1
3	Nicky Jam	1
1	Nicki Minaj	1
