= Colores =

Studio album by J Balvin
- Released: 19 March 2020
- Genre: Reggaeton
- Length: 28:52
- Language: Spanish; English
- Label: Universal Latin
- Producer: Sky Rompiendo; Afro Bros; Dee Mad; Diplo; DJ Snake; King Doudou; Ronny J

J Balvin chronology
| Oasis (2019) | Colores (2020) | José (2021) |

Singles from Colores
- 1. "Blanco" Released: 15 November 2019; 2. "Morado" Released: 9 January 2020; 3. "Rojo" Released: 27 February 2020; 4. "Amarillo" Released: 19 March 2020

Colores (English: Colors) is the fourth solo studio album (fifth overall) by Colombian reggaeton singer J Balvin, released on 19 March 2020 through Universal Latin. The album was produced by Sky Rompiendo. It was preceded by the singles "Blanco", "Morado" and "Rojo", with the latter being released the same day as the album pre-order. Each song on the album (except "Arcoiris") received a music video directed by Colin Tilley. "Amarillo" was released as the fourth single off Colores the same day as the album's release. At the 2020 Latin Grammy Awards, the album won the Latin Grammy for Best Urban Album.

== Background ==
The album's central concept is colors, with each track named after a color (except "Arcoiris", the Spanish term for rainbow). Balvin collaborated with the Japanese artist Takashi Murakami for the music videos and album and single artworks, which notably feature Murakami's flowers, as well as American clothing brand Guess on a capsule collection inspired by the album.

The album was announced at the end of January 2020.

== Critical reception ==
Professional ratings
Aggregate scores
| Source | Rating |
|---|---|
| Metacritic | 72/100 |
Review scores
| Source | Rating |
| AllMusic | 3.5/5 stars |
| Clash | 8/10 |
| Consequence of Sound | B |
| The Guardian | 3/5 stars |
| Pitchfork | 7.3/10 |
| Rolling Stone (US) | 3.5/5 stars |
| Tom Hull – on the Web | B+ |

Colores received generally positive reviews from critics. Alexis Petridis of The Guardian gave the album three out of five stars and stated that Colores "isn’t really interested in standing out by startling the listener, or reeling them in with novelty, but what Colores does have in profusion is a universal brand of pop smarts". Suzy Exposito of Rolling Stone awarded the album three and a half out of five stars, writing "Don’t let the Crayola motif fool you: Spanning 10 pigment-themed tracks, Colores is a sophisticated show of Balvin’s sonic palette". Thom Jurek of Allmusic said of the album, "There isn't much lyrical substance on Colores, and there doesn't need to be. It's a party record whose lyric flows are effortless and laid-back enough -- a Balvin trademark -- to attract listeners inside and outside musica urbano's big tent. The album's brevity adds depth and dimension to its direct, seductive, welcoming mix and garish presentation."

Lucas Villa of Consequence of Sound wrote of the album, "The brushstrokes he paints as a purveyor of perreo pop might not be as broad, but they’re far-reaching in highlighting the evolution and future of reggaeton music. Balvin remains a power player in the globalization of the #LatinoGang, and Colores continues to showcase his colorful flow and spirit as a beacon in the movement". Jenzia Burgos of Pitchfork called the album "earnest" but "slightly indulgent" and compared the visually-focused work to albums by Pharrell Williams and Kanye West, saying, "Now with his own seat at the table, J Balvin will no doubt sigue rompiendo." Ramy Abou-Setta of Clash called Colores "one of J Balvin’s strongest projects to date", and opined that the album "stays true to the reggaeton roots that J Balvin has built upon during the years of his influence on the Latino music scene. An energetic and vibrant project, that is exactly what the music scene needed in such an uncertain time".

== Commercial performance ==
The album debuted at number 32 on the US Billboard 200 and number 2 on the Top Latin Albums chart with first week sales of 24,000. The album eventually peaked at number 15 on Billboard 200.

== Track listing ==
Colores track listing
| No. | Title | Writer(s) | Producer(s) | Length |
|---|---|---|---|---|
| 1. | "Amarillo" | José Osorio; Alejandro Ramírez; William Grigahcine; Giordano Ashruf; Rashid Badloe; Ronaldo Hernandez | Sky Rompiendo; DJ Snake; Afro Bros | 2:37 |
| 2. | "Azul" | Osorio; Ramírez; Justin Quiles; René Cano; Michael Brun | Sky Rompiendo; Brun | 3:25 |
| 3. | "Rojo" | Osorio; Ramírez; Quiles; Luis Angel O'Neill; Taiko | Sky Rompiendo; Taiko | 2:30 |
| 4. | "Rosa" | Osorio; Ramírez; Cano; Hernández; Thomas Wesley; Bas van Daalen; Jasper Helderman; Kevyn Cruz | Diplo; Sky Rompiendo^{[v]} | 3:09 |
| 5. | "Morado" | Osorio; Ramírez | Sky Rompiendo | 3:20 |
| 6. | "Verde" (with Sky Rompiendo) | Osorio; Ramírez; Ronald Spence, Jr. | Sky Rompiendo; Ronny J | 2:22 |
| 7. | "Negro" | Osorio; Ramírez; Dee Mad; Keityn; King Doudou | Dee Mad; King Doudou; Sky Rompiendo^{[v]} | 3:02 |
| 8. | "Gris" | Osorio; Ramírez; Quiles; Cano; Brun | Sky Rompiendo | 2:56 |
| 9. | "Arcoiris" (featuring Mr Eazi) | Osorio; Ramírez; Brun; Oluwatosin Ajibade | Sky Rompiendo; Brun | 3:06 |
| 10. | "Blanco" | Osorio; Ramírez; Cano | Sky Rompiendo; Dee Mad | 2:25 |
| Total length: | | | | 28:52 |

Notes

- ^{^[v]} signifies a vocal producer
- In the initial announcement of the track list, "Rosa" was listed as "Rosado".

Sample credits

- "Amarillo" contains a sample of "Angela", as written and performed by Saïan Supa Crew.

== Charts ==
=== Weekly charts ===
Weekly chart performance for Colores
| Chart (2020) | Peak position |
|---|---|
| Austrian Albums (Ö3 Austria) | 35 |
| Belgian Albums (Ultratop Flanders) | 66 |
| Belgian Albums (Ultratop Wallonia) | 52 |
| Canadian Albums (Billboard) | 35 |
| Dutch Albums (Album Top 100) | 34 |
| French Albums (SNEP) | 36 |
| German Albums (Offizielle Top 100) | 56 |
| Italian Albums (FIMI) | 10 |
| Mexican Albums (AMPROFON) | 4 |
| Portuguese Albums (AFP) | 8 |
| Spanish Albums (Promusicae) | 2 |
| Swedish Albums (Sverigetopplistan) | 31 |
| Swiss Albums (Schweizer Hitparade) | 9 |
| US Billboard 200 | 15 |
| US Top Latin Albums (Billboard) | 2 |
| US Latin Rhythm Albums (Billboard) | 2 |

=== Year-end charts ===
Year-end chart performance for Colores
| Chart (2020) | Position |
|---|---|
| Spanish Albums (PROMUSICAE) | 5 |
| US Top Latin Albums (Billboard) | 8 |
| Chart (2021) | Position |
| Spanish Albums (PROMUSICAE) | 46 |
| US Top Latin Albums (Billboard) | 24 |

== Certifications ==
Certifications for Colores
| Region | Certification | Certified units/sales |
|---|---|---|
| Chile (IFPI Chile) | 3× Platinum | |
| Italy (FIMI) | Gold | 25,000^{‡} |
| Mexico (AMPROFON) | Gold | 30,000^{‡} |
| Spain (Promusicae) | Platinum | 40,000^{‡} |
| United States (RIAA) | Diamond (Latin) | 600,000^{‡} |
^{‡} Sales+streaming figures based on certification alone.
