= Cuidao por Ahí =

2019 single by J Balvin featuring Bad Bunny

Single by J Balvin and Bad Bunny

from the album Oasis
- Language: Spanish
- English title: "Careful Around There"
- Released: 23 August 2019
- Genre: Reggaeton
- Length: 4:10
- Label: Universal Latino
- Songwriters: José Osorio; Benito Martinez; Alejandro Ramirez; Jose Arroyo
- Producer: Tainy

J Balvin singles chronology
"Yo Le Llego" (2019)	"Cuidao por Ahí" (2019)	"Indeciso" (2019)

Bad Bunny singles chronology
"Subimos de Rango" (2019)	"Cuidao por Ahí" (2019)	"Soy El Diablo (Remix)" (2019)

Music video
- "Cuidao por Ahí" on YouTube

"Cuidao por Ahí" (stylized in uppercase; transl. "Careful Around There") is a song by Colombian singer J Balvin and Puerto Rican rapper Bad Bunny from their collaborative album Oasis (2019). The song was released on 23 August 2019 as the fourth single from the project. Billboard magazine ranked it as the 33rd best song of 2019.

== Composition ==
The song contains a "menacing, sometimes disturbing beat", with J Balvin leading the opening lines, "chanting and singing in a register far lower than usual", followed by Bad Bunny's "higher voice". Billboard called the song a "musical switch whose success underscores how seamlessly these two work together", and asserted that if Bad Bunny is the "bad guy" in Oasis, then "Cuidao por Ahí" is a role reversal.

== Commercial performance ==
Like the rest of the songs of Oasis, "Cuidao por Ahí" managed to chart on the Billboard Hot Latin Songs chart, peaking at number 28.

== Music video ==
The music video for "Cuidao por Ahí" was released on 23 August 2019 and was directed by Colin Tilley. Its odd imagery and direction was noted by various journalists.

== Charts ==
Chart (2019)	Peak position
Argentina (Argentina Hot 100)	60
Spain (PROMUSICAE)	61
US Hot Latin Songs (Billboard)	28

== Certifications ==
Region	Certification	Certified units/sales
United States (RIAA)	Gold (Latin)	30,000^{‡}
^{‡} Sales+streaming figures based on certification alone.
