= Los Campeones del Pueblo "The Big Leagues" =

Studio album by Wisin & Yandel
- Released: December 14, 2018
- Genre: Reggaeton; Latin trap
- Length: 52:04
- Language: Spanish
- Label: Sony Latin
- Producer: Wisin & Yandel; Los Legendarios; Jumbo; Tainy; Chris Jedi; Gaby Music; DJ Luian; Mambo Kingz; Hydro; Sharo Towers; Dímelo Flow

Wisin & Yandel chronology
Líderes (2012)	Los Campeones del Pueblo "The Big Leagues" (2018)	La Última Misión (2022)

Singles from Los Campeones del Pueblo "The Big Leagues"
- 1. "Reggaetón en lo Oscuro" Released: October 25, 2018; 2. "Callao" Released: December 7, 2018; 3. "La Luz" Released: December 14, 2018; 4. "Aullando" Released: February 14, 2019

Los Campeones del Pueblo "The Big Leagues" is the ninth studio album by Puerto Rican duo Wisin & Yandel, released on December 14, 2018, by Sony Music Latin.

== Background ==
After a five-year hiatus that began in 2013, during which Wisin and Yandel developed solo careers, they confirmed the recording of new music in February 2018. During the 14th Premios Juventud on July 6, 2017, Wisin told Billboard that "something big [was] going to happen with Wisin & Yandel." Between September 2017 and February 2018, they released the singles "Como Antes" for Yandel's album Update, "Todo Comienza En La Disco" with Daddy Yankee for Wisin's Victory, and Ricky Martin's "Fiebre". All three reached number one on the US Latin Airplay charts.

On August 6, 2018, Wisin & Yandel announced that their upcoming album would be released during the late 2018, and added that Puerto Rican singer Ozuna and American singer Romeo Santos were among the featured acts. Between November 30 and December 9, 2018, the duo performed a record-breaking eight consecutive concerts at the José Miguel Agrelot Coliseum in Puerto Rico, which were part of their Como Antes Tour, with a total attendance of more than 100,000 spectators. They also broke the records for most sold-out shows at the venue, with 25, as well as the highest number of tickets sold, with 312,000.

Yandel said in December 2018 that he suggested Wisin to make a record with a similar style to their 2005 release Pa'l Mundo, which has been described as their breakthrough work and is the 20th best-selling Latin album in the United States as of October 2017. He stated that he wanted to "make an album with a lot of reggaeton like [they] used to do before." Wisin expressed that "there is a great need for that sound by Daddy Yankee, Luny Tunes' Más Flow, and DJ Blass" and added that that was the "flavour" they wanted to bring with the album.

Los Campeones del Pueblo was conceived as the original title, but Yandel suggested to add The Big Leagues because none of their previous works contained English-language titles, explaining that he did not count their 2003 album Mi Vida... My Life due to being a "different project" that included a few unpublished songs in a 25-track list. Ozuna's single "Quiero Más", released on his album Aura in August 2018, was originally recorded for Los Campeones del Pueblo: The Big Leagues. In an interview with Puerto Rican-based news website Rapetón.com in September 2018, Wisin told that Ozuna liked "Quiero Más" after listening to it during a recording session and they gave it to him. At the time of that interview, Wisin & Yandel had finished 12 of the album's 14 tracks. The album's track list was confirmed by Wisin through an Instagram post on November 10, 2018, while the release date was announced on November 30, 2018.

It was recorded in Wisin & Yandel's native Cayey in Puerto Rico and Miami in the United States. The earliest known recording from the album is a 15-second preview of the sixth track "Tú Tienes", published on September 15, 2016, on Wisin's official Instagram account. According to Instagram posts by both Wisin and Yandel, the tracks "La Luz" featuring Maluma and "Deseo" featuring Zion & Lennox were recorded on July 17 and July 19, 2018, respectively.

== Release ==
Los Campeones del Pueblo: The Big Leagues was released on December 14, 2018, six years after the duo's last studio album, Líderes. In order to promote the album in the United States, radio operator Spanish Broadcasting System premiered it in its entirety on five tropical and urban stations, including Mega 97.9 in New York and El Zol 106.7 in Miami, with Wisin & Yandel as DJs. In the week ending on December 29, the record debuted at number two on the US Top Latin Albums chart and at number 190 on the Billboard 200. It ranked within the top 10 of Top Latin Albums for seven weeks and remained on the Billboard 200 for one week. Los Campeones del Pueblo: The Big Leagues topped the Latin Albums Sales chart for one week and left the list after five weeks. On February 8, 2019, the record received a gold (Latin) certification by the Recording Industry Association of America (RIAA) for over 30,000 album-equivalent units in the United States. It received a platinum (Latin) certification in June, for double the amount and 4× Platinum in 2022. Internationally, the album peaked at number seven on the Spanish Streaming Albums chart on its debut on December 20, 2018.

=== Singles ===
Four of the album's 14 tracks were released as singles. The lead single, "Reggaetón En Lo Oscuro", was released on October 25, 2018, and peaked at number 18 on the US Hot Latin Songs chart on January 26, 2019. That same week, the track garnered Wisin & Yandel their 12th number-one on the Latin Airplay list and the first one as lead acts since their 2012 song "Algo Me Gusta de Ti". The single received a double platinum (Latin) certification by the Recording Industry Association of America on February 8, 2019, for units of over 120,000 sales plus track-equivalent streams. It has also peaked at number one on the duo's native Puerto Rico on January 13, 2019. Internationally, it reached number 10 in Honduras, number 11 in Chile, number 16 in Venezuela, number 39 in Argentina, and number 59 in Spain. The song has also received a platinum certification by the Chilean branch of the International Federation of the Phonographic Industry (IFPI) for units of over 12 million streams in Chile.

The second single, "Callao", was released on December 7, 2018 and peaked at number 44 on the US Hot Latin Songs chart, at number 93 in Spain, and at number 94 in Argentina. The third single, "La Luz", was released on December 14, 2018, and peaked at number nine on the US Latin Digital Songs list on December 29, 2018. "Aullando" was released as the fourth single on Valentine's Day on February 14, 2019 and peaked at number 19 on Hot Latin Songs and at number 23 on Tropical Songs in the United States. Internationally, it reached number eight in El Salvador and Venezuela, number nine in the Dominican Republic, number 37 in Argentina, and number 62 in Spain.

== Critical reception ==
Thom Jurek of AllMusic stated that the release of the album is "great news for fans of one of reggaeton's longest reigning outfits," and described it as a "club-friendly groove and beat orgy." Apple Music's editors have stated that the album "finds [Wisin & Yandel] knee-deep in the kind of classic, big-synth anthems that took them to the forefront of reggaeton's first explosion." They also added that "there is no shortage of heavy-hitting dembow riddims and anthemic vocals," and concluded by writing that "it is a fully formed perreo function from beginning to end." Billboard's critics ranked it the 18th best Latin album of 2018, and Leila Cobo described it as "old-school reggaeton, hard hitting club bangers that make no apologies," and referred to the guest acts as "a Hall of Fame museum of reggaeton."

Los Campeones del Pueblo: The Big Leagues has a pending nomination for a Tu Música Urbana Award for Album of the Year for the 1st Tu Música Urbana Awards, while the lead single, "Reggaeton En Lo Oscuro", has a pending nomination for Song of the Year – Duo or Group.

== Track listing ==
No.	Title	Writer(s)	Producer(s)	Length
1.	"Veo Veo"	Juan Morera; Llandel Veguilla; Christian Linares; Eduardo Vargas; Víctor Viera	Jumbo; Wisin & Yandel	4:05
2.	"Reggaetón en lo Oscuro"	J. Morera; L. Veguilla; Luis O'Neill; José Torres; V. Viera	Jumbo; Wisin & Yandel	3:28
3.	"Callao" (featuring Ozuna)	J. Morera; L. Veguilla; Juan Ozuna; C. Linares; Marcos Ramírez; Vicente Saavedra; J. Torres; Víctor Torres; V. Viera	Los Legendarios; Wisin & Yandel	3:39
4.	"Aullando" (featuring Romeo Santos)	J. Morera; L. Veguilla; Anthony Santos; Descemer Bueno; Silverio Lozada; Carlos Ortíz; Juan Rivera; Ender Thomas	Chris Jeday; Gaby Music; Wisin & Yandel	3:46
5.	"Guaya"	J. Morera; L. Veguilla; L. O'Neill; V. Viera	Jumbo; Wisin & Yandel	3:43
6.	"Tú Tienes"	J. Morera; L. Veguilla; M. Ramírez; J. Torres; V. Torres	Los Legendarios; Wisin & Yandel	3:46
7.	"Dame Algo" (featuring Bad Bunny)	J. Morera; L. Veguilla; Benito Martínez; Marco Masis	Tainy; Wisin & Yandel	3:57
8.	"La Luz" (featuring Maluma)	J. Morera; L. Veguilla; Juan Londoño; Edgar Barrera; Kevin Jiménez; Bryan Lezcano; M. Ramírez; Stiven Rojas; V. Torres	Los Legendarios; Wisin & Yandel	3:45
9.	"Me Dañas la Mente"	J. Morera; L. Veguilla; Francis Díaz; Luian Malavé; Kedin Maysonet; Elvin Peña; Henry Pulman; Edgar Semper; Xavier Semper	DJ Luian; Mambo Kingz; Hydro; Wisin & Yandel	3:30
10.	"Mi Intención" (featuring Miky Woodz)	J. Morera; L. Veguilla; Miguel Rodríguez; C. Linares; M. Ramírez; V. Torres	Los Legendarios; Wisin & Yandel	4:10
11.	"Te Dije Que Iba a Pasar"	J. Morera; L. Veguilla; C. Linares; M. Ramírez; V. Torres	Los Legendarios; Wisin & Yandel	3:08
12.	"Deseo" (featuring Zion & Lennox)	J. Morera; L. Veguilla; Felix Ortíz; Gabriel Pizarro; C. Linares; M. Ramírez; J. Torres; V. Torres	Los Legendarios; Wisin & Yandel	4:01
13.	"Recuerdo"	J. Morera; L. Veguilla; C. Linares; M. Masis; Justin Quiles	Tainy; Wisin & Yandel	3:12
14.	"Ojalá" (featuring Farruko)	J. Morera; L. Veguilla; Carlos Reyes; Jesús Benítez; Franklin Martínez; Marcos Pérez; Jorge Valdés	Sharo Towers; Dímelo Flow; Wisin & Yandel	3:54
Total length:				52:04

== Personnel ==
Credits adapted from Tidal.

- Edgar Barrera – songwriting (8)
- Benny Benni – songwriting (14)
- Jamal Berry – assistant engineer (1–6, 8–14)
- Bad Bunny – vocals, songwriting (7)
- Descemer Bueno – songwriting (4)
- Miguel Correa – assistant engineer (1–3, 5, 7–8, 12–13)
- Francis Díaz – songwriting (9)
- Earcandy – recording engineer (1–3, 5, 7–8, 10, 12–13), mixing (1, 3, 5, 7, 12–13)
- Farruko – vocals, songwriting (14)
- Mike Fuller – mastering (all)
- Dímelo Flow – songwriting, producer (14)
- Laura García – assistant engineer (4, 6, 9, 11, 14)
- Gocho – songwriting (2, 6, 12)
- Hyde – recording engineer (1–3, 5–14), mixing (8, 10–11, 14)
- Hydro – producer (9)
- Chris Jeday – songwriting (4), producer (4)
- Jumbo – songwriting, producer (1–2, 5)
- Mambo Kingz – songwriting, producers (9)
- William Knauft – assistant engineer (4, 6, 9, 11, 14)
- Los Legendarios – songwriting, producers (2, 6, 8, 10–12)
- Christian Linares – songwriting (1–2, 8, 10–13)
- Silverio Lozada – songwriting (4)
- DJ Luian – songwriting, producer (9)
- Maluma – vocals, songwriting (8)
- Franklin Martínez – songwriting (14)
- Kedin Maysonet – songwriting (9)
- Gaby Music – songwriting (4), producer (4), recording engineer (4, 10), mixing (2, 4)
- O'Neill – songwriting (2, 5)
- Ozuna – vocals, songwriting (3)
- Elvin Peña – songwriting (9)
- Henry Pulman – songwriting (9)
- Justin Quiles – songwriting (13)
- The Rudeboyz – songwriting (8)
- Vicente Saavedra – songwriting (2)
- Romeo Santos – vocals, songwriting (4)
- Miky La Sensa – songwriting (8)
- Tainy – songwriting, producer (7, 13)
- Ender Thomas – songwriting (4)
- Sharo Towers – songwriting, producer (14)
- Eduardo Vargas – songwriting (1)
- Nick Valentin – assistant engineer (4, 6, 9, 11, 14)
- Wisin & Yandel – vocals, songwriting, producers (all)
- Miky Woodz – vocals, songwriting (10)
- Zion & Lennox – vocals, songwriting (12)

== Charts ==
=== Weekly charts ===
Chart (2018)	Peak position
Spanish Albums (PROMUSICAE)	44
Spanish Streaming Albums (PROMUSICAE)	7
US Billboard 200	190
US Top Latin Albums (Billboard)	2
US Latin Rhythm Albums (Billboard)	2

=== Year-end charts ===
Chart (2019)	Position
US Top Latin Albums (Billboard)	20
Chart (2020)	Position
US Top Latin Albums (Billboard)	86

== Certifications ==
Region	Certification	Certified units/sales
Mexico (AMPROFON)	Platinum	60,000^{‡}
United States (RIAA)	4× Platinum (Latin)	240,000^{‡}
^{‡} Sales+streaming figures based on certification alone.
