= Blanco (song) =

Single by J Balvin

from the album Colores
- Language: Spanish
- English title: "White"
- Released: 15 November 2019
- Genre: Reggaeton
- Length: 3:25
- Label: Universal Latin
- Songwriters: José Osorio; Alejandro Ramírez; René Cano
- Producer: Sky Rompiendo

J Balvin singles chronology
"Ritmo (Bad Boys for Life)" (2019)	"Blanco" (2019)	"Morado" (2020)

Music video
- "Blanco" on YouTube

"Blanco" is a song by Colombian singer J Balvin. It was released as the lead single from his studio album Colores on November 15, 2019. On Billboard's Hot Latin Songs chart, it peaked at number 18. The song was certified double platinum in Mexico, and platinum in Spain and the United States.

== Background and composition ==
The track premiered on February 27, 2020, as the first anteroom of the album Colores. The song was written by the singer with Alejandro Ramírez and René Claro, a beat is present in the short-lived song, as well as a catchy lyrics. It was carried out under the production of Sky Rompiendo.

== Music video ==
The music video for "Blanco" premiered on November 15, 2019, and was directed by Colin Tilley. Takashi Murakami was in charge of art and visuals. In the futuristic audiovisual material the white color predominates.

== Commercial performance ==
Like the rest of the songs from Colores, it managed to appear on the Billboard Hot Latin Songs chart, peaking at number eighteen. In addition, it was certified platinum in that country. In Mexico, the single appeared at number thirty-four on Billboard's Airplay chart, and got the double platinum record.

== Charts ==
=== Weekly charts ===
Weekly chart performance for "Blanco"
Chart (2020)	Peak position
Argentina (Argentina Hot 100)	18
Colombia (National-Report)	1
Mexico (Billboard Mexican Airplay)	34
Spain (PROMUSICAE)	7
US Hot Latin Songs (Billboard)	18
US Latin Airplay (Billboard)	1
US Latin Rhythm Airplay (Billboard)	1

=== Year-end charts ===
2020 year-end chart performance for "Blanco"
Chart (2020)	Peak position
Spain (PROMUSICAE)	48

== Certifications ==
Certifications for "Blanco"
Region	Certification	Certified units/sales
Spain (Promusicae)	2× Platinum	80,000^{‡}
Mexico (AMPROFON)	2× Platinum	120,000^{‡}
United States (RIAA)	Platinum (Latin)	60,000^{‡}
^{‡} Sales+streaming figures based on certification alone.

== See also ==
- List of Billboard number-one Latin songs of 2020
