= Amarillo (J Balvin song) =

Single by J Balvin

from the album Colores
- Language: Spanish
- English title: "Yellow"
- Released: 19 March 2020
- Length: 2:37
- Label: Universal Latin
- Songwriters: José Osorio; Alejandro Ramírez; Afro Bros; William Grigahcine; Ronald Hernández
- Producers: DJ Snake; Sky Rompiendo

J Balvin singles chronology
"Rojo" (2020)	"Amarillo" (2020)	"Gris" (2020)

Music video
- "Bad Habits" on YouTube

"Amarillo" is a song by Colombian singer J Balvin. It was released on 19 March 2020 as the fourth single from his studio album Colores.

== Background and release ==
On 16 February 2020, Balvin announced the track along with the album through his social media. Alongside the publication, he shared a preview of the music video for "Amarillo", which shows the singer in yellow and orange clothes and hair. The track premiered on 19 March 2020, the same day he premiered from his fourth studio album Colores. The song served as the fourth single of the album.

== Composition ==
The original track is Angela by Saïan Supa Crew beatboxing intro by sly Johnson aka sly the mic Buddah

The song was written by the singer alongside Alejandro Ramírez, Afro Bros, William Grigachcine and Ronald Hernandez was performed under the production of Sky Rompiendo and DJ Snake.

In an interview for Apple Music, Balvin commented that "Amarillo is a very energetic song and is ready for nightclubs. A lot of people know about J Balvin, but few know about José, so it's the first song on the album, because as soon as they hear it, I want them to feel the color and power of the song."

== Music video ==
The music video for "Amarillo" premiered on 19 March 2020 and was directed by Colin Tilley.

== Charts ==
=== Weekly charts ===
Chart performance for "Amarillo"
Chart (2020)	Peak position
Argentina (Argentina Hot 100)	59
Colombia (National-Report)	35
France (SNEP)	148
Italy (FIMI)	71
Spain (PROMUSICAE)	1
Switzerland (Schweizer Hitparade)	44
US Bubbling Under Hot 100 (Billboard)	7
US Hot Latin Songs (Billboard)	8

=== Year-end charts ===
2020 year-end chart performance for "Amarillo"
Chart (2020)	Position
Spain (PROMUSICAE)	27

== Certifications ==
Certifications for "Amarillo"
Region	Certification	Certified units/sales
France (SNEP)	Gold	100,000^{‡}
Spain (Promusicae)	2× Platinum	80,000^{‡}
United States (RIAA)	3× Platinum (Latin)	180,000^{‡}
^{‡} Sales+streaming figures based on certification alone.
