= Yo Le Llego =

2019 single by J Balvin featuring Bad Bunny

Single by J Balvin and Bad Bunny

from the album Oasis
- Language: Spanish
- English title: "I'll Be There"
- Released: 9 August 2019
- Genre: Latin trap
- Length: 4:10
- Label: Universal Latino
- Songwriters: José Osorio; Benito Martinez; Alejandro Ramirez; José Arroyo
- Producers: Tainy; Albert Hype

J Balvin singles chronology
"La Canción" (2019)	"Yo Le Llego" (2019)	"Cuidao por Ahí" (2019)

Bad Bunny singles chronology
"Kemba Walker" (2019)	"Yo Le Llego" (2019)	"Subimos de Rango" (2019)

Music video
- "Yo Le Llego" on YouTube

"Yo Le Llego" (stylized in uppercase; transl. "I'll Be There") is a song by Colombian singer J Balvin and Puerto Rican rapper Bad Bunny from their collaborative album Oasis (2019). The song was released on 9 August 2019 as the third single from the project.

== Chart performance ==
Like the rest of the songs of Oasis, "Yo Le Llego" managed to chart on the Billboard Hot Latin Songs chart, peaking at number 18.

== Music video ==
The music video for "Yo Le Llego" was released on 9 August 2019 and was directed by Colin Tilley. It was filmed in Old San Juan, Puerto Rico.

== Charts ==
Chart (2019)	Peak position
Spain (PROMUSICAE)	45
US Hot Latin Songs (Billboard)	18

== Certifications ==
Region	Certification	Certified units/sales
Spain (Promusicae)	Gold	30,000^{‡}
United States (RIAA)	Gold (Latin)	30,000^{‡}
^{‡} Sales+streaming figures based on certification alone.
