= Amor Genuino =

Single by Ozuna

from the album Nibiru
- Language: Spanish
- English title: "Genuine Love"
- Released: June 4, 2019
- Length: 2:59
- Label: VP; Dimelo VI; Sony Latin
- Songwriters: Freddie Omar Lugo; Xavier Semper; Edgar Semper; Luian Malavé; Joseph Negron Velez, Juan Carlos Ozuna Rosado; Héctor Ramos

Ozuna singles chronology
"Te Robaré" (2019)	"Amor Genuino" (2019)	"Te Soñé de Nuevo" (2019)

Audio video
- "Amor Genuino" on YouTube

"Amor Genuino" is a song by Puerto Rican singer Ozuna, released as the second single from his third studio album Nibiru on June 4, 2019. It debuted at number 92 on the US Billboard Hot 100.

== Composition ==
"Amor Genuino" is a piano ballad in which Ozuna asserts that while his judgement has often been "clouded", he has genuine love and intentions towards his lover.

== Critical reception ==
HotNewHipHop described the song as a "soft ballad" that "will have everyone in their feelings". Vibe said the track "puts a lovely twist on urbano ballads".

== Charts ==
=== Weekly charts ===
Chart (2019)	Peak position
Spain (PROMUSICAE)	31
US Billboard Hot 100	92
US Hot Latin Songs (Billboard)	8

=== Year-end charts ===
Chart (2019)	Position
US Hot Latin Songs (Billboard)	58

== Certifications ==
Certifications for "Gracias por Nada"
Region	Certification	Certified units/sales
Spain (Promusicae)	Gold	30,000^{‡}
^{‡} Sales+streaming figures based on certification alone.
