= Te Robaré (Nicky Jam song) =

Single by Nicky Jam and Ozuna

Single by Nicky Jam and Ozuna

from the album Íntimo
- Released: March 22, 2019
- Genre: Reggaeton
- Length: 3:23
- Label: Sony Latin
- Songwriters: Nick Rivera; Jan Carlos Ozuna; Juan G. Rivera; Carlos Ortiz; Juan Diego Medina; Johnatan Ballesteros; Vicente Saavedra; Nino Segarra
- Producers: Gaby Music; Chris Jedi

Nicky Jam singles chronology
"Back in the City" (2019)	"Te Robaré" (2019)	"Date La Vuelta" (2019)

Ozuna singles chronology
"Vacía Sin Mí" (2019)	"Te Robaré" (2019)	"Amor Genuino" (2019)

Music video
- "Te Robaré" on YouTube

"Te Robaré" is a song by American singer Nicky Jam and Puerto Rican singer Ozuna, released as a single by Sony Music Latin on March 22, 2019. The track was written by the two singers, Juan Diego Medina, Johnatan Ballesteros, Vicente Saavedra, Nino Segarra, and its producers Gaby Music and Chris Jedi. It is the second single of Nicky Jam's fifth studio album Íntimo.

== Chart performance ==
"Te Robaré" reached number one on the US Billboard Latin Airplay chart dated July 27, 2019, earning Nicky Jam and Ozuna their 10th and 11th number one's, respectively.

== Music video ==
The video, directed by Jessy Terrero, shows various women dancing and posing in front of various settings, such as phone booths and cars, while Nicky Jam and Ozuna are performing. The music video has over 500 million views on YouTube as of January 2020.

== Charts ==
=== Weekly charts ===
Chart (2019)	Peak position
Argentina (Argentina Hot 100)	7
Bolivia (Monitor Latino)	2
Chile (Monitor Latino)	2
Colombia (Monitor Latino)	3
Colombia (National-Report)	1
Honduras (Monitor Latino)	5
Italy (FIMI)	28
Panama (Monitor Latino)	13
Paraguay (Monitor Latino)	2
Puerto Rico (Monitor Latino)	7
Nicaragua (Monitor Latino)	5
Spain (PROMUSICAE)	7
Switzerland (Schweizer Hitparade)	28
US Billboard Hot 100	91
US Hot Latin Songs (Billboard)	6
US Latin Airplay (Billboard)	1
US Latin Rhythm Airplay (Billboard)	1
Uruguay (Monitor Latino)	1
Venezuela (Monitor Latino)	15
Venezuela (National-Report)	8

=== Year-end charts ===
Chart (2019)	Position
Italy (FIMI)	64
Portugal (AFP)	188
Spain (PROMUSICAE)	19
Switzerland (Schweizer Hitparade)	91
US Hot Latin Songs (Billboard)	15

== Certifications ==
Region	Certification	Certified units/sales
Brazil (Pro-Música Brasil)	Platinum	40,000^{‡}
France (SNEP)	Gold	100,000^{‡}
Italy (FIMI)	Platinum	50,000^{‡}
Mexico (AMPROFON)	Diamond+Gold	330,000^{‡}
Portugal (AFP)	Gold	5,000^{‡}
Spain (Promusicae)	3× Platinum	180,000^{‡}
Switzerland (IFPI Switzerland)	Gold	10,000^{‡}
United States (RIAA)	2× Diamond (Latin)	1,200,000^{‡}
^{‡} Sales+streaming figures based on certification alone.

== See also ==
- List of Billboard Argentina Hot 100 top-ten singles in 2019
- List of Billboard number-one Latin songs of 2019
