= Baila, Baila, Baila =

2019 single by Ozuna

Single by Ozuna

from the album Nibiru
- Language: Spanish
- English title: "Dance, Dance, Dance"
- Released: January 5, 2019
- Length: 2:38
- Label: VP; Dimelo VI; Sony Latin
- Songwriters: Vicente Saavedra; Juan Carlos Ozuna
- Producers: Mambo Kingz; DJ Luian; Jowny Boom Boom; Hydro

Ozuna singles chronology
"Quiero Más" (2018)	"Baila, Baila, Baila" (2019)	"Cama Vacía" (2019)

Music video
- "Baila Baila Baila" on YouTube

"Baila, Baila, Baila" (Spanish: "Dance, Dance, Dance") is a song by Puerto Rican singer Ozuna, released as the lead single on January 5, 2019, from his third studio album Nibiru. It was later remixed, first in a MamWali version with Ala Jaza and another version featuring Daddy Yankee, J Balvin, Farruko and Anuel AA, released on April 25. The latter remix helped the song reach new chart peaks in several countries, including number 69 on the US Billboard Hot 100. The single was certified platinum for moving one million units in United States alone.

== Composition ==
The song is about a woman who goes to a club and dances with her friends to forget a boyfriend that she broke up with.

== Remix ==
"Baila Baila Baila (Remix)"

Single by Ozuna featuring Daddy Yankee, Farruko, J Balvin and Anuel AA
- Released: April 25, 2019
- Length: 3:56
- Label: VP; Dimelo VI; Sony Latin
- Songwriters: Vicente Saavedra; Juan Carlos Ozuna
- Producers: Mambo Kingz; DJ Luian; Jowny Boom Boom; Hydro

Daddy Yankee singles chronology
"Con Calma" (2019)	"Baila Baila Baila (Remix)" (2019)	"Soltera (Remix)" (2019)

J Balvin singles chronology
"Mañana es too late" (2019)	"Baila Baila Baila (Remix)" (2019)	"Ven y Hazlo Tu" (2019)

Anuel AA singles chronology
"Controla" (2019)	"Baila Baila Baila (Remix)" (2019)	"Ven y Hazlo Tu" (2019)

Farruko singles chronology
"Calma (Remix)" (2019)	"Baila Baila Baila (Remix)" (2019)

Remix audio video
- "Baila Baila Baila (Remix)" on YouTube

Ozuna performed the song at the 2019 Billboard Latin Music Awards on April 25, accompanied by Daddy Yankee, J Balvin and Anuel AA.

== Charts ==
=== Weekly charts ===
Weekly chart performance for "Baila Baila Baila"
Chart (2019)	Peak position
Belgium (Ultratip Bubbling Under Flanders)	30
Belgium (Ultratip Bubbling Under Wallonia)	8
Chile (Monitor Latino)	9
Colombia (National-Report)	34
Costa Rica (Monitor Latino)	10
Ecuador (National-Report)	43
France (SNEP)	19
Germany (GfK)	92
Honduras (Monitor Latino)	5
Italy (FIMI)	9
Mexican Pop Airplay (Billboard)	32
Nicaragua (Monitor Latino)	14
Panama (Monitor Latino)	6
Paraguay (Monitor Latino)	16
Puerto Rico (Monitor Latino)	7
Spain (Promusicae)	2
Switzerland (Schweizer Hitparade)	14
Venezuela (Monitor Latino)	19

Weekly chart performance for "Baila Baila Baila (Remix version)"
Chart (2019)	Peak position
Argentina (Argentina Hot 100)	19
US Billboard Hot 100	69
US Hot Latin Songs (Billboard)	3
US Latin Airplay (Billboard)	1
US Latin Rhythm Airplay (Billboard)	1

Weekly chart performance for "Baila Baila Baila (Ala Jaza remix version)"
Chart (2019)	Peak position
Dominican Republic (Monitor Latino)	3

=== Year-end charts ===
Chart (2019)	Position
France (SNEP)	49
Italy (FIMI)	23
Spain (PROMUSICAE)	5
Switzerland (Schweizer Hitparade)	22
US Hot Latin Songs (Billboard)	11

== Certifications ==
Region	Certification	Certified units/sales
France (SNEP)	Gold	100,000^{‡}
Italy (FIMI)	3× Platinum	210,000^{‡}
Spain (Promusicae)	5× Platinum	200,000^{‡}
Spain (Promusicae) Remix version	Platinum	60,000^{‡}
United States (RIAA)	Platinum	1,000,000^{‡}
^{‡} Sales+streaming figures based on certification alone.

== See also ==
- List of Billboard number-one Latin songs of 2019
