= Si Supieras =

2019 single by Daddy Yankee and Wisin & Yandel

Single by Daddy Yankee and Wisin & Yandel

from the album El Disco Duro
- Language: Spanish
- English title: "If You Knew"
- Released: June 28, 2019
- Genre: Reggaeton
- Length: 4:01
- Label: El Cartel
- Songwriters: Ramón Ayala; Juan Luis Morera; Llandel Veguilla; Francisco Saldaña; Marco Masis; Rafael Pina; Juan Rivera; Eric Rodríguez
- Producers: Luny; Tainy; Predikador; Max Borghetti

Daddy Yankee singles chronology
"Runaway" (2019)	"Si Supieras" (2019)	"Instagram" (2019)

Wisin & Yandel singles chronology
"Guaya" (2019)	"Si Supieras" (2019)	"Chica Bombastic" (2019)

Music video
- "Si Supieras" on YouTube

"Si Supieras" (English: "If You Knew") is a song by Puerto Rican rapper and singer Daddy Yankee and Puerto Rican duo Wisin & Yandel, released on June 28, 2019 by El Cartel Records. The track was written by Daddy Yankee, Wisin, Yandel, Rafael "Raphy" Pina, Eric "Lobo" Rodríguez, Juan "Gaby Music" Rivera, Francisco "Luny" Saldaña, and Marco "Tainy" Masis, and was produced by Dominican producer Luny, panamanian producer Predikador, Dominican - Italian producer Max Borghetti and Puerto Rican producer Tainy.

== Background and release ==
"Si Supieras" was written by Daddy Yankee, Wisin, Yandel, Rafael "Raphy" Pina, Eric "Lobo" Rodríguez, Juan "Gaby Music" Rivera, Francisco "Luny" Saldaña, and Marco "Tainy" Masis, and was produced by Daddy Yankee's and Wisin & Yandel's longtime collaborators Luny and Tainy. Luny, as member of the Dominican production duo Luny Tunes, has worked with both acts on "Mayor Que Yo" (2005), "Noche de Entierro" (2006), and "Mayor Que Yo 3" (2015). He has also produced various songs by Daddy Yankee, including "Gasolina" (2004), "Lo Que Pasó, Pasó" (2004) and "Rompe" (2005), as well as the majority of Wisin & Yandel's album Pa'l Mundo (2005), including the singles "Rakata" and "Llamé Pa' Verte". Puerto Rican producer Tainy took part on the production of every studio album by Wisin & Yandel since Pa'l Mundo and won a Latin Grammy Award for Best Urban Song with them for "Abusadora" in 2009.

"Si Supieras" was announced by Daddy Yankee through social media on June 25, 2019, showing a brief trailer of the music video and posting that the song would be released on June 28. On June 27, Daddy Yankee posted a 45-second preview of the track featuring Yandel's vocals.

"Si Supieras" is the ninth collaboration between Daddy Yankee and Wisin & Yandel, following other singles including "No Me Dejes Solo" (2004), "Mayor Que Yo" (2005), "Noche de Entierro" (2006), "Mayor Que Yo 3" (2015), and "Todo Comienza en la Disco" (2018).

Wisin described "Si Supieras" as a romantic song, similar to "No Me Dejes Solo" from Daddy Yankee's album Barrio Fino. He stated that the track was recorded in response to "millions of petitions" from their fans on social media. Daddy Yankee referred to the collaboration as "gold school".

== Music video ==
The music video for "Si Supieras" was directed by Venezuelan director Nuno Gomes, who had previously worked with Daddy Yankee on "Andas En Mi Cabeza" (2016) and "La Rompe Corazones" (2017) and also with Wisin & Yandel on "Duele" (2019). The official music video on YouTube was released on Daddy Yankee's channel on June 28, 2019. It has received over eight million views as of June 30, 2019. The clip was nominated for a Latin American Music Award for Favorite Video at the 5th Latin American Music Awards.

== Credits and personnel ==
Credits adapted from Tidal.

- Eric Rodríguez "Lobo" – songwriting
- Marco Masis "Tainy" – songwriting, producer
- Rafael Pina – songwriting
- Juan Rivera "Gaby Music" – songwriting
- Francisco Saldaña "Luny" – songwriting, producer
- Wisin – songwriting, vocals
- Yandel – songwriting, vocals
- Daddy Yankee – songwriting, vocals

== Charts ==
=== Weekly charts ===
Weekly chart performance for "Si Supieras"
Chart (2019)	Peak position
Argentina (Argentina Hot 100)	23
Chile (Monitor Latino)	8
Colombia (National-Report)	88
El Salvador (Monitor Latino)	16
Honduras (Monitor Latino)	16
Paraguay (Monitor Latino)	18
Paraguay (SGP)	33
Puerto Rico (Monitor Latino)	1
Spain (PROMUSICAE)	44
US Hot Latin Songs (Billboard)	15
US Latin Airplay (Billboard)	1
US Latin Rhythm Airplay (Billboard)	1
Venezuela (Monitor Latino)	13

=== Year-end charts ===
2019 year-end chart performance for "Si Supieras"
Chart (2019)	Position
Chile Airplay (Monitor Latino)	74
Colombia Streaming (Monitor Latino)	99
El Salvador Airplay (Monitor Latino)	75
Guatemala Airplay (Monitor Latino)	70
Guatemala Streaming (Monitor Latino)	64
Honduras Airplay (Monitor Latino)	50
Puerto Rica Airplay (Monitor Latino)	8
Puerto Rica Streaming (Monitor Latino)	10
US Hot Latin Songs (Billboard)	46
US Latin Streaming (Monitor Latino)	59
Venezuela Airplay (Monitor Latino)	62

== Certifications ==
Certifications and sales for "Si Supieras"
Region	Certification	Certified units/sales
Spain (Promusicae)	Platinum	60,000^{‡}
United States (RIAA)	6× Platinum (Latin)	360,000^{‡}
^{‡} Sales+streaming figures based on certification alone.

== See also ==
- List of Billboard number-one Latin songs of 2019
