= Duele (Reik and Wisin & Yandel song) =

Single by Reik with Wisin & Yandel

from the album Ahora
- Released: March 20, 2019
- Genre: Reggaeton
- Length: 3:59
- Label: Sony Latin
- Songwriters: Julio Ramirez Eguia; Alfonso Flores Arocha; Ada Jaasiel Reyes Ávila; Roberto Valdéz Ramírez

Reik singles chronology
"Un año" (2019)	"Duele" (2019)	"Eres tu" (2019)

Wisin & Yandel singles chronology
"Aullando" (2019)	"Duele" (2019)	"Mi Intención" (2019)

"Duele" is a song by the Mexican band Reik in collaboration with the Puerto Rican reggaeton duo Wisin & Yandel. The song was released as the fourth single from Reik's sixth studio album Ahora.

== Charts ==
Chart (2019)	Peak position
Bolivia (Monitor Latino)	15
Colombia (National-Report)	2
Ecuador (National-Report)	10
Mexico (Monitor Latino)	16
Venezuela (National-Report)	15

== Certifications ==
Region	Certification	Certified units/sales
Mexico (AMPROFON)	Platinum+Gold	90,000^{‡}
United States (RIAA)	Platinum (Latin)	60,000^{‡}
^{‡} Sales+streaming figures based on certification alone.
