= Reggaetón en lo Oscuro =

2018 single by Wisin & Yandel

Single by Wisin & Yandel

from the album Los Campeones del Pueblo
- Language: Spanish
- English title: "Reggaetón in the Dark"
- Released: October 25, 2018
- Genre: Reggaeton
- Length: 3:28
- Label: Sony Latin
- Songwriters: Juan Luis Morera; Llandel Veguilla; Luis O'Neill; Víctor Viera; José Torres
- Producers: Wisin & Yandel; Jumbo

Wisin & Yandel singles chronology
"Fiebre" (2018)	"Reggaetón en lo Oscuro" (2018)	"Callao" (2018)

Music video
- "Reggaetón en lo Oscuro" on YouTube

"Reggaetón en lo Oscuro" is a song by Puerto Rican reggaeton duo Wisin & Yandel from their album, Los Campeones del Pueblo: The Big Leagues. They co-wrote the song with Luis O'Neill, José Torres, and Jumbo who also produced it with the duo. It was released by Sony Music Latin on October 25, 2018. The single was a commercial success across Latin America. The music video was shot in San Juan and released on October 30, 2018.

== Charts ==
=== Weekly charts ===
Chart (2018–19)	Peak position
Argentina (Argentina Hot 100)	39
Bolivia (Monitor Latino)	18
Chile (Monitor Latino)	10
Colombia (National-Report)	64
Ecuador (National-Report)	30
Honduras (Monitor Latino)	10
Puerto Rico (Monitor Latino)	1
Spain (PROMUSICAE)	59
US Hot Latin Songs (Billboard)	18
US Latin Airplay (Billboard)	1
US Latin Rhythm Airplay (Billboard)	1
Venezuela (National-Report)	16

=== Year-end charts ===
Chart (2019)	Position
US Hot Latin Songs (Billboard)	57

== Certifications ==
Region	Certification	Certified units/sales
Mexico (AMPROFON)	Platinum+Gold	90,000^{‡}
Spain (Promusicae)	Gold	30,000^{‡}
United States (RIAA)	6× Platinum (Latin)	360,000^{‡}
^{‡} Sales+streaming figures based on certification alone.

== See also ==
- List of Billboard number-one Latin songs of 2019
