= Aullando =

Song by Wisin & Yandel

Single by Wisin & Yandel with Romeo Santos

from the album Los Campeones del Pueblo: The Big Leagues
- Released: February 14, 2019
- Genre: Reggaeton
- Length: 3:46
- Label: Sony Latin
- Songwriters: Juan Morera; Llandel Veguilla; Anthony Santos; Descemer Bueno; Silverio Lozada; Carlos Ortíz; Juan Rivera; Ender Thomas
- Producers: Chris Jedi; Gaby Music; Wisin & Yandel

Wisin & Yandel singles chronology
| "Te Boté II" (2018) | "Aullando" (2019) | "Duele" (2019) |

Romeo Santos singles chronology
| "Ella Quiere Beber" (2018) | "Aullando" (2018) | "Inmortal" (2019) |

"Aullando" (English: "Howling") is the fourth single of the Puerto Rican duo Wisin & Yandel, alongside Dominican-American bachata singer Romeo Santos, from their album Los Campeones del Pueblo: The Big Leagues. The single was a massive success across Latin America.

== Music video ==
A music video was released on February 14, 2019, to support the single. It was directed by Dominican filmmaker Jessy Terrero, who had directed numerous videoclips for Wisin & Yandel in the past. The video was shot at El San Juan Hotel in Puerto Rico and stars Wisin, Yandel, and Romeo Santos. The video makes numerous references to werewolves as model Gallienne Nabila in a fur coat and bikini is transformed into a wolf while a full moon shines on the horizon. The music video has over 300 million views as of July 2019.

== Live performances ==
Wisin & Yandel and Romeo Santos performed "Aullando" at the 2019 Billboard Latin Music Awards on April 25, 2019.

== Charts ==
=== Weekly charts ===
| Chart (2019) | Peak position |
|---|---|
| Argentina (Argentina Hot 100) | 16 |
| Chile (Monitor Latino) | 14 |
| Colombia (Monitor Latino) | 4 |
| Colombia (National-Report) | 5 |
| Dominican Republic (Monitor Latino) | 4 |
| Ecuador (National-Report) | 25 |
| El Salvador (Monitor Latino) | 7 |
| Guatemala (Monitor Latino) | 13 |
| Honduras (Monitor Latino) | 16 |
| Mexico Airplay (Monitor Latino) | 7 |
| Nicaragua (Monitor Latino) | 11 |
| Paraguay (Monitor Latino) | 18 |
| Puerto Rico (Monitor Latino) | 1 |
| Spain (PROMUSICAE) | 24 |
| Uruguay (Monitor Latino) | 18 |
| US Bubbling Under Hot 100 (Billboard) | 6 |
| US Hot Latin Songs (Billboard) | 10 |
| US Latin Airplay (Billboard) | 1 |
| US Latin Rhythm Airplay (Billboard) | 1 |
| US Tropical Airplay (Billboard) | 1 |
| Venezuela (Monitor Latino) | 8 |

=== Year-end charts ===
| Chart (2019) | Position |
|---|---|
| El Salvador (Monitor Latino) | 6 |
| US Hot Latin Songs (Billboard) | 19 |

== Certifications ==
| Region | Certification | Certified units/sales |
|---|---|---|
| Italy (FIMI) | Gold | 25,000^{‡} |
| Mexico (AMPROFON) | Diamond+2× Platinum+Gold | 450,000^{‡} |
| Spain (Promusicae) | 2× Platinum | 120,000^{‡} |
| United States (RIAA) | 22× Platinum (Latin) | 1,320,000^{‡} |
^{‡} Sales+streaming figures based on certification alone.

== See also ==
- List of Billboard number-one Latin songs of 2019
