= La Canción =

2019 single by J Balvin and Bad Bunny

Single by J Balvin and Bad Bunny

from the album Oasis
- Language: Spanish
- English title: "The Song"
- Released: 2 August 2019
- Genre: Reggaeton
- Length: 4:02
- Label: Universal Latino
- Songwriters: José Osorio; Benito Martinez; Alejandro Ramirez; Jose Arroyo
- Producer: Nicael

J Balvin singles chronology
"China" (2019)	"La Canción" (2019)	"Yo Le Llego" (2019)

Bad Bunny singles chronology
"Qué Pretendes" (2019)	"La Canción" (2019)	"Bellacoso" (2019)

Music video
- "La Canción" on YouTube

"La Canción" (stylized in uppercase; transl. "The Song") is a song by Colombian singer J Balvin and Puerto Rican rapper Bad Bunny. The song was released on 2 August 2019, through Universal Music Latino, as the second single from their collaborative album Oasis (2019). It reached number one in Mexico and on the US Hot Latin Songs chart.

== Commercial performance ==
Like the rest of the songs of Oasis, "La Canción" managed to chart on the Billboard Hot Latin Songs chart, debuting at number 10. The song managed to top the Hot Latin Songs chart on the week of November 30, 2019, earning J Balvin and Bad Bunny their seventh and third number one singles on that chart, respectively. "La Canción" is the second single from Oasis to chart on the Billboard Hot 100, entering the chart at number 98 and later peaking at number 27.

== Music video ==
The music video for "La Canción" was released on 14 October 2019 and was directed by Colin Tilley. It was filmed within a club and its plot revolves around the disparity that occurs when a relationship ends. As of February 2026, it has received over 860 million views.

== Charts ==
=== Weekly charts ===
Chart (2019)	Peak position
Argentina (Argentina Hot 100)	16
Bolivia (Monitor Latino)	9
Colombia (National-Report)	36
Dominican Republic (SODINPRO)	3
Mexico (Monitor Latino)	1
Paraguay (Monitor Latino)	14
Paraguay (SGP)	31
Puerto Rico (Monitor Latino)	5
Spain (PROMUSICAE)	6
US Billboard Hot 100	84
US Hot Latin Songs (Billboard)	1
US Latin Airplay (Billboard)	1
US Latin Rhythm Airplay (Billboard)	1
US Rolling Stone Top 100	50

Chart (2022)	Peak position
Ecuador (Billboard)	21
Global 200 (Billboard)	163

Chart (2025–2026)	Peak position
Austria (Ö3 Austria Top 40)	59
Bolivia (Billboard)	8
Canada Hot 100 (Billboard)	39
Chile (Billboard)	18
Colombia Hot 100 (Billboard)	25
Costa Rica Streaming (FONOTICA)	15
Ecuador (Billboard)	8
France (SNEP)	138
Germany (GfK)	100
Greece International (IFPI)	12
Global 200 (Billboard)	15
Italy (FIMI)	64
Lithuania (AGATA)	59
Luxembourg (Billboard)	21
Mexico (Billboard)	13
Peru (Billboard)	9
Portugal (AFP)	10
Sweden Heatseeker (Sverigetopplistan)	7
Switzerland (Schweizer Hitparade)	17
US Billboard Hot 100	27
US Hot Latin Rhythm Songs (Billboard)	6

=== Year-end charts ===
Chart (2019)	Position
US Hot Latin Songs (Billboard)	17
US Latin by Audience (Monitor Latino)	100
Chart (2020)	Position
US Hot Latin Songs (Billboard)	16
Chart (2022)	Position
Global 200 (Billboard)	174

== Certifications ==
Region	Certification	Certified units/sales
Brazil (Pro-Música Brasil)	Platinum	40,000^{‡}
France (SNEP)	Platinum	200,000^{‡}
Italy (FIMI)	Platinum	100,000^{‡}
Portugal (AFP)	4× Platinum	100,000^{‡}
Spain (Promusicae)	6× Platinum	360,000^{‡}
United States (RIAA)	Platinum (Latin)	60,000^{‡}
Streaming
Greece (IFPI Greece)	Gold	1,000,000^{†}
^{‡} Sales+streaming figures based on certification alone.^{†} Streaming-only figures based on certification alone.

== Covers ==
On April 16, 2020, Maye released a cover of "La Canción" as a single.

In September 2022, British rock band Coldplay covered "La Canción" at their Bogotá, Colombia show of their Music of the Spheres World Tour.

== See also ==
- List of Billboard number-one Latin songs of 2019
