= Oasis (J Balvin and Bad Bunny album) =

2019 studio album by J Balvin and Bad Bunny

Studio album by J Balvin and Bad Bunny
- Released: June 28, 2019
- Recorded: 2017–2019
- Genres: Latin trap; reggaeton; hip hop
- Length: 31:03
- Language: Spanish
- Labels: Rimas; Universal Latino
- Producers: Sky; Tainy; HTM; Legendury Beatz; Albert Hype

J Balvin chronology
| Vibras (2018) | Oasis (2019) | Colores (2020) |

Bad Bunny chronology
| X 100pre (2018) | Oasis (2019) | YHLQMDLG (2020) |

Singles from Oasis
- 1. "Qué Pretendes" Released: June 28, 2019; 2. "La Canción" Released: August 2, 2019; 3. "Yo Le Llego" Released: August 9, 2019; 4. "Cuidao por Ahí" Released: August 23, 2019

Professional ratings
Aggregate scores
| Source | Rating |
|---|---|
| Metacritic | 79/100 |
Review scores
| Source | Rating |
| AllMusic | 3.5/5 stars |
| Pitchfork | 8/10 |

Oasis (stylized in all caps) is a collaborative album by Colombian singer J Balvin and Puerto Rican rapper Bad Bunny, released on June 28, 2019. The pair previously collaborated on Cardi B's 2018 single "I Like It". "Qué Pretendes" was released as the lead single with a video alongside the album, being later followed by "La Canción", "Yo Le Llego", and "Cuidao por Ahí".

The album debuted at number 9 on the US Billboard 200 and number 1 on the Top Latin Albums and Latin Rhythm Albums chart with first week sales of 36,000.

== Background ==
Oasis was first teased during a J Balvin interview with Beats 1 radio host Ebro Darden and was first announced during an interview with Complex in September 2018. The album is meant to be deemed as a new and "refreshing" sound. In a press release, Bad Bunny called it "a transcendental and refreshing album; it is a rescue, a relief", while J Balvin said they both "always seem to be on the same wavelength, as he likes what I like."

== Listicles ==
Year-end rankings for Oasis
| Publication | List | Rank |
|---|---|---|
| Billboard | Billboard's 50 Best Albums of 2019 | 10 |
| Rolling Stone | Best Latin Album of 2019 | 2 |

== Track listing ==
Credits adapted from Universal Music Publishing Group's catalog.

Oasis track listing
| No. | Title | Writer(s) | Producer(s) | Length |
|---|---|---|---|---|
| 1. | "Mojaíta" | José Osorio; Benito Martinez; Alejandro Ramírez; Eladio Carrión | Sky | 3:07 |
| 2. | "Yo Le Llego" | Osorio; Martinez; Alberto Melendez; Marco Masís | Albert Hype; Tainy | 4:09 |
| 3. | "Cuidao por Ahí" | Osorio; Martinez; Masís; Jesús Nieves | Tainy | 3:18 |
| 4. | "Qué Pretendes" | Osorio; Martinez; Ramírez; Daniel Taborda | Sky | 3:42 |
| 5. | "La Canción" | Osorio; Martinez; José Arroyo; Gilbert Rodríguez; Ramírez | Nicael Arroyo | 4:02 |
| 6. | "Un Peso" (featuring Marciano Cantero) | Osorio; Martinez; Horacio Cantero; Masís; Ramírez | Tainy | 4:37 |
| 7. | "Odio" | Osorio; Martinez; Ramírez; Luian Malavé; Édgar Semper-Vargas; Xavier Semper-Vargas; Hector Ramos; Nieves | Sky; DJ Luian; Mambo Kingz | 4:30 |
| 8. | "Como un Bebé" (with Mr Eazi) | Osorio; Martinez; Oluwatosin Ajibade; Okiemute Oniko; Uzezi Oniko; Nieves; Masís; Ramírez; Pablo Díaz-Reixa | Legendury Beatz | 3:38 |
| Total length: | | | | 31:03 |

== Charts ==
=== Weekly charts ===
Weekly chart performance for Oasis
| Chart (2019–2025) | Peak position |
|---|---|
| Belgian Albums (Ultratop Flanders) | 129 |
| Belgian Albums (Ultratop Wallonia) | 126 |
| Canadian Albums (Billboard) | 37 |
| Dutch Albums (Album Top 100) | 17 |
| French Albums (SNEP) | 95 |
| Italian Albums (FIMI) | 34 |
| Lithuanian Albums (AGATA) | 45 |
| Norwegian Albums (VG-lista) | 30 |
| Portuguese Albums (AFP) | 82 |
| Spanish Albums (Promusicae) | 45 |
| Swedish Albums (Sverigetopplistan) | 25 |
| Swiss Albums (Schweizer Hitparade) | 22 |
| US Billboard 200 | 9 |
| US Top Latin Albums (Billboard) | 1 |
| US Latin Rhythm Albums (Billboard) | 1 |

=== Year-end charts ===
2019 year-end chart performance for Oasis
| Chart (2019) | Position |
|---|---|
| US Billboard 200 | 195 |
| US Top Latin Albums (Billboard) | 5 |

2020 year-end chart performance for Oasis
| Chart (2020) | Position |
|---|---|
| Spanish Albums (PROMUSICAE) | 69 |
| US Top Latin Albums (Billboard) | 5 |

2021 year-end chart performance for Oasis
| Chart (2021) | Position |
|---|---|
| US Top Latin Albums (Billboard) | 15 |

== Certifications ==
Certifications for Oasis
| Region | Certification | Certified units/sales |
|---|---|---|
| Italy (FIMI) | Gold | 25,000^{‡} |
| Mexico (AMPROFON) | Platinum | 60,000^{‡} |
| Spain (Promusicae) | Gold | 20,000^{‡} |
| United States (RIAA) | 2× Diamond (Latin) | 1,200,000^{‡} |
^{‡} Sales+streaming figures based on certification alone.
