= Qué Pretendes =

2019 single by J Balvin featuring Bad Bunny

Single by J Balvin and Bad Bunny

from the album Oasis
- Language: Spanish
- English title: "Who Do You Think You Are?"
- Released: 28 June 2019
- Genre: Reggaeton
- Length: 3:42
- Label: Universal Music Latino
- Songwriters: José Osorio; Benito Martinez; Alejandro Ramirez; Daniel Esteban Taborda Valencia
- Producer: Sky

J Balvin singles chronology
"Loco Contigo" (2019)	"Qué Pretendes" (2019)	"China" (2019)

Bad Bunny singles chronology
"Estamos Arriba" (2019)	"Qué Pretendes" (2019)	"La Canción" (2019)

Music video
- "Qué Pretendes" on YouTube

"Qué Pretendes" (stylized in uppercase; transl. "Who Do You Think You Are?") is a song by Colombian singer J Balvin and Puerto Rican rapper Bad Bunny. The song was released on 28 June 2019, through Universal Music Latino, as the lead single from their collaborative album Oasis (2019). The song marks the pair's third collaboration on a non-remix single following 2018's "I Like It" with Cardi B.

== Commercial performance ==
Like the rest of the songs of Oasis, "Qué Pretendes" managed to chart on the Billboard Hot Latin Songs chart, peaking at number two. It was the first single to chart on the Billboard Hot 100 from the album, peaking at number 65.

== Lyrics and composition ==
The song's lyrics revolve around being done with an ex who keeps on returning. ¿Qué pretendes is "Who do you think you are?" on Billboard's lyrics translation.

== Music video ==
The video was released together with the song on 28 June through J Balvin's YouTube channel. It surpassed three million views in YouTube in less than 24 hours.

== Live performances ==
"Qué Pretendes" was performed live at the 2019 MTV Video Music Awards on 26 August 2019.

== Charts ==
=== Weekly charts ===
Weekly chart performance for "Qué Pretendes"
Chart (2019–20)	Peak position
Argentina (Argentina Hot 100)	24
Colombia (National-Report)	1
Colombia (Monitor Latino)	1
Dominican Republic Airplay (Monitor Latino)	1
Dominican Republic Streaming (Monitor Latino)	5
Ecuador Airplay (Monitor Latino)	1
Ecuador Streaming (Monitor Latino)	3
El Salvador Airplay (Monitor Latino)	6
Guatemala (Monitor Latino)	9
Honduras (Monitor Latino)	7
Italy (FIMI)	72
Lithuania (AGATA)	52
Netherlands (Single Tip)	4
New Zealand Hot Singles (RMNZ)	35
Panama (Monitor Latino)	12
Peru (Monitor Latino)	1
Portugal (AFP)	45
Puerto Rico (Monitor Latino)	3
Spain (PROMUSICAE)	5
Sweden Heatseeker (Sverigetopplistan)	12
Switzerland (Schweizer Hitparade)	31
US Billboard Hot 100	65
US Hot Latin Songs (Billboard)	2
US Latin Airplay (Billboard)	1
US Latin Rhythm Airplay (Billboard)	1
US Rolling Stone Top 100	31
Venezuela Airplay (Monitor Latino)	10

=== Year-end charts ===
2019 year-end chart performance for "Qué Pretendes"
Chart (2019)	Position
Argentina Airplay (Monitor Latino)	50
Chile Airplay (Monitor Latino)	100
Colombia Airplay (Monitor Latino)	5
Colombia Streaming (Monitor Latino)	7
Costa Rica Airplay (Monitor Latino)	74
Costa Rica Streaming (Monitor Latino)	96
Dominican Republic Airplay (Monitor Latino)	24
Dominican Republic Streaming (Monitor Latino)	16
Ecuador Airplay (Monitor Latino)	18
Ecuador Streaming (Monitor Latino)	25
El Salvador Airplay (Monitor Latino)	76
Guatemala Airplay (Monitor Latino)	66
Guatemala Streaming (Monitor Latino)	75
Honduras Airplay (Monitor Latino)	20
Latin America Airplay (Monitor Latino)	19
Panama Airplay (Monitor Latino)	59
Paraguay Airplay (Monitor Latino)	21
Peru Airplay (Monitor Latino)	45
Peru Streaming (Monitor Latino)	53
Puerto Rica Airplay (Monitor Latino)	18
Puerto Rica Streaming (Monitor Latino)	29
Spain (PROMUSICAE)	49
US Hot Latin Songs (Billboard)	20
US Latin Airplay (Monitor Latino)	53
US Latin Streaming (Monitor Latino)	19
Venezuela Airplay (Monitor Latino)	80

2020 year-end chart performance for "Qué Pretendes"
Chart (2020)	Position
Honduras Airplay (Monitor Latino)	99
Venezuela Airplay (Monitor Latino)	93

== Certifications ==
Certifications and sales for "Qué Pretendes"
Region	Certification	Certified units/sales
Brazil (Pro-Música Brasil)	Platinum	40,000^{‡}
Italy (FIMI)	Gold	50,000^{‡}
Portugal (AFP)	Gold	5,000^{‡}
Spain (Promusicae)	3× Platinum	180,000^{‡}
United States (RIAA)	Platinum (Latin)	60,000^{‡}
^{‡} Sales+streaming figures based on certification alone.

== See also ==
- List of Billboard number-one Latin songs of 2019
