= Con Calma =

2019 song by Daddy Yankee featuring Snow

Single by Daddy Yankee featuring Snow
- Language: Spanish; English
- English title: "Calmly"
- Released: January 24, 2019
- Recorded: Early 2017 – October 2018
- Genre: Reggaeton; dancehall
- Length: 3:12
- Label: El Cartel
- Songwriters: Ramón Ayala; Darrin O'Brien; Michael Grier; Edmond Leary; Shawn Moltke; Terri Moltke
- Producers: Play-N-Skillz; Scott Summers

Daddy Yankee singles chronology
"Adictiva" (2018)	"Con Calma" (2019)	"Baila Baila Baila (Remix)" (2019)

Snow singles chronology
"Shame" (2014)	"Con Calma" (2019)	"Together" (2020)

Music video
- "Con Calma" on YouTube

"Con Calma" (transl. "Calmly") is a song by Puerto Rican rapper Daddy Yankee featuring Canadian rapper Snow. The song was released as a standalone single on January 24, 2019, by El Cartel Records alongside a music video directed by Marlon Peña and filmed in Los Angeles and Toronto, which features a Memoji (Animoji) of Daddy Yankee dancing with a crew. The song is a reimagination of Snow's "Informer". The song was written by Daddy Yankee, Snow, Michael Grier, Edmond Leary, MC Shan, Terri Moltke, and Play-N-Skillz, and was produced by American production duo Play-N-Skillz and co-produced by David "Scott Summers" Macias. A remix version featuring American singer Katy Perry was released on April 19, 2019. The song is also used in the 2019 film Spies in Disguise.

"Con Calma" has been described as an uptempo reggaeton and dancehall song with lyrics about "a woman who works her feminine charms and dances very well". Commercially, the song topped the charts of 20 countries and reached the top 10 of 10 others. In the United States, it has topped the Hot Latin Songs chart for 14 weeks. Across Europe, the single peaked at number one in the Czech Republic, Italy, the Netherlands, Slovenia, and Spain, and reached the top five in Belgium, Poland, and Switzerland. The song also became the longest-reigning number-one on the Argentina Hot 100, with 10 weeks.

== Background ==
"Con Calma" was written by Daddy Yankee, Snow, and Juan "Gaby Music" Rivera, and was produced by American production duo Play-N-Skillz and co-produced by David "Scott Summers" Macias. Previously, Daddy Yankee and Play-N-Skillz worked together on the singles "Not a Crime" (2016) and "Azukita" (2018), while Gaby Music co-wrote Daddy Yankee's Latin Grammy Award-winner song "Dura" (2018) and served as recording engineer on 2017's Latin Grammy Award for Record of the Year "Despacito" by Luis Fonsi featuring Daddy Yankee.

Play-N-Skillz came out with the concept of "Con Calma" during early 2017 and recorded a drum loop, while songwriter Máximo Mundial helped them with the chorus idea. A month later in Los Angeles, the duo showed the project to Daddy Yankee, who was about to record another track but decided to change his plans. The original version of "Con Calma" only featured vocals by Daddy Yankee, who told the producers that the song "needed [a] surprise factor" because they "had to pay tribute to the main author". Play-N-Skillz got in touch with a Miami-based man called Juan Vibras, who was working with independent label Rich Music and connected them with Snow. He recorded a verse, which was sent to Daddy Yankee, who "loved it". Snow and his manager Paul Farberman had been working on devising a comeback since 2017 in order to reintroduce him on music charts through a publishing deal with Warner Chappell Music and a series of "Informer" remixes scheduled to be released by Radikal Records in New Jersey and Roton Music in Romania.

Daddy Yankee told Apple Music that Snow's 1992 single "Informer" was "one of [his] favorite songs growing up, and to do this the right way [he] needed the guy to be on the record." He added that "you got to give honor to a classic in order to make a new version of it", and after showing it to Snow, he replied that he would "100% be on the song". Daddy Yankee described the situation as "a Canadian and a Puerto Rican making Jamaican music, two pioneers, two people pushing the cultures". He wanted to "transmit the best energy and freshness in both dance and music, unifying the music of [his] teen years with today's modern sound."

Daddy Yankee told Billboard that he chose to release "Dura" in 2018 instead of "Con Calma" and added that the former "opened up a new musical horizon and gave [him] the opportunity to stamp [his] signature." "Con Calma" went through several production and arrangement changes until October 2018, when Daddy Yankee called Play-N-Skillz to tell them that the song was going to be released "in the next couple of months".

Snow's "Informer" spent seven consecutive weeks at number one on the Billboard Hot 100 and was the 10th best-performing song of 1993 on that chart. The track was inducted to the 1999 edition of The Guinness Book of Records as "the biggest-selling reggae single in US history". Snow stated that he did not think that "Informer" would be a hit and added that "it is amazing that the song is listened to again after 25 years." He added that "a lot of people made covers before, but Daddy Yankee took it and made something different with his flow." He had a positive reaction to the reworked lyrics, in which there is no mention of themes in "Informer" such as Snow's imprisonment nor his problems with authorities of Toronto, Canada. Daddy Yankee and Snow did not meet for the song's recording nor the filming of the music video.

=== Remix version ===
"Con Calma" (remix)

Single by Daddy Yankee and Katy Perry featuring Snow
- Language: Spanish; English
- Released: April 19, 2019
- Genre: Reggaeton; dancehall
- Length: 3:01
- Label: El Cartel; Capitol
- Songwriters: Ramón Ayala; Katheryn Hudson; Darrin O'Brien; Juan Rivera
- Producers: Play-N-Skillz; Daddy Yankee

Katy Perry singles chronology
"365" (2019)	"Con Calma" (remix) (2019)	"Never Really Over" (2019)

At some point after March 20, 2019, Daddy Yankee was "looking for the surprise factor" but thought that featuring "someone from the urban culture [would have been] predictable". California-based businessman Charles Chavez, American rapper Pitbull's manager from 2007 to 2015, connected Play-N-Skillz with American singer Katy Perry. Less than 24 hours later, the duo flew from Miami to Los Angeles to work on the remix version with Katy Perry, who ended up recording all her vocals in one night.

On April 17, 2019, less than three months after the release of the original version, Daddy Yankee posted an Instagram video of himself listening to Perry's lines and asking his fans when should it be published. The remix version was written by Daddy Yankee, Snow, Juan "Gaby Music" Rivera, and Katy Perry, and was produced by Play-N-Skillz and Daddy Yankee and co-produced by David "Scott Summers" Macias. Edmond Daryll Leary, Michael Grier, Shawn Leigh Moltke, and Terri Moltke received songwriting credits for their work on "Informer".

== Composition ==
"Con Calma" is an uptempo reggaeton and dancehall song with a length of three minutes and twelve seconds. It has been referred to as a remake, reimagination or cover version of Snow's 1992 reggae single "Informer". Madeleine Marr of Miami Herald's Miami.com described the lyrics as about "a woman who works her feminine charms," while Camile Roldán Soto of El Nuevo Día stated that the track is about "a girl who dances very well." Jessica Roiz of Billboard described the song as Daddy Yankee and Snow "praising a girl's dance moves". Celia Fernandez of O, The Oprah Magazine wrote that the single is about "a guy calmly watching a girl dance the night away at the club." The chorus was described by Fernandez as Daddy Yankee "liking how [a girl] moves and looks when she is on the dance floor."

== Release and reception ==
"Con Calma" was made available for digital download and online streaming on January 24, 2019, by Daddy Yankee's record label El Cartel Records under exclusive license to Universal Music Latin. Daddy Yankee encouraged people on social media to take part of the Con Calma Challenge, which consists of uploading a video dancing to the song, in order to promote the single. Shortly after the song's release, Paul Farberman reported that "there's talk of Snow going on tour with Daddy Yankee later this year."

Suzy Exposito of Rolling Stone described the track as a "brilliant and maximalist pop song" and referred to Snow's verse as a "delightful nostalgia bomb". Jon Caramanica of The New York Times wrote that the single is a "gratuitously catchy Spanish-language update of a gratuitously catchy song." Raisa Bruner of Time stated that "Daddy Yankee proves he's still very much on top of the game" despite having competition with "plenty of rising stars in Latin music". Bruner also wrote that "even if you don't speak Spanish, [the chorus] is easy enough to pick up — and will inevitably get stuck in your head, not to mention get people onto a dance floor".

The remix version with Katy Perry was released to digital retailers and streaming platforms on April 19, 2019, by El Cartel Records and Capitol Records. It was released to contemporary hit radio in the United States on April 23, 2019.

Forbes contributor Jeff Benjamin criticized the remix version by stating that Katy Perry's Spanish-language lines are "quite simple sentences". He also opined that her new lyrics "teeter into some tired Hollywood stereotypes about Latin culture," such as the word "spicy" being used for "fetishizing Latinx women or playing off an idea that Latinx people have quick tempers." Benjamin also criticized the song's opening by writing that "[Katy Perry] purring "Ay, Daddy!" feels more eye roll-worthy than sexy." He compared the track's treatment to 2017's "Despacito" by Luis Fonsi and Daddy Yankee when a remix featuring Canadian singer Justin Bieber "took [the song] to the next level." He concluded the review by saying that "these few missteps with the lyrics and a lack of Perry interacting deeper with the Latin hit could stall this remix from gaining the true crossover success it clearly aims to capture."

Suzy Exposito of Rolling Stone wrote that "[Katy Perry] makes a charming throwback to her Teenage Dream days [...] and purrs a little bit of Spanish for good measure, but moans of 'Ay Daddy... ¿Cómo te llamas, baby?/A little mezcal got me feelin’ spicy' leave an awkward impression on both Yankee and Perry fans alike." She referred to the remix version as "weird" and stated that "Perry may be a pop chameleon, but her verses make for a cultural mismatch [...] and evoke the age-old Carmen Miranda tropicalism we should have left in the fifties." Jon Caramanica of The New York Times stated that the involvement of Katy Perry in the remix version was the "biggest surprise" of an eventual English-language version of the song "in the contemporary pop climate." Caramanica expressed that he was not surprised by her opening verse being a "cross-cultural flirtation" and described Perry's version of the chorus as "awkward."

Frida Garza of Jezebel website gave a negative review of the song, stating that "whoever approved this Katy Perry remix [...] might actually be trying to sabotage her career" and wondering if an AI wrote the first three lines of her opening verse. Garza concluded by saying that "[Perry] hoped to insert herself into something that has proven to be popular with the least amount of effort possible, really to the detriment of both herself and this perfectly good Yankee song." On the other hand, Liz Calvario of Entertainment Tonight wrote that "['Con Calma'] just got better" with the remix version, which was described as "catchy". Marco Salazar of E! Online referred to the collaboration as "epic" and asked for the release of a music video.

=== Accolades ===
The remix version of "Con Calma" was nominated for a Teen Choice Award for Choice Latin Song at the 21st Teen Choice Awards. The original version has received a Mexico Kids' Choice Award for Favorite Hit at the 11th Mexico Kids' Choice Awards and has a pending nomination for an MTV Video Music Award for Best Latin Song at the 36th MTV Video Music Awards.

Ceremony	Date	Category	Version	Result
Latin Grammy Awards	November 14, 2019	Best Urban Fusion/Performance	Original	Nominated

== Commercial performance ==
In the United States, "Con Calma" debuted at number six on the US Hot Latin Songs chart, becoming Daddy Yankee's 26th top 10 on the list and his highest debut since "Despacito" on February 4, 2017. It also became his third number-one on the US Latin Digital Songs chart after selling 10,000 downloads on its first full tracking week. "Con Calma" peaked at number one on Hot Latin Songs on May 4, 2019, becoming Daddy Yankee's sixth number-one on the list, and remained there for 14 consecutive weeks until August 3, 2019. On the issue dated June 29, 2019, at the ninth week at number one of "Con Calma" on Hot Latin Songs, Daddy Yankee became the second artist to top the chart for 100 weeks. (Note: Daddy Yankee's number-one singles on the US Billboard Hot Latin Songs add up a total of 100 weeks at the top position. "Despacito" spent 56 weeks, "Rompe" and "Limbo" both spent 15 weeks, "Con Calma" spent nine weeks, "Shaky Shaky" spent four weeks, and "Lovumba" spent one week.) It has also topped the US Latin Digital Songs and Latin Streaming Songs charts for 14 weeks each and Latin Airplay for eight weeks.

On the US Billboard Hot 100, the song debuted at number 90 on the week ending February 9, 2019, becoming Daddy Yankee's 11th chart entry and Snow's first since 1993 and his third overall. The original version peaked at number 48 on March 30, 2019. After the release of the remix version with Katy Perry, the song peaked at number 22 on June 8, 2019, becoming his third highest-ranking title on the chart—behind "Despacito" and "Oye Mi Canto"—as well as Perry's 21st top 30. "Con Calma" was removed from the Hot 100 on the issue dated August 10, 2019, after a chart run of 25 weeks due to a Billboard recurrent rule that removes titles that rank below position 50 after 20 weeks. It has also peaked at number 11 on Digital Songs after selling 13,000 downloads on the week ending May 4, 2019, at number 19 on Radio Songs, and at number 23 on Streaming Songs.

"Con Calma" was the best-selling and fourth most-streamed Spanish-language song of the first half of 2019 in the United States, with 120,000 downloads sold and 216,217,000 video and audio streams.

In the United States, the single sold 120,000 downloads as of June 20, 2019, and received a Latin 11× platinum certification by the Recording Industry Association of America (RIAA) on July 9, 2019, for units of over 660,000 sales plus track-equivalent streams.

Internationally, the original version topped the charts of Argentina, Bolivia, Chile, Colombia, Costa Rica, Czech Republic, Ecuador, Guatemala, Honduras, Italy, the Netherlands, Nicaragua, Panama, Paraguay, Peru, Puerto Rico, Slovenia, Spain, Uruguay, and Venezuela, and reached the top 10 in Austria, Belgium, Dominican Republic, El Salvador, France, Germany, Portugal, Romania, and Switzerland. It has also reached the top 50 in Denmark, Hungary, Ireland, Poland, Slovakia, and Sweden. In Snow's native Canada, the song has reached number six on the Canadian Hot 100, becoming his first entry on the chart since its inception in 2007. "Con Calma" was certified triple platinum by the Spanish Music Producers (PROMUSICAE), double platinum by the Federazione Industria Musicale Italiana (FIMI), and diamond by the Syndicat National de l'Édition Phonographique (SNEP) and Music Canada.

The song topped the Argentina Hot 100 for 10 consecutive weeks, becoming the chart's longest-running number-one since its inception on October 13, 2018.

== Music video ==
The music video for "Con Calma" was directed by Dominican filmmaker and director Marlon Peña, who had previously worked with Daddy Yankee on clips including "Mayor Que Yo" (2005), "Shaky Shaky" (2016), and "Hielo" (2018), among others. Filming took place in Los Angeles and Toronto. The official music video on YouTube was released on Daddy Yankee's channel on January 24, 2019. It features an Animoji version of a younger Daddy Yankee named Sikiri. The character dances alongside a dancing crew from Chapkis Dance Family wearing sweatshirts and long pants throughout the entire music video, while Daddy Yankee and Snow have brief appearances during their respective verses. The dancers were choreographed by Greg Chapkis and Dylan Michael.

In May, 2025 the clip surpassed 3 billion views, making it the most-viewed video released in 2019. The choreography has received a Premio Juventud for Sick Dance Routine at the 16th Premios Juventud.

== Live performances ==
Daddy Yankee performed "Con Calma" live for the first time at the 31st Lo Nuestro Awards on February 21, 2019, in Miami. He became the first Hispanic act to perform on American late-night talk show The Late Late Show with James Corden on March 20, 2019, where he sang the track. The following day, Daddy Yankee performed it at the 1st Tu Música Urbana Awards at the José Miguel Agrelot Coliseum in San Juan, Puerto Rico. He also performed it on YouTube's digital newfront event Brandcast at the Radio City Music Hall in New York City on May 2, 2019. Daddy Yankee and Katy Perry performed the remix version at the finale of the 17th season of reality competition American Idol on May 19, 2019. He also performed the original version on Spanish talk show El Hormiguero on May 30, 2019, and as a guest artist on Nickelodeon's sketch comedy series All That on June 22, 2019.

A European concert tour named after the single launched on May 31, 2019, and will include 16 concerts across eight countries. Daddy Yankee announced on June 22, 2019, that the tour will be expanded to the Americas, starting on July 19, 2019, and concluding on March 21, 2020, including eight concerts across six nations.

== Credits and personnel ==
Credits adapted from Tidal.

- Play-N-Skillz – producers
- Juan Rivera "Gaby Music" – songwriting
- Snow – songwriting, vocals
- David Macias "Scott Summers" – co-producer
- Daddy Yankee – songwriting, vocals

== Charts ==
=== Weekly charts ===
Weekly chart performance
Chart (2019–2020) (Note: Chart peaks in Argentina, Canada, Croatia, the United Kingdom, and the United States measure combined data between the original and the remix version.)	Peak position
Argentina (Argentina Hot 100)	1
Austria (Ö3 Austria Top 40)	7
Belgium (Ultratop 50 Flanders)	6
Belgium (Ultratop 50 Wallonia)	2
Bolivia Airplay (Monitor Latino)	1
Brazil Pop International Airplay (Crowley)	8
Canada Hot 100 (Billboard)	6
Canada AC (Billboard)	28
Canada CHR/Top 40 (Billboard)	14
Canada Hot AC (Billboard)	35
Chile Airplay (Monitor Latino)	1
China Foreign Songs (Billboard)	14
Colombia Airplay (National-Report)	1
Costa Rica Airplay (Monitor Latino)	1
Croatia International Airplay (Top lista)	13
Czech Republic Airplay (ČNS IFPI)	1
Czech Republic Singles Digital (ČNS IFPI)	17
Denmark (Tracklisten)	37
Dominican Republic Airplay (Monitor Latino)	4
Ecuador Airplay (Monitor Latino)	1
El Salvador Airplay (Monitor Latino)	2
Finland (Suomen virallinen lista)	13
France (SNEP)	7
Germany (GfK)	6
Greece International Streaming (IFPI)	10
Guatemala Airplay (Monitor Latino)	1
Honduras Airplay (Monitor Latino)	1
Hungary (Dance Top 40)	1
Hungary (Rádiós Top 40)	2
Hungary (Single Top 40)	5
Hungary (Stream Top 40)	6
Ireland (IRMA)	43
Italy (FIMI)	1
Lithuania (AGATA)	18
Mexico (Billboard Mexican Airplay)	1
Mexico Streaming (AMPROFON)	1
Netherlands (Dutch Top 40)	1
Netherlands (Single Top 100)	4
New Zealand Hot Singles (RMNZ)	33
Nicaragua Airplay (Monitor Latino)	1
Panama Airplay (Monitor Latino)	1
Paraguay Airplay (Monitor Latino)	1
Peru Airplay (Monitor Latino)	1
Poland Airplay (ZPAV)	2
Portugal (AFP)	6
Puerto Rico Airplay (Monitor Latino)	1
Romania (Airplay 100)	2
Slovakia Airplay (ČNS IFPI)	8
Slovakia Singles Digital (ČNS IFPI)	11
Slovenia (SloTop50)	1
Spain (PROMUSICAE)	1
Sweden (Sverigetopplistan)	21
Switzerland (Schweizer Hitparade)	2
UK Singles (Official Charts)	66
Uruguay Airplay (Monitor Latino)	1
US Billboard Hot 100	22
US Hot Latin Songs (Billboard)	1
US Latin Airplay (Billboard)	1
US Hot Rap Songs (Billboard)	19
US Rolling Stone Top 100	84
Venezuela Airplay (Monitor Latino)	1

2024 weekly chart performance
Chart (2024)	Peak position
Romania Airplay (TopHit)	84

2025 weekly chart performance
Chart (2025)	Peak position
Romania Airplay (TopHit)	78

2019–2020 weekly chart performance for the remix
Chart (2019–2020)	Peak position
Argentina Hot 100 (Billboard)	1
Canada Hot 100 (Billboard)	6
CIS Airplay (TopHit)	1
Croatia International Airplay (Top lista)	13
Greece Digital (Billboard)	6
New Zealand Hot Singles (RMNZ)	40
Russia Airplay (TopHit)	1
UK Singles (Official Charts)	66
Ukraine Airplay (TopHit)	11
US Billboard Hot 100	22
US Dance Airplay (Billboard)	36
US Dance Club Songs (Billboard)	43
US Pop Airplay (Billboard)	19
US Rhythmic Airplay (Billboard)	17

2026 weekly chart performance for the remix
Chart (2026)	Peak position
Moldova Airplay (TopHit)	90

=== Monthly charts ===
2019 monthly chart performance
Chart (2019)	Peak position
Argentina Streaming (CAPIF)	1
Paraguay Airplay (SGP)	56
Slovenia Airplay (SloTop50)	1

2025 monthly chart performance
Chart (2025)	Peak position
Romania Airplay (TopHit)	81

Monthly chart performance for the remix
Chart (2019)	Peak position
Russia Airplay (TopHit)	3
Ukraine Airplay (TopHit)	21

=== Year-end charts ===
2019 year-end chart performance
Chart (2019)	Position
Argentina Airplay (Monitor Latino)	2
Austria (Ö3 Austria Top 40)	18
Belgium (Ultratop Flanders)	13
Belgium (Ultratop Wallonia)	12
Bolivia Airplay (Monitor Latino)	1
Canada (Canadian Hot 100)	27
CIS Airplay (TopHit)	15
Chile Airplay (Monitor Latino)	2
Colombia Airplay (Monitor Latino)	2
Costa Rica Airplay (Monitor Latino)	2
Dominican Republic Airplay (Monitor Latino)	6
Ecuador Airplay (Monitor Latino)	1
El Salvador Airplay (Monitor Latino)	2
France (SNEP)	17
Germany (Official German Charts)	11
Guatemala Airplay (Monitor Latino)	1
Honduras Airplay (Monitor Latino)	1
Hungary (Dance Top 40)	10
Hungary (Rádiós Top 40)	10
Hungary (Single Top 40)	19
Iceland (Tónlistinn)	60
Italy (FIMI)	7
Mexico Airplay (Monitor Latino)	1
Netherlands (Dutch Top 40)	7
Netherlands (Single Top 100)	14
Nicaragua Airplay (Monitor Latino)	1
Panama Airplay (Monitor Latino)	1
Paraguay Airplay (Monitor Latino)	1
Peru Airplay (Monitor Latino)	1
Poland (ZPAV)	9
Portugal (AFP)	11
Puerto Rico Airplay (Monitor Latino)	1
Romania (Airplay 100)	10
Russia (TopHit)	16
Slovenia Airplay (SloTop50)	4
Spain (PROMUSICAE)	2
Sweden (Sverigetopplistan)	65
Switzerland (Schweizer Hitparade)	9
Ukraine Airplay (TopHit)	82
Uruguay Airplay (Monitor Latino)	3
US Billboard Hot 100	65
US Hot Latin Songs (Billboard)	3
US Latin Airplay (Billboard)	1
Venezuela Airplay (Monitor Latino)	2

2020 year-end chart performance
Chart (2020)	Position
Argentina Airplay (Monitor Latino)	38
Hungary (Dance Top 40)	5
Hungary (Rádiós Top 40)	28

2021 year-end chart performance
Chart (2021)	Position
Hungary (Dance Top 40)	40

2022 year-end chart performance
Chart (2022)	Position
Hungary (Dance Top 40)	97
Hungary (Rádiós Top 40)	61

2023 year-end chart performance
Chart (2023)	Position
Hungary (Rádiós Top 40)	84

Year-end chart performance
Chart (2025)	Position
Romania Airplay (TopHit)	130

=== Decade-end charts ===
Decade-end chart performance
Chart (2010–2019)	Position
US Hot Latin Songs (Billboard)	21

=== All-time charts ===
All-time chart performance
Chart (2021)	Position
US Hot Latin Songs (Billboard)	44

== Certifications ==
Certifications and sales
Region	Certification	Certified units/sales
Belgium (BRMA)	Platinum	40,000^{‡}
Brazil (Pro-Música Brasil)	Diamond	160,000^{‡}
Canada (Music Canada)	4× Platinum	320,000^{‡}
Denmark (IFPI Danmark)	Platinum	90,000^{‡}
France (SNEP)	Diamond	333,333^{‡}
Germany (BVMI)	Platinum	400,000^{‡}
Italy (FIMI)	4× Platinum	200,000^{‡}
Mexico (AMPROFON)	11× Diamond+Platinum	3,360,000^{‡}
Poland (ZPAV)	2× Platinum	40,000^{‡}
Portugal (AFP)	3× Platinum	30,000^{‡}
Spain (Promusicae)	6× Platinum	240,000^{‡}
United Kingdom (BPI) Remix version	Gold	400,000^{‡}
United States (RIAA)	41× Platinum (Latin)	2,460,000^{‡}
Streaming
Sweden (GLF)	Platinum	8,000,000^{†}
^{‡} Sales+streaming figures based on certification alone.^{†} Streaming-only figures based on certification alone.

== Release history ==
Release dates and formats
Region	Date	Format(s)	Version	Label(s)	Ref.
United States	January 24, 2019	Digital download; streaming	Original	El Cartel	
Italy	February 1, 2019	Radio airplay	Original	Universal	
United States	April 19, 2019	Digital download; streaming	Remix	El Cartel; Capitol	
Italy	April 19, 2019	Radio airplay	Remix	Universal	
United States	April 23, 2019	Contemporary hit radio	Remix	El Cartel; Capitol	

== See also ==
- List of Billboard Hot Latin Songs and Latin Airplay number ones of 2019
