= Nibiru (album) =

Studio album by Ozuna
- Released: November 29, 2019
- Length: 59:03
- Languages: Spanish; English
- Labels: Aura Music; Sony Latin

Ozuna chronology
Aura (2018)	Nibiru (2019)	ENOC (2020)

Singles from Nibiru
- 1. "Baila Baila Baila" Released: January 5, 2019; 2. "Amor Genuino" Released: June 4, 2019; 3. "Te Soñé de Nuevo" Released: June 6, 2019; 4. "Hasta Que Salga el Sol" Released: November 7, 2019; 5. "Fantasía" Released: November 28, 2019

Nibiru is the third studio album by Puerto Rican reggaeton singer Ozuna. It was released through Aura Music and Sony Music Latin on November 29, 2019. It was preceded by the release of five singles: "Baila Baila Baila", "Amor Genuino", "Te Soñé de Nuevo", "Hasta Que Salga el Sol" and "Fantasía".

== Background ==
Ozuna first announced the record in November 2018, three months after the release of his second album Aura. While he referenced it in a verse of his single "Luz Apaga", the song was not included on the album. A year on, Ozuna made the album available to pre-save and posted the album cover on Instagram. Ozuna's tracks "Cambio" and "Muito Calor", the former a collaboration with fellow Puerto Rican artist Anuel AA and the latter a collaboration with Brazilian singer Anitta, were also expected to be on the album, but did not make the track listing.

== Commercial performance ==
In the United States, Nibiru debuted at number 41 on the US Billboard 200 and at number one on the Billboard Top Latin Albums chart, with 17,000 album-equivalent units. The overall unit sum marks the fifth-largest debut for a Latin album released in 2019.

In Mexico, the album was certified Gold within just one day of being released.

== Critical reception ==
Professional ratings
Review scores
Source	Rating
Allmusic	4/5 stars
Rolling Stone	3/5 stars

Gary Suarez of Rolling Stone wrote that "after the project's initial announcement and subsequent months of release date silence, the phrase "Nibiru: Coming Soon" began to take on meme-like properties. More importantly, it created grand, perhaps unreasonable expectations that the Latin superstar regrettably hasn't entirely lived up to." He continued, "Those hoping for alien perreo hybrids assuredly won't find them on Nibiru, and admittedly such reggaeton futurism is better suited to the likes of Tomasa Del Real and her underground ilk. But while the album doesn't quite reach moonwalk status, Ozuna's progressive steps demonstrated here towards perfecting his popwise craft warrant further analysis and repeat listening right here on Earth."

== Track listing ==
No.	Title	Length
1.	"Nibiru"	02:40
2.	"Hasta Que Salga El Sol"	03:10
3.	"Temporal" (Featuring Willy)	04:00
4.	"Fantasía"	02:57
5.	"Yo Tengo Una Gata" (With Sech)	03:06
6.	"Fuego"	03:31
7.	"Eres Top" (With Diddy and DJ Snake)	03:26
8.	"Pégate"	03:20
9.	"Patek" (With Anuel AA And Snoop Dogg)	04:11
10.	"Difícil Olvidar"	03:33
11.	"Sin Pensar" (Featuring Swae Lee)	04:11
12.	"Independiente"	03:14
13.	"Reggaeton En Paris" (With Dalex And Nicky Jam)	04:03
14.	"Te Soñé De Nuevo"	03:20
15.	"Danzau"	02:43
16.	"Amor Genuino"	03:00
17.	"Baila Baila Baila"	02:40
18.	"Qué Pena"	02:34
Total length:		59:04

== Charts ==
=== Weekly charts ===
Weekly chart performance for Nibiru
Chart (2019)	Peak position
Italian Albums (FIMI)	60
Spanish Albums (Promusicae)	55
Swiss Albums (Schweizer Hitparade)	50
US Billboard 200	41
US Top Latin Albums (Billboard)	1
US Latin Rhythm Albums (Billboard)	1

=== Year-end charts ===
Year-end chart performance for Nibiru
Chart (2020)	Position
Spanish Albums (PROMUSICAE)	57
US Top Latin Albums (Billboard)	12

== Certifications ==
Region	Certification	Certified units/sales
Mexico (AMPROFON)	Gold	30,000^{‡}
United States (RIAA)	5× Platinum (Latin)	300,000^{‡}
^{‡} Sales+streaming figures based on certification alone.
