= List of awards and nominations received by Ozuna =

Ozuna awards and nominations
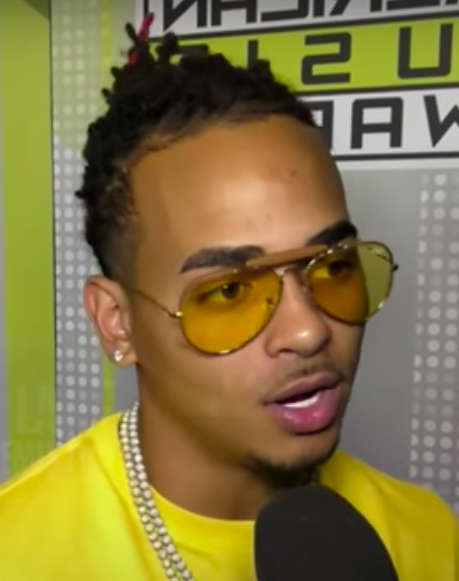
- Ozuna in 2017
Awards and nominations
Award	Wins	Nominations
American Music Awards	0	4
Billboard Music Awards	5	16
Billboard Latin Music Awards	12	53
BMI Latin Awards	28	28
Guinness World Records	4	4
iHeartRadio Music Awards	1	6
Latin American Music Awards	8	30
Latin Grammy Awards	2	14
LOS40 Music Awards	1	5
MTV Europe Music Awards	0	3
MTV Video Music Awards	0	3
Premios Juventud	4	15
Premios Lo Nuestro	8	18
Teen Choice Awards	0	2

Totals (Note: Certain award groups do not simply award one winner. They acknowledge several different recipients, have runners-up, and have third place. Since this is a specific recognition and is different from losing an award, runner-up mentions are considered wins in this award tally. For simplification and to avoid errors, each award in this list has been presumed to have had a prior nomination.)
- Wins: 82
- Nominations: 238

The following is a comprehensive list of awards and nominations received by Ozuna, a Puerto Rican Latin trap and reggaeton singer who is regarded as the "New King of Reggaeton". Ozuna has won two Latin Grammy Awards—both for "Yo x Ti, Tu x Mi"—from ten nominations, as well as five Billboard Music Awards, twelve Billboard Latin Music Awards, six Latin American Music Awards, eìght Lo Nuestro Awards, and four Guinness World Records.

== Awards and nominations ==
Name of the award ceremony, year presented, recipient of the award, category and result
Award	Year	Recipient(s) and nominee(s)	Category	Result	Ref.
American Music Awards	2018	Himself	Favorite Latin Artist	Nominated	
American Music Awards	2019	Himself	Favorite Latin Artist	Nominated	
American Music Awards	2020	Himself	Favorite Latin Artist	Nominated	
American Music Awards	2021	Himself	Favorite Latin Artist	Nominated	
Billboard Music Awards	2018	Himself	Top Latin Artist	Won	
Billboard Music Awards	2018	Odisea	Top Latin Album	Won	
Billboard Music Awards	2018	"Escapate Conmigo" (with Wisin)	Top Latin Song	Nominated	
Billboard Music Awards	2019	Himself	Top Latin Artist	Won	
Billboard Music Awards	2019	Aura	Top Latin Album	Won	
Billboard Music Awards	2019	"Te Boté" (with Casper Magico, Nio Garcia, Darell, Nicky Jam & Bad Bunny)	Top Latin Song	Won	
Billboard Music Awards	2019	"Taki Taki" (with DJ Snake, Selena Gomez & Cardi B)	Top Latin Song	Nominated	
Billboard Music Awards	2019	"Taki Taki" (with DJ Snake, Selena Gomez & Cardi B)	Top Dance/Electronic Song	Nominated	
Billboard Music Awards	2020	Himself	Top Latin Artist	Nominated	
Billboard Music Awards	2020	"China" (with Anuel AA, Daddy Yankee, Karol G & J Balvin)	Top Latin Song	Nominated	
Billboard Music Awards	2020	"Otro Trago" (with Sech, Darell, Nicky Jam & Anuel AA)	Top Latin Song	Nominated	
Billboard Music Awards	2021	Himself	Top Latin Artist	Nominated	
Billboard Music Awards	2021	Himself	Top Latin Male Artist	Nominated	
Billboard Music Awards	2021	"Caramelo" (with Karol G & Myke Towers)	Top Latin Song	Nominated	
Billboard Latin Music Awards	2017	Himself	New Artist of the Year	Nominated`	
Billboard Latin Music Awards	2018	Himself	Artist of the Year	Won`	
Billboard Latin Music Awards	2018	Himself	Male Hot Latin Songs Artist of the Year	Nominated	
Billboard Latin Music Awards	2018	Himself	Male Top Latin Albums Artist of the Year	Nominated	
Billboard Latin Music Awards	2018	Himself	Solo Latin Rhythm Artist of the Year	Nominated	
Billboard Latin Music Awards	2018	"Escápate Conmigo"	Hot Latin Song of the Year	Nominated	
Billboard Latin Music Awards	2018	"Escápate Conmigo"	Airplay Song of the Year	Nominated	
Billboard Latin Music Awards	2018	"Escápate Conmigo"	Latin Rhythm Song of the Year	Nominated	
Billboard Latin Music Awards	2018	Odisea	Top Latin Album of the Year	Nominated	
Billboard Latin Music Awards	2018	Odisea	Latin Rhythm Album of the Year	Nominated	
Billboard Latin Music Awards	2019	Himself	Artist of the Year	Won	
Billboard Latin Music Awards	2019	Himself	Male Hot Latin Songs Artist of the Year	Won	
Billboard Latin Music Awards	2019	Himself	Male Top Latin Albums Artist of the Year	Won	
Billboard Latin Music Awards	2019	Himself	Solo Latin Rhythm Artist of the Year	Won	
Billboard Latin Music Awards	2019	Himself	Songwriter of the Year	Nominated	
Billboard Latin Music Awards	2019	"Te Boté"	Hot Latin Song of the Year	Won	
Billboard Latin Music Awards	2019	"Taki Taki"	Hot Latin Song of the Year	Nominated	
Billboard Latin Music Awards	2019	"Taki Taki"	Hot Latin Song of the Year, Vocal Event	Nominated	
Billboard Latin Music Awards	2019	"Te Boté"	Hot Latin Song of the Year, Vocal Event	Won	
Billboard Latin Music Awards	2019	"Te Boté"	Airplay Song of the Year	Nominated	
Billboard Latin Music Awards	2019	"Me Niego"	Airplay Song of the Year	Nominated	
Billboard Latin Music Awards	2019	"Me Niego"	Latin Pop Song of the Year	Won	
Billboard Latin Music Awards	2019	"Me Niego"	Latin Rhythm Song of the Year	Nominated	
Billboard Latin Music Awards	2019	"Te Boté"	Latin Rhythm Song of the Year	Nominated	
Billboard Latin Music Awards	2019	"Taki Taki"	Digital Song of the Year	Nominated	
Billboard Latin Music Awards	2019	"Te Boté"	Digital Song of the Year	Nominated	
Billboard Latin Music Awards	2019	"Te Boté"	Streaming Song of the Year	Won	
Billboard Latin Music Awards	2019	"El Farsante"	Streaming Song of the Year	Nominated	
Billboard Latin Music Awards	2019	Odisea	Top Latin Album of the Year	Won	
Billboard Latin Music Awards	2019	Aura	Top Latin Album of the Year	Nominated	
Billboard Latin Music Awards	2019	Aura	Latin Rhythm Album of the Year	Nominated	
Billboard Latin Music Awards	2019	Odisea	Latin Rhythm Album of the Year	Won	
Billboard Latin Music Awards	2019	"Sobredosis"	Tropical Song of the Year	Won	
Billboard Latin Music Awards	2020	Himself	Artist of the Year	Nominated	
Billboard Latin Music Awards	2020	Himself	Male Hot Latin Songs Artist of the Year	Nominated	
Billboard Latin Music Awards	2020	Himself	Male Top Latin Albums Artist of the Year	Nominated	
Billboard Latin Music Awards	2020	Himself	Solo Latin Rhythm Artist of the Year	Nominated	
Billboard Latin Music Awards	2020	Himself	Songwriter of the Year	Nominated	
Billboard Latin Music Awards	2020	"Otro Trago"	Hot Latin Song of the Year	Nominated	
Billboard Latin Music Awards	2020	"Otro Trago"	Vocal Event Hot Latin Song of the Year	Nominated	
Billboard Latin Music Awards	2020	"Otro Trago"	Streaming Song of the Year	Nominated	
Billboard Latin Music Awards	2020	"Otro Trago"	Latin Rhythm Song of the Year	Nominated	
Billboard Latin Music Awards	2020	"Baila Baila Baila"	Latin Rhythm Song of the Year	Nominated	
Billboard Latin Music Awards	2020	"Baila Baila Baila"	Digital Song of the Year	Nominated	
Billboard Latin Music Awards	2020	"Baila Baila Baila"	Airplay Song of the Year	Nominated	
Billboard Latin Music Awards	2020	"China"	Airplay Song of the Year	Nominated	
Billboard Latin Music Awards	2020	"Yo x Ti, Tu x Mi"	Latin Pop Song of the Year	Nominated	
Billboard Latin Music Awards	2021	"Mamacita"	Latin Pop Song of the Year	Won	
Billboard Latin Music Awards	2021	"Travesuras"	Tropical Song of the Year	Nominated	
Billboard Latin Music Awards	2021	Himself	Male Top Latin Albums Artist of the Year	Nominated`	
Billboard Latin Music Awards	2021	Himself	Artist of the Year	Nominated`	
Billboard Latin Music Awards	2021	"Caramelo"	Airplay Song of the Year	Nominated`	
Billboard Latin Music Awards	2022	Himself	Top Latin Albums Artist of the Year, Male	Nominated	
Billboard Latin Music Awards	2023	Himself	Top Latin Albums Artist of the Year, Male	Nominated	
Billboard Latin Music Awards	2023	"Monotonía"	Airplay Song of the Year	Nominated	
Billboard Latin Music Awards	2023	"Monotonía"	Tropical Song of the Year	Nominated	
BMI Latin Awards	2018	"Dile Que Tú Me Quieres"	Winning Songs	Won	
BMI Latin Awards	2019	Himself	Contemporary Latin Songwriter of the Year	Won	
BMI Latin Awards	2019	"Ahora Dice"	Winning Songs	Won	
BMI Latin Awards	2019	"Criminal"	Winning Songs	Won	
BMI Latin Awards	2019	"El Farsante"	Winning Songs	Won	
BMI Latin Awards	2019	"Escápate Conmigo"	Winning Songs	Won	
BMI Latin Awards	2019	"La Modelo"	Winning Songs	Won	
BMI Latin Awards	2019	"La Rompe Corazones"	Winning Songs	Won	
BMI Latin Awards	2019	"Se Preparó"	Winning Songs	Won	
BMI Latin Awards	2019	"Te Boté" (Remix)	Winning Songs	Won	
BMI Latin Awards	2019	"Tu Foto"	Winning Songs	Won	
BMI Latin Awards	2020	"Taki Taki"	Contemporary Latin Song of the Year	Won	
BMI Latin Awards	2020	"Me Niego"	Winning Songs	Won	
BMI Latin Awards	2020	"Solita"	Winning Songs	Won	
BMI Latin Awards	2020	"Taki Taki"	Winning Songs	Won	
BMI Latin Awards	2020	"Vaina Loca"	Winning Songs	Won	
BMI Latin Awards	2020	"Única"	Winning Songs	Won	
BMI Latin Awards	2021	Himself	Contemporary Latin Songwriter of the Year	Won	
BMI Latin Awards	2021	"Adicto"	Winning Songs	Won	
BMI Latin Awards	2021	"Baila Baila Baila"	Winning Songs	Won	
BMI Latin Awards	2021	"Baila Baila Baila (Remix)"	Winning Songs	Won	
BMI Latin Awards	2021	"China"	Winning Songs	Won	
BMI Latin Awards	2021	"Otro Trago (Remix)"	Winning Songs	Won	
BMI Latin Awards	2021	"Te Robaré"	Winning Songs	Won	
BMI Latin Awards	2021	"Te Soñé de Nuevo"	Winning Songs	Won	
BMI Latin Awards	2021	"Yo x Ti, Tu x Mi"	Winning Songs	Won	
BMI Latin Awards	2022	"Caramelo"	Winning Songs	Won	
BMI Latin Awards	2022	"El Muchacho Alegre"	Winning Songs	Won	
BMI Latin Awards	2022	"Mamacita"	Winning Songs	Won	
BMI Latin Awards	2023	"Caramelo (Remix)"	Winning Songs	Won	
BMI Latin Awards	2023	"Despeinada"	Winning Songs	Won	
Guinness World Records	2020	Himself	Artist with The Most Videos to Reach One Billion Views on YouTube	Won	
Guinness World Records	2020	Himself	Most Billboard Latin Music Award Nominations For a Single Artist In a Single Year	Won	
Guinness World Records	2020	Himself	Most Billboard Latin Music Award Wins for a Single Artist In a Single Year	Won	
Guinness World Records	2020	Odisea	Most Weeks at No. 1 on Billboard's Top Latin Albums Chart (Male)	Won	
Heat Latin Music Awards	2017	Himself	Best New Artist	Nominated	
Heat Latin Music Awards	2019	Himself	Best Male Artist	Nominated	
Heat Latin Music Awards	2019	Himself	Best Urban Artist	Nominated	
Heat Latin Music Awards	2019	"Me Niego"	Best Collaboration	Nominated	
Heat Latin Music Awards	2019	"Criminal"	Best Collaboration	Nominated	
Heat Latin Music Awards	2020	Himself	Best Male Artist	Nominated	
Heat Latin Music Awards	2020	Himself	Best Urban Artist	Nominated	
Heat Latin Music Awards	2020	"China"	Best Collaboration	Nominated	
Heat Latin Music Awards	2021	Himself	Best Male Artist	Nominated	
Heat Latin Music Awards	2021	Himself	Best Urban Artist	Nominated	
Heat Latin Music Awards	2021	"Los Dioses"	Video of the Year	Nominated	
Heat Latin Music Awards	2022	Himself	Best Urban Artist	Nominated	
Heat Latin Music Awards	2023	Himself	Best Male Artist	Nominated	
Heat Latin Music Awards	2023	"Hey Mor"	Best Collaboration	Nominated	
iHeartRadio Music Awards	2018	Himself	Best New Latin Artist	Won	
iHeartRadio Music Awards	2019	Himself	Latin Artist of the Year	Nominated	
iHeartRadio Music Awards	2019	"Me Niego"	Latin Song of the Year	Nominated	
iHeartRadio Music Awards	2019	"Taki Taki"	Best Music Video	Nominated	
iHeartRadio Music Awards	2021	Himself	Latin Pop/Reggaeton Artist of the Year	Nominated	
iHeartRadio Music Awards	2021	"Caramelo"	Latin Pop/Reggaeton Song of the Year	Nominated	
Joox Thailand Music Awards	2022	"SG" (with DJ Snake, Megan Thee Stallion and Lisa)	International Song of the Year	Nominated	
Latin American Music Awards	2017	Himself	New Artist of the Year	Won	
Latin American Music Awards	2018	Himself	Artist of the Year	Nominated	
Latin American Music Awards	2018	Himself	Favorite Male Artist	Nominated	
Latin American Music Awards	2018	Himself	Favorite Urban Artist	Won	
Latin American Music Awards	2018	"Escápate Conmigo"	Song of the Year	Nominated	
Latin American Music Awards	2018	"Escápate Conmigo"	Favorite Urban Song	Nominated	
Latin American Music Awards	2018	"Me Niego"	Favorite Pop Song	Nominated	
Latin American Music Awards	2018	Odisea	Album of the Year	Won	
Latin American Music Awards	2018	Odisea	Favorite Urban Album	Won	
Latin American Music Awards	2018	"Sobredosis"	Favorite Tropical Song	Nominated	
Latin American Music Awards	2019	Himself	Artist of the Year	Nominated	
Latin American Music Awards	2019	Himself	Favorite Male Artist	Nominated	
Latin American Music Awards	2019	Himself	Favorite Urban Artist	Nominated	
Latin American Music Awards	2019	"Taki Taki"	Song of the Year	Won	
Latin American Music Awards	2019	"Taki Taki"	Favorite Urban Song	Won	
Latin American Music Awards	2019	"Vaina Loca"	Favorite Urban Song	Nominated	
Latin American Music Awards	2019	"Imposible"	Favorite Pop Song	Nominated	
Latin American Music Awards	2019	Aura	Album of the Year	Nominated	
Latin American Music Awards	2019	Aura	Favorite Urban Album	Nominated	
Latin American Music Awards	2021	Himself	Artist of the Year	Nominated	
Latin American Music Awards	2021	Himself	Favorite Male Artist	Nominated	
Latin American Music Awards	2021	Himself	Extraordinary Evolution Award	Won	
Latin American Music Awards	2021	"Del Mar"	Video of the Year	Nominated	
Latin American Music Awards	2021	"Mamacita"	Favorite Pop Song	Nominated	
Latin American Music Awards	2021	"Caramelo"	Collaboration of the Year	Nominated	
Latin American Music Awards	2021	"Caramelo"	Favorite Urban Song	Nominated	
Latin American Music Awards	2021	Latinosunidos	Favorite Virtual Concert	Nominated	
Latin American Music Awards	2022	"Santo"	Favorite Video	Nominated	
Latin American Music Awards	2023	Himself	Favorite Urban Artist	Nominated	
Latin American Music Awards	2023	"Arhbo"	Collaboration Crossover of the Year	Nominated	
Latin American Music Awards	2023	"Monotonía"	Best Collaboration – Tropical	Won	
Latin Grammy Awards	2018	Odisea	Best Urban Music Album	Nominated	
Latin Grammy Awards	2019	"Baila Baila Baila"	Best Urban Song	Nominated	
Latin Grammy Awards	2020	"China"	Record of the Year	Nominated	
Latin Grammy Awards	2020	"China"	Best Urban Fusion/Performance	Nominated	
Latin Grammy Awards	2020	"Yo x Ti, Tu x Mi"	Best Urban Fusion/Performance	Won	
Latin Grammy Awards	2020	"Te Soñé De Nuevo"	Best Reggaeton Performance	Nominated	
Latin Grammy Awards	2020	"Si Te Vas"	Best Reggaeton Performance	Nominated	
Latin Grammy Awards	2020	Nibiru	Best Urban Music Album	Nominated	
Latin Grammy Awards	2020	"Adicto"	Best Urban Song	Nominated	
Latin Grammy Awards	2020	"Yo x Ti, Tu x Mi"	Best Urban Song	Won	
Latin Grammy Awards	2021	ENOC	Best Urban Music Album	Nominated	
Latin Grammy Awards	2021	"Caramelo"	Best Reggaeton Performance	Nominated	
Latin Grammy Awards	2022	Aguilera (as a featured artist)	Album of the Year	Nominated	
Latin Grammy Awards	2022	Santo (with Christina Aguilera)	Best Urban Fusion/Performance	Nominated	
Latin Grammy Awards	2023	"Hey Mor"	Best Reggaeton Performance	Nominated	
LOS40 Music Awards	2018	"Me niego"	LOS40 Global Show Award	Won	
LOS40 Music Awards	2019	"Taki Taki"	LOS40 Global Show Award	Nominated	
LOS40 Music Awards	2020	Himself	Best Urban Act	Nominated	
LOS40 Music Awards	2022	Himself	Best Live Act	Nominated	
LOS40 Music Awards	2022	"Nos comemos"	Best Collaboration	Nominated	
LOS40 Music Awards	2023	Himself	Best Live Act	Nominated	
LOS40 Music Awards	2023	Himself	Best Urban Act or Producer	Nominated	
LOS40 Music Awards	2023	Himself	Golden Music Award	Won	
LOS40 Music Awards	2023	Afro	Best Album	Nominated	
LOS40 Music Awards	2023	"Hey Mor"	Best Urban Collaboration	Won	
LOS40 Music Awards	2023	"Eva Longoria"	Best Urban Song	Nominated	
LOS40's Urban Music Awards	2019	"Baila Baila Baila"	Best Video	Pending	
MTV Europe Music Awards	2019	Himself	Best Caribbean Act	Nominated	
MTV Europe Music Awards	2020	Himself	Best Latin	Nominated	
MTV Europe Music Awards	2020	Himself	Best Latin America Caribbean Act	Nominated	
MTV Millennial Awards	2018	Himself	Urban Explosion	Nominated	
MTV Millennial Awards	2018	"Criminal" (with Natti Natasha)	Collaboration of the Year	Nominated	
MTV Millennial Awards	2018	"Me Niego" (with Reik & Wisin)	Collaboration of the Year	Nominated	
MTV Millennial Awards	2019	Himself	Artist MIAW	Nominated	
MTV Millennial Awards	2019	"Baila Baila Baila"	Hit of the Year	Nominated	
MTV Millennial Awards	2019	"Taki Taki" (with DJ Snake, Selena Gomez & Cardi B)	Music-Ship of the Year	Won	
MTV Millennial Awards	2023	"Hey Mor" (with Feid)	Reggaeton Hit	Nominated	
MTV Millennial Awards Brazil	2019	"Taki Taki" (with DJ Snake, Selena Gomez & Cardi B)	Global Hit	Nominated	
MTV Video Music Awards	2019	"Taki Taki" (with DJ Snake, Selena Gomez & Cardi B)	Best Dance	Nominated	
MTV Video Music Awards	2020	"Mamacita" (with Black Eyed Peas & J. Rey Soul)	Best Latin	Nominated	
MTV Video Music Awards	2020	"China" (with Anuel AA, Daddy Yankee, Karol G & Ozuna)	Best Latin	Nominated	
NRJ DJ Awards	2019	"Taki Taki" (with DJ Snake, Selena Gomez & Cardi B)	Club Hit of the Year	Nominated	
Premios Juventud	2017	Himself	Breakthourgh Artist	Won	
Premios Juventud	2019	Himself	Singer, Songwriter, Producer	Nominated	
Premios Juventud	2019	"Baila Baila Baila"	Traffic Jam Song	Nominated	
Premios Juventud	2019	"Baila Baila Baila"	Sick Dance Routine	Nominated	
Premios Juventud	2019	"Imposible" (with Luis Fonsi)	Singing in the Shower	Nominated	
Premios Juventud	2019	"Taki Taki" (with DJ Snake, Selena Gomez & Cardi B)	This Is a 'BTS'	Won	
Premios Juventud	2020	"China" (with Anuel AA, Daddy Yankee, Karol G & Ozuna)	The Perfect Mix	Won	
Premios Juventud	2020	"China" (with Anuel AA, Daddy Yankee, Karol G & Ozuna)	Traffic Jam Song	Won	
Premios Juventud	2021	"Caramelo (Remix)" (with Karol G & Myke Towers)	Song with the Best Collaboration	Nominated	
Premios Juventud	2021	"Del Mar" (with Doja Cat & Sia)	Collaboration OMG	Nominated	
Premios Juventud	2021	"Mamacita" (with Black Eyed Peas & J. Rey Soul)	Collaboration OMG	Nominated	
Premios Juventud	2022	"Emojis de Corazones" (with Wisin & Jhayco)	The Perfect Mix	Nominated	
Premios Juventud	2022	"Señor Juez" (with Antony Santos)	Best Tropical Mix	Nominated	
Premios Juventud	2022	"Santo" (with Christina Aguilera)	Collaboration OMG	Nominated	
Premios Juventud	2022	"SG" (with DJ Snake, Megan Thee Stallion & Lisa)	Collaboration OMG	Nominated	
Premios Juventud	2023	Himself	Artist of the Youth – Male	Nominated	
Premios Juventud	2023	"Deprimida"	Best Urban Track	Nominated	
Premios Juventud	2023	"Hey Mor" (with Feid)	Best Urban Mix	Won	
Premios Juventud	2023	"Nos Comemos" (with Tiago PZK)	Best Urban Mix	Nominated	
Premios Juventud	2023	Ozutochi	Best Urban Album – Male	Nominated	
Premios Juventud	2023	"Chao Bebe" (with Ovy on the Drums)	Best Pop/Urban Song	Nominated	
Premios Juventud	2023	"Monotonía" (with Shakira)	Best Tropical Mix	Won	
Premios Juventud	2024	Cosmo	Best Urban Album	Nominated	
Premios Juventud	2024	"Vocation" (with David Guetta)	OMG Collaboration	Nominated	
Premios Juventud	2024	"Vocation" (with David Guetta)	Favorite Dance Track	Nominated	
Premios Juventud	2024	"Tucu" (with Amarion)	Best Urban Mix	Nominated	
Premios Juventud	2025	"Tengo un Plan (Remix)" (with Key-Key)	Afrobeat of the Year	Nominated	
Premios Juventud	2025	"Gata Only (Remix)" (with Floyymenor & Anitta)	Best Urban Mix	Nominated	
Premios Juventud	2026	Stendhal	Album of the Year	Pending	
Premios Juventud	2026	Stendhal	Best Urban Album	Pending	
Premios Juventud	2026	"Enemigos" (with Beéle & Ovy on the Drums)	Afrobeat of the Year	Pending	
Premios Juventud	2026	"Una Aventura"	Best Urban Track	Pending	
Premios Lo Nuestro	2019	Himself	Male Urban Artist of the Year	Won	
Premios Lo Nuestro	2019	"Taki Taki" (with DJ Snake, Selena Gomez & Cardi B)	Crossover Collaboration of the Year	Won	
Premios Lo Nuestro	2019	"Me Niego" (with Reik & Wisin)	Single of the Year	Won	
Premios Lo Nuestro	2019	"Me Niego" (with Reik & Wisin)	Collaboration of the Year	Won	
Premios Lo Nuestro	2019	"Me Niego" (with Reik & Wisin)	Song of the Year	Won	
Premios Lo Nuestro	2019	"Me Niego" (with Reik & Wisin)	Pop/Rock Song of the Year	Nominated	
Premios Lo Nuestro	2019	"Me Niego" (with Reik & Wisin)	Pop/Rock Collaboration of the Year	Won	
Premios Lo Nuestro	2019	"Te Boté (Remix)" (with Nio Garcia, Casper Mágico, Darell, Bad Bunny & Nicky Jam)	Remix of the Year	Won	
Premios Lo Nuestro	2019	"Única"	Urban Song of the Year	Nominated	
Premios Lo Nuestro	2019	Aura Tour	Tour of the Year	Won	
Premios Lo Nuestro	2020	Himself	Male Urban Artist of the Year	Nominated	
Premios Lo Nuestro	2020	"Baila Baila Baila (Remix)" (with Daddy Yankee, J Balvin, Anuel AA & Farruko)	Remix of the Year	Nominated	
Premios Lo Nuestro	2020	"Otro Trago (Remix)" (with Sech, Darell, Nicky Jam & Anuel AA)	Remix of the Year	Nominated	
Premios Lo Nuestro	2020	"Imposible" (with Luis Fonsi)	Pop/Rock Collaboration of the Year	Nominated	
Premios Lo Nuestro	2020	"Baila Baila Baila"	Urban Song of the Year	Nominated	
Premios Lo Nuestro	2020	"Te Robaré" (with Nicky Jam)	Urban Song of the Year	Nominated	
Premios Lo Nuestro	2020	"Te Robaré" (with Nicky Jam)	Urban Collaboration of the Year	Nominated	
Premios Lo Nuestro	2021	Himself	Artist of the Year	Nominated	
Premios Lo Nuestro	2021	Himself	Male Urban Artist of the Year	Nominated	
Premios Lo Nuestro	2021	"Fantasía"	Song of the Year	Nominated	
Premios Lo Nuestro	2021	"Fantasía"	Urban Song of the Year	Nominated	
Premios Lo Nuestro	2021	"Caramelo (Remix)" (with Karol G & Myke Towers)	Remix of the Year	Nominated	
Premios Lo Nuestro	2021	"La Cama (Remix)" (with Lunay, Myke Towers, Chencho Corleone & Rauw Alejandro)	Remix of the Year	Nominated	
Premios Lo Nuestro	2021	"Mamacita" (with Black Eyed Peas & J. Rey Soul)	Corssover Collaboration of the Year	Nominated	
Premios Lo Nuestro	2021	Nibiru	Urban Album of the Year	Nominated	
Premios Lo Nuestro	2022	Himself	Male Urban Artist of the Year	Nominated	
Premios Lo Nuestro	2022	"Del Mar" (with Doja Cat & Sia)	Crossover Collaboration of the Year	Nominated	
Premios Lo Nuestro	2022	"Travesuras (Remix)" (with Nio Garcia, Casper Magico, Wisin & Yandel & Myke Towers)	Remix of the Year	Nominated	
Premios Lo Nuestro	2022	"Antes" (with Anuel AA)	Urban Song of the Year	Nominated	
Premios Lo Nuestro	2022	"Antes" (with Anuel AA)	Urban Collaboration of the Year	Nominated	
Premios Lo Nuestro	2022	"Señor Juez" (with Antony Santos)	Tropical Collaboration of the Year	Nominated	
Premios Lo Nuestro	2023	Himself	Male Urban Artist of the Year	Nominated	
Premios Lo Nuestro	2023	"SG" (with DJ Snake, Megan Thee Stallion & Lisa)	Crossover Collaboration of the Year	Nominated	
Premios Lo Nuestro	2023	"Santo" (with Christina Aguilera)	The Perfect Mix of the Year	Nominated	
Premios Lo Nuestro	2023	"Deprimida"	Urban Song of the Year	Nominated	
Premios Lo Nuestro	2023	"Emoji de Corazones" (with Wisin & Jhayco)	Urban Collaboration of the Year	Nominated	
Premios Lo Nuestro	2023	"Nos Comemos" (with Tiago PZK)	Urban Collaboration of the Year	Nominated	
Premios Lo Nuestro	2023	"La Funka"	Urban/Pop Song of the Year	Nominated	
Premios Lo Nuestro	2023	"Señor Juez" (with Antony Santos)	Tropical Collaboration of the Year	Nominated	
Premios Lo Nuestro	2024	Himself	Artist of the Year	Nominated	
Premios Lo Nuestro	2024	Himself	Male Urban Artist of the Year	Nominated	
Premios Lo Nuestro	2024	"Somos Iguales" (with Tokischa)	Crossover Collaboration of the Year	Nominated	
Premios Lo Nuestro	2024	Ozutochi	Urban Album of the Year	Nominated	
Premios Lo Nuestro	2024	"Hey Mor" (with Feid)	Urban Collaboration of the Year	Nominated	
Premios Lo Nuestro	2024	"Tucu" (with Amarion)	Urban/Pop Song of the Year	Nominated	
Premios Lo Nuestro	2025	Himself	Male Urban Artist of the Year	Nominated	
Premios Lo Nuestro	2025	"Baccarat"	Urban Song of the Year	Nominated	
Premios Lo Nuestro	2025	"Vocation" (with David Guetta)	Crossover Collaboration of the Year	Nominated	
Premios Lo Nuestro	2025	"Vocation" (with David Guetta)	Pop-Urban/Dance Song of the Year	Nominated	
Premios Lo Nuestro	2025	"Otra Vibra" (with Luar La L)	Urban Collaboration of the Year	Nominated	
Premios Lo Nuestro	2026	“Sirenita”	Pop/Urban Song of the Year	Nominated	
Premios Odeón	2020	Himself	Latin Artist of the Year	Nominated	
Premios Odeón	2020	"Yo x Ti, Tu x Mi" (with Rosalía)	Best Song of the Year	Nominated	
Premios Odeón	2020	"Yo x Ti, Tu x Mi" (with Rosalía)	Best Video of the Year	Nominated	
Premios Odeón	2021	Himself	Latin Artist of the Year	Nominated	
Premios Odeón	2022	Los Dioses	Latin Album of the Year	Nominated	
Premios Tu Música Urbano	2019	Himself	Puerto Rican Male Urban Artist	Won	
Premios Tu Música Urbano	2019	Himself	Artist of the Year	Won	
Premios Tu Música Urbano	2019	Himself	Premio Humanitarian of the Year	Nominated	
Premios Tu Música Urbano	2019	"Vaina Loca" (with Manuel Turizo)	International Urban Pop Song	Nominated	
Premios Tu Música Urbano	2019	"Imposible" (with Luis Fonsi)	International Urban Pop Song	Nominated	
Premios Tu Música Urbano	2019	"Taki Taki" (with DJ Snake, Selena Gomez & Cardi B)	International Urban Pop Song	Nominated	
Premios Tu Música Urbano	2019	"Me Niego" (with Reik & Wisin)	International Urban Pop Song	Nominated	
Premios Tu Música Urbano	2019	"Me Niego" (with Reik & Wisin)	International Collaboration of the Year	Nominated	
Premios Tu Música Urbano	2019	"Vaina Loca" (with Manuel Turizo)	International Collaboration of the Year	Won	
Premios Tu Música Urbano	2019	"Vaina Loca" (with Manuel Turizo)	International Video of the Year	Nominated	
Premios Tu Música Urbano	2019	"Asesina (Remix)" (with Brytiago, Darell, Daddy Yankee & Anuel AA)	International Video of the Year	Nominated	
Premios Tu Música Urbano	2019	"Imposible" (with Luis Fonsi)	International Video of the Year	Nominated	
Premios Tu Música Urbano	2019	"El Farsante" (with Romeo Santos)	International Video of the Year	Won	
Premios Tu Música Urbano	2019	"Te Boté (Remix)" (with Nio Garcia, Casper Mágico, Darell, Bad Bunny & Nicky Jam)	International Video of the Year	Nominated	
Premios Tu Música Urbano	2019	"Te Boté (Remix)" (with Nio Garcia, Casper Mágico, Darell, Bad Bunny & Nicky Jam)	International Remix of the Year	Won	
Premios Tu Música Urbano	2019	"Asesina (Remix)" (with Brytiago, Darell, Daddy Yankee & Anuel AA)	International Remix of the Year	Nominated	
Premios Tu Música Urbano	2019	"Única"	Song of the Year	Nominated	
Premios Tu Música Urbano	2019	Aura	International Album of the Year	Won	
Premios Tu Música Urbano	2019	Aura Tour	Concert of the Year	Nominated	
Premios Tu Música Urbano	2020	Himself	Artist of the Year	Nominated	
Premios Tu Música Urbano	2020	Himself	Top Artist — Male	Won	
Premios Tu Música Urbano	2020	"Baila Baila Baila"	Top Song — Male	Nominated	
Premios Tu Música Urbano	2020	"Baila Baila Baila"	Song of the Year	Nominated	
Premios Tu Música Urbano	2020	"China" (with Anuel AA, Daddy Yankee, Karol G & Ozuna)	Video of the Year	Nominated	
Premios Tu Música Urbano	2020	"China" (with Anuel AA, Daddy Yankee, Karol G & Ozuna)	Collaboration of the Year	Won	
Premios Tu Música Urbano	2020	"Adicto" (with Tainy & Anuel AA)	Collaboration of the Year	Nominated	
Premios Tu Música Urbano	2020	"Adicto" (with Tainy & Anuel AA)	Video of the Year	Won	
Premios Tu Música Urbano	2020	"Yo x Ti, Tu x Mi" (with Rosalía)	Video of the Year	Nominated	
Premios Tu Música Urbano	2020	"Yo x Ti, Tu x Mi" (with Rosalía)	Top Song — Pop Urban	Nominated	
Premios Tu Música Urbano	2020	"Easy (Remix)" (with Jhayco)	Remix of the Year — New Generation	Nominated	
Premios Tu Música Urbano	2020	"Otro Trago (Remix)" (with Sech, Darell, Nicky Jam & Anuel AA)	Remix of the Year	Nominated	
Premios Tu Música Urbano	2020	"Si Te Vas" (with Sech)	Collaboration of the Year — New Generation	Won	
Premios Tu Música Urbano	2020	"Aventura" (with Lunay & Anuel AA)	Collaboration of the Year — New Generation	Nominated	
Premios Tu Música Urbano	2020	Nibiru	Top Album — Male	Nominated	
Premios Tu Música Urbano	2022	Himself	Top Artist — Male	Nominated	
Premios Tu Música Urbano	2022	Himself	Top Social Artist	Nominated	
Premios Tu Música Urbano	2022	"SG" (with DJ Snake, Megan Thee Stallion & Lisa)	Top Latin Crossover Song	Nominated	
Premios Tu Música Urbano	2022	"Deprimida"	Top Song — Pop Urban	Nominated	
Premios Tu Música Urbano	2022	"Señor Juez" (with Antony Santos)	Top Song — Tropical Urban	Nominated	
Premios Tu Música Urbano	2022	"Travesuras (Remix)" (with Nio Garcia, Casper Magico, Wisin & Yandel & Myke Towers)	Top Song — Tropical Urban	Nominated	
Premios Tu Música Urbano	2022	"G Wagon"	Top Song — Trap	Nominated	
Premios Tu Música Urbano	2022	"La Funka"	Video of the Year	Nominated	
Premios Tu Música Urbano	2023	Himself	Artist of the Year	Nominated	
Premios Tu Música Urbano	2023	"Hey Mor" (with Feid)	Collaboration of the Year	Nominated	
Premios Tu Música Urbano	2023	OzuTochi	Album of the Year – Male Artist	Nominated	
Premios Tu Música Urbano	2023	Ozutochi World Tour	Concert/Tour of the Year	Nominated	
Premios Tu Música Urbano	2025	"Tengo un Plan (Remix)" (with Key-Key)	Remix of the Year	Nominated	
Premios Tu Música Urbano	2026	Himself	Top Artist — Afrobeat	Won	
Premios Tu Música Urbano	2026	"Enemigos" (with Beéle & Ovy on the Drums)	Collaboration of the Year	Nominated	
Premios Tu Música Urbano	2026	Stendhal	Top Album — Various Artist	Won	
Soberano Awards	2018	"Criminal" (with Natti Natasha)	Collaboration of the Year	Won´	
Teen Choice Awards	2019	"Baila Baila Baila (Remix)" (with Daddy Yankee, J Balvin, Anuel AA & Farruko)	Choice Latin Song	Nominated	
Teen Choice Awards	2019	"Te Robaré" (with Nicky Jam)	Choice Latin Song	Nominated	
