= List of Billboard Hot Latin Songs and Latin Airplay number ones of 2018 =

The Billboard Hot Latin Songs and Latin Airplay are charts that rank the best-performing Latin songs in the United States and are both published weekly by Billboard magazine. The Hot Latin Songs ranks the best-performing Spanish-language songs in the country based digital downloads, streaming, and airplay from all radio stations. The Latin Airplay chart ranks the most-played songs on Spanish-language radio stations in the United States.

== Chart history ==
Chart history
Issue date	Hot Latin Songs			Latin Airplay		
Issue date	Title	Artist(s)	Ref.	Title	Artist(s)	Ref.
January 3	"Mi Gente"	J Balvin and Willy William featuring Beyoncé		"Perro Fiel"	Shakira featuring Nicky Jam	
January 6	"Despacito"	Luis Fonsi and Daddy Yankee featuring Justin Bieber		"Perro Fiel"	Shakira featuring Nicky Jam	
January 13	"Despacito"	Luis Fonsi and Daddy Yankee featuring Justin Bieber		"Robarte un Beso"	Carlos Vives and Sebastián Yatra	
January 20	"Despacito"	Luis Fonsi and Daddy Yankee featuring Justin Bieber		"Échame la Culpa"	Luis Fonsi and Demi Lovato	
January 27	"Despacito"	Luis Fonsi and Daddy Yankee featuring Justin Bieber		"Corazón"	Maluma featuring Nego do Borel	
February 3	"Despacito"	Luis Fonsi and Daddy Yankee featuring Justin Bieber		"Amor, Amor, Amor"	Jennifer Lopez featuring Wisin	
February 10	"Despacito"	Luis Fonsi and Daddy Yankee featuring Justin Bieber		"Corazón"	Maluma featuring Nego do Borel	
February 17	"Despacito"	Luis Fonsi and Daddy Yankee featuring Justin Bieber		"Mayores"	Becky G featuring Bad Bunny	
February 24	"Despacito"	Luis Fonsi and Daddy Yankee featuring Justin Bieber		"Cásate Conmigo"	Silvestre Dangond and Nicky Jam	
March 3	"Despacito"	Luis Fonsi and Daddy Yankee featuring Justin Bieber		"La Modelo"	Ozuna and Cardi B	
March 10	"Despacito"	Luis Fonsi and Daddy Yankee featuring Justin Bieber		"Todo Comienza en la Disco"	Wisin featuring Yandel and Daddy Yankee	
March 17	"Despacito"	Luis Fonsi and Daddy Yankee featuring Justin Bieber		"Dura"	Daddy Yankee	
March 24	"Despacito"	Luis Fonsi and Daddy Yankee featuring Justin Bieber		"Machika"	J Balvin, Jeon, and Anitta	
March 31	"Despacito"	Luis Fonsi and Daddy Yankee featuring Justin Bieber		"El Baño"	Enrique Iglesias featuring Bad Bunny	
April 7	"Despacito"	Luis Fonsi and Daddy Yankee featuring Justin Bieber		"Dura"	Daddy Yankee	
April 14	"Despacito"	Luis Fonsi and Daddy Yankee featuring Justin Bieber		"Dura"	Daddy Yankee	
April 21	"Despacito"	Luis Fonsi and Daddy Yankee featuring Justin Bieber		"Dura"	Daddy Yankee	
April 28	"Despacito"	Luis Fonsi and Daddy Yankee featuring Justin Bieber		"X"	Nicky Jam and J Balvin	
May 5	"X"	Nicky Jam and J Balvin		"Dura"	Daddy Yankee	
May 12	"Dame Tu Cosita"	El Chombo featuring Cutty Ranks		"X"	Nicky Jam and J Balvin	
May 19	"Dame Tu Cosita"	El Chombo featuring Cutty Ranks		"Fiebre"	Ricky Martin featuring Wisin & Yandel	
May 26	"Te Boté"	Casper Mágico, Nio García, Darell, Nicky Jam, Ozuna and Bad Bunny		"Me Niego"	Reik featuring Ozuna and Wisin	
June 2	"Te Boté"	Casper Mágico, Nio García, Darell, Nicky Jam, Ozuna and Bad Bunny		"El Préstamo"	Maluma	
June 9	"Te Boté"	Casper Mágico, Nio García, Darell, Nicky Jam, Ozuna and Bad Bunny		"El Préstamo"	Maluma	
June 16	"Te Boté"	Casper Mágico, Nio García, Darell, Nicky Jam, Ozuna and Bad Bunny		"Se Acabó el Amor"	Abraham Mateo, Yandel, and Jennifer Lopez	
June 23	"Te Boté"	Casper Mágico, Nio García, Darell, Nicky Jam, Ozuna and Bad Bunny		"Me Niego"	Reik featuring Ozuna and Wisin	
June 30	"Te Boté"	Casper Mágico, Nio García, Darell, Nicky Jam, Ozuna and Bad Bunny		"La Player (Bandolera)"	Zion & Lennox	
July 7	"Te Boté"	Casper Mágico, Nio García, Darell, Nicky Jam, Ozuna and Bad Bunny		"Ambiente"	J Balvin	
July 14	"X"	Nicky Jam and J Balvin		"El Anillo"	Jennifer Lopez	
July 21	"Te Boté"	Casper Mágico, Nio García, Darell, Nicky Jam, Ozuna and Bad Bunny		"Sobredosis"	Romeo Santos featuring Ozuna	
July 28	"Te Boté"	Casper Mágico, Nio García, Darell, Nicky Jam, Ozuna and Bad Bunny		"Unica"	Ozuna	
August 4	"Despacito"	Luis Fonsi and Daddy Yankee featuring Justin Bieber		"Unica"	Ozuna	
August 11	"Despacito"	Luis Fonsi and Daddy Yankee featuring Justin Bieber		"Sin Pijama"	Becky G and Natti Natasha	
August 18	"Despacito"	Luis Fonsi and Daddy Yankee featuring Justin Bieber		"Quisiera Alejarme"	Wisin featuring Ozuna	
August 25	"Te Boté"	Casper Mágico, Nio García, Darell, Nicky Jam, Ozuna and Bad Bunny		"Mi Cama"	Karol G and J Balvin featuring Nicky Jam	
September 1	"Despacito"	Luis Fonsi and Daddy Yankee featuring Justin Bieber		"El Clavo"	Prince Royce featuring Maluma	
September 8	"Te Boté"	Casper Mágico, Nio García, Darell, Nicky Jam, Ozuna and Bad Bunny		"X"	Nicky Jam and J Balvin	
September 15	"Bebe"	6ix9ine featuring Anuel AA		"Calypso"	Luis Fonsi featuring Stefflon Don or Karol G	
September 22	"Te Boté"	Casper Mágico, Nio García, Darell, Nicky Jam, Ozuna and Bad Bunny		"Hoy Tengo Tiempo (Pinta Sensual)"	Carlos Vives	
September 29	"Te Boté"	Casper Mágico, Nio García, Darell, Nicky Jam, Ozuna and Bad Bunny		"Clandestino"	Shakira and Maluma	
October 6	"Te Boté"	Casper Mágico, Nio García, Darell, Nicky Jam, Ozuna and Bad Bunny		"Vaina Loca"	Ozuna and Manuel Turizo	
October 13	"Taki Taki"	DJ Snake featuring Selena Gomez, Ozuna and Cardi B		"Dinero"	Jennifer Lopez featuring DJ Khaled and Cardi B	
October 20	"Taki Taki"	DJ Snake featuring Selena Gomez, Ozuna and Cardi B		"Vaina Loca"	Ozuna and Manuel Turizo	
October 27	"Mia"	Bad Bunny featuring Drake		"Se Vuelve Loca"	CNCO	
November 3	"Taki Taki"	DJ Snake featuring Selena Gomez, Ozuna and Cardi B		"Justicia"	Silvestre Dangond and Natti Natasha	
November 10	"Mia"	Bad Bunny featuring Drake		"Mala Mía"	Maluma	
November 17	"Taki Taki"	DJ Snake featuring Selena Gomez, Ozuna and Cardi B		"Zum"	Daddy Yankee, RKM & Ken-Y, Arcángel	
November 24	"Taki Taki"	DJ Snake featuring Selena Gomez, Ozuna and Cardi B		"No Es Justo"	J Balvin and Zion & Lennox	
December 1	"Mia"	Bad Bunny featuring Drake		"Centavito"	Romeo Santos	
December 8	"Mia"	Bad Bunny featuring Drake		"Taki Taki"	DJ Snake featuring Selena Gomez, Ozuna and Cardi B	
December 15	"Taki Taki"	DJ Snake featuring Selena Gomez, Ozuna and Cardi B		"Ya No Tiene Novio"	Sebastián Yatra and Mau y Ricky	
December 22	"Taki Taki"	DJ Snake featuring Selena Gomez, Ozuna and Cardi B		"Hola"	Zion & Lennox	
December 29	"Taki Taki"	DJ Snake featuring Selena Gomez, Ozuna and Cardi B		"Mia"	Bad Bunny featuring Drake	

== Weeks at number one ==
Number of weeks	Song	Artist(s)
21	"Despacito"	Luis Fonsi and Daddy Yankee featuring Justin Bieber
14	"Te Boté"	Casper Mágico, Nio García, Darell, Nicky Jam, Ozuna, and Bad Bunny
12	"Taki Taki"	DJ Snake featuring Selena Gomez, Ozuna and Cardi B
4	"Mia"	Bad Bunny featuring Drake
2	"X"	Nicky Jam and J Balvin
2	"Dame Tu Cosita"	El Chombo featuring Cutty Ranks
1	"Mi Gente"	J Balvin and Willy Wiliam featuring Beyoncé
1	"Bebe"	6ix9ine featuring Anuel AA
