= Golden (Romeo Santos album) =

Studio album by Romeo Santos
- Released: July 21, 2017
- Recorded: August 2016 – May 2017
- Studios: The Castle (Yorktown Heights); Hit Factory Criteria Studios (Miami)
- Genres: Bachata; tropical
- Length: 65:20
- Label: Sony Latin
- Producers: Romeo Santos (also exec.); Allen Ritter; Andrew Cedar; Boi-1da; Frank Dukes; Illangelo; Illmind; Matetraxx; Nely; Saga WhiteBlack; Swizz Beatz; Tainy; Vinylz

Romeo Santos chronology
Formula, Vol. 2 (2014)	Golden (2017)	Utopía (2019)

Singles from Golden
- 1. "Héroe Favorito" Released: February 10, 2017; 2. "Imitadora" Released: June 23, 2017; 3. "Bella y Sensual" Released: October 27, 2017; 4. "Sobredosis" Released: February 14, 2018; 5. "Carmín" Released: June 13, 2018; 6. "Centavito" Released: July 21, 2018

Golden is the third studio album by American singer Romeo Santos, released on July 21, 2017 by Sony Music Latin. The album production mixed bachata with other genres such as jazz, bolero and reggaeton. The majority of the tracks were written by Santos and co-produced with sound engineer Mate Traxx (Iván Chévere). It encompasses bachata treated with synthesizer, piano, hyperkinetic percussion and guitars. It contains 18 tracks exploring lyrics ranging from hate, criticism, tabloid rumors to love and sex and features guest appearances from Swizz Beatz, Juan Luis Guerra, Ozuna, Nicky Jam, Daddy Yankee, Julio Iglesias and Jessie Reyez. It also features production from Santos, Allen Ritter, Boi-1da, Frank Dukes, Illangelo, Illmind, Matetraxx, Swizz Beatz, Tainy, and Vinylz, among others.

Golden was received well by music critics, earning a nomination for Best Contemporary Tropical Album at the 19th Annual Latin Grammy Awards, becoming Santos' first nomination by The Latin Recording Academy. Also, it was nominated for Top Latin Album at the 2018 Billboard Music Awards and won Tropical Album of the Year at the 2018 Billboard Latin Music Awards.

Golden debuted at number 10 on US Billboard 200 and at number one on US Billboard Top Latin Albums, staying there for four consecutive weeks. It was the best-selling tropical album in the United States of 2017 and 2018. Eventually, it was certified fourteen times platinum (latin filed) by the RIAA. Also, it debuted at number one on Mexico and Argentina album charts and reached the Top 10 at Chile, Spain and South America. Golden was also certified gold in Mexico, Chile and Argentina. To promote the album, Santos embarked on the Golden Tour, which had an attendance of around one million fans and received several nominations for Best Tour.

== Background ==
Following the release of Formula, Vol. 2 (2014), Santos embarked on Vol. 2 Tour to promote the album. Eventually, the album was the best-selling Latin album of 2014 and 2015. The tour was a box office success selling out arenas and stadiums all over America and Europe, including Yankee Stadium in New York and a 360 concert in Santo Domingo with record of attendance. The tour wrapped up on August 27, 2016 in Punta Cana, Dominican Republic.

On June 8, 2016, Santos and Jay-Z launch Roic Nation Lation a Latin division within Roc Nation with Santos as a CEO. On October 28, 2016 Santos posted a photo on social media revealing that he was recording a new album title of his next album Golden set to release on 2017. On February 19, 2017 Santos performed on a Pop-Up Show in Los Angeles to promote the lead single "Heroe Favorito". On April 1, 2017 Santos posted a photo with Nicky Jam announcing that he was working on his next single. The recording seasons of the album ended on May 23, 2022 according to the artist. On June 20, 2017, Santos announced the release date of the album, the same date of his 36th birthday.

== Singles ==
"Héroe Favorito" is the first single from the album. In the song, Santos wishes to be a super hero for a woman he is in love with. He collaborated with Marvel to design the artwork for the single's cover. The music video was released on Valentine's Day 2017. In the music video, he plays the role of a super hero. The song peaked at number 2 on the Billboard Hot Latin Songs chart and at number 1 on the Billboard Latin and Tropical Airplay charts.

"Imitadora" is the second single. It was released on June 23, 2017. The music video was released on July 18, 2017. The song peaked at number 1 on the Billboard Hot Latin Songs chart and at number 1 on the Billboard Latin and Tropical Airplay charts.

"Bella y Sensual" is the third single features Reggaeton rappers Daddy Yankee & Nicky Jam. The music video was released on November 24, 2017 and it features Dominican model Yovanna Ventura, and Dominican dancers Dahiana Elizabeth and Cristal Sicard as the lead females. The song peaked at number 1 on the Billboard Hot Latin Songs chart, at number 6 on the Billboard Latin Rhythm Airplay chart, and at number 1 Tropical Airplay chart.

"Sobredosis" is the fourth single and features Reggaeton singer and rapper Ozuna. The music video was originally released on February 14, 2018. It was re-edited and released on February 21, 2018, due to the original being to explicit, thus being removed from YouTube. The song peaked at number 13 on the Billboard Hot Latin Songs chart and at number 1 on the Billboard Latin and Tropical Airplay charts. It won Tropical Song of the Year at the 2019 Billboard Latin Music Awards.

"Carmín" is the fifth single and features Dominican singer Juan Luis Guerra. The music video was released on June 13, 2018.

"Centavito" is the sixth single. The music video was released on July 21, 2018. The song peaked at number 20 on the Billboard Hot Latin Songs chart and at number 1 on the Billboard Latin and Tropical Airplay charts.

== Promotion and tour ==
To promote the lead single of the album, Santos performed on several shows and performed a Pop-up show in Los Angeles, Miami and New York in February 2017 in partnership with Tidal. In August 2017, Santos hosted a series of private shows with Spanish Broadcasting System (SBS). The shows were invitation-only concerts in three major U.S. cities: New York, Miami and Los Angeles. The three concerts took place August 9, 11 and 15.

Following the release of the album, several magazines such as Billboard, Rolling Stone and Vibre gave the front cover and articles with details of the albums and interviews with Santos. To promote the album, Santos embarked on the Golden Tour. The tour started at Grand Theater at Foxwoods in Connecticut on February 13, 2018, and ended at Coliseo Jose Miguel Agrelot, San Juan, Puerto Rico, on February 9, 2019.

== Critical reception ==
Professional ratings
Review scores
Source	Rating
AllMusic	3/5 stars
Pitchfork	7.6/10

Golden receive positive reviews by the critics. Mariano Prunes from Allmusic gave three out five stars to the album stating "Santos sticks to his new bachata sound, but with diminishing returns this time. For someone who has made his name by mixing bachata with other genres, there is a noticeable sameness to much of this material". The author praised the instrumentalization and the featured guest. However, he stated that it had mixed results. Matthew Ismael Ruiz from Pitchfork gave the album 7.6 out 10 stating "The Bronx-born pop star expands his musical empire on Golden. But for the all the album’s myriad sounds, its roots are firmly planted in bachata, the sounds of the campo".

== Commercial performance ==
Golden debut at number 10 on the US Billboard 200 selling over 36,000 units in its first week, earning the highest first week sales of 2017 for a Latin Studio Album. It was his third consecutive album to debut at the top 10 following Formula Vol. 1 (2011) and Formula Vol. 2 (2014). Also, it bows at number one of Top Latin Albums and remained for four consecutive weeks. It remained the top-selling album on the chart for 37 consecutive weeks in 2017 and 17 non-consecutive weeks in 2018 at Billboard Tropical Albums. It was the best performing tropical album of 2017 and 2018 and was certified fourteen times platinum (latin field) for selling over 840,000 units.

In Mexico, it debuted at number one on the album chart and was certified gold by the AMPROFOM for selling 30,000 units. In Argentina, it debuted at number one and was certified gold by the CAPIF for selling over 20,000 copies. In Spain, it debuted at number three and was certified platinum. In Chile, it reached number eight at retalins album chart according to Punto Musical and was certified Gold. According to Presario it was at number two at the weekly South America album charts. In Europe, it charted moderately reaching number 37 in Switzerland, 68 in Italy, 74 in Netherlands and 104 in Belgium. Globally, it reached the top position of digital retails in seven countries and top 10 in 16 territories including Argentina, Spain, United States, Italy and México.

== Track listing ==
Credits adapted from the album's liner notes. All tracks were produced by Santos, with additional production by Matetraxx, except where noted.

Golden
No.	Title	Writer(s)	Producer(s)	Length
1.	"Golden Intro"	Anthony Santos; Shaffer Smith	Romeo Santos; Andrew Cedar	2:00
2.	"Tuyo"	Santos		3:38
3.	"Perjurio"	Santos; Philip Jackson^{[a]}		3:33
4.	"Premio" (featuring Swizz Beatz)	Santos	Santos; Swizz Beatz	3:40
5.	"Carmín" (featuring Juan Luis Guerra)	Santos		3:28
6.	"Centavito"	Santos		4:22
7.	"Sobredosis" (featuring Ozuna)	Santos		3:18
8.	"El Papel, Part 1" (Versión Amante)	Santos		3:38
9.	"El Papel, Part 2" (Versión Marido)	Santos		4:41
10.	"Bella y Sensual" (with Nicky Jam and Daddy Yankee)	Santos; Nick Caminero; Ramón Rodriguez	Santos; Saga WhiteBlack; Tainy^{[b]}; Nely^{[b]}	3:24
11.	"Doble Filo"	Santos		3:58
12.	"Ay Bendito"	Santos		3:34
13.	"Héroe Favorito"	Santos		3:59
14.	"El Amigo" (featuring Julio Iglesias)	Santos		3:34
15.	"Reina De Papi"	Santos		3:57
16.	"Imitadora"	Santos; Jackson^{[a]}	Santos; Vinylz; Allen Ritter; Frank Dukes	3:54
17.	"Un Vuelo A La" (featuring Jessie Reyez)	Santos; Jessie Reyez		3:22
18.	"Sin Filtro"	Santos; Jackson^{[a]}	Boi-1da; Illangelo; Illmind; Allen Ritter; Vinylz	3:09
Total length:				65:20

Notes

- ^{^[a]} signifies a co-writer
- ^{^[b]} signifies a co-producer
- "Premio" features additional vocals from Alexander Caba and Liliana Sotelo
- "El Papel, Pt. 1 (Versión Amante)" and "El Papel, Pt. 2 (Versión Marido)" features additional vocals from Romina Faria
- "El Papel, Pt. 2 (Versión Marido)" features background vocals from Luis Figueroa-Roig
- "Doble Filo" features background vocals from Leonardo Espinosa and Leonardo Reyes Zapata
- "El Amigo" features background vocals from Karen Rodriguez and Luis Figueroa-Riog
- "Reina de Papi" features additional vocals from DJ Mad and Ayanna Caba
- "Imitadora" features background vocals from Philip Jackson
- "Un Vuelo A La" features background vocals from Joaquín Díaz, Iván Chévere and Alexander Caba

Sample credits

- "Tuyo" embodies portions of "La Alegría", composed and performed by Yasmin Levy

== Personnel ==
Credits adapted from the album's liner notes.

Performers

- Romeo Santos – primary artist
- Swizz Beatz – featured artist (track 4)
- Juan Luis Guerra – featured artist (track 5)
- Ozuna – featured artist (track 7)
- Nicky Jam – featured artist (track 10)
- Daddy Yankee – featured artist (track 10)
- Julio Iglesias – featured artist (track 14)
- Jessie Reyez – featured artist (track 17)

Musicians

- Joaquín Díaz – piano (tracks 2, 4, 5, 7–12, 15–17), keyboard (tracks 2, 3), synths (tracks 3, 5, 12, 13, 15, 16), rhodes (tracks 13, 14), keyboard strings (track 14), organ (track 17)
- Dante Rivera – bass (tracks 2, 5, 6, 8, 9, 12–14, 17)
- Alexander "ChiChi" Caba – rhythm guitar (tracks 2, 3, 5–9, 11–17), lead guitar (tracks 2–9, 11, 15–17), twelve-string guitar (tracks 5, 9)
- Daniel Luna – güira (tracks 2, 9, 13–16)
- Raúl Bier – bongo (tracks 2, 12–16)
- Guillermo Frias – conga (tracks 3, 14), bongo (track 3)
- Adam Gómez – bass (tracks 4, 7, 11, 15, 16)
- Enrique Terrero – güira (tracks 4, 7, 8, 11, 12)
- Leonardo Reyes Zapata – bongo (tracks 4, 5, 6, 7, 9, 11)
- Guido Gonzalez – flugelhorn (track 5)
- Iván Chévere – keyboard harp sound (track 6)
- Paul Castelluzzo – nylon string guitar (tracks 8, 13), jazz guitar (track 13), electric guitar (track 14)
- Marti Cuevas – flute (track 8)
- Alvin Medina – cuatro (track 12), acoustic guitar (track 12), rhythm guitar (track 12), guiro (track 12)
- Martires de Leon – lead guitar (track 14)
- JC Ulloa – engineer (track 14)
- Allen Ritter – piano (track 16), synths (track 16)

Technical

- Iván Chévere a/k/a Matetraxx – mixing engineer (tracks 1–9, 11–18), engineer (tracks 1–9, 11–18)
- Tom Brick – mastering engineer (all tracks)
- Christian "DJ Mad" Brito – engineer (track 3), assistance engineer (tracks 5, 7)
- Juan G. Rivera "Gaby Music" – mixing engineer (tracks 10), engineer (track 10)

Production

- Romeo Santos – producer (tracks 1–17)
- Andrew Cedar – producer (track 1)
- Matetraxx – co-producer (tracks 2, 3, 5–9, 11–15, 17)
- Swizz Beatz – producer (track 4)
- Saga WhiteBlack – producer (track 10)
- Tainy – co-producer (track 10)
- Nely – co-producer (track 10)
- Allen Ritter – producer (tracks 16, 18)
- Frank Dukes – producer (track 16)
- Vinylz – producer (tracks 16, 18)
- Boi-1da – producer (track 18)
- Illangelo – producer (track 18)
- Illmind – producer (track 18)

== Charts ==
=== Weekly charts ===
Chart (2017)	Peak position
Argetinan Album Chart	1
Belgian Albums (Ultratop Flanders)	102
Belgian Albums (Ultratop Wallonia)	190
Chilean Albums (Punto Musical)	8
Dutch Albums (Album Top 100)	74
Italian Albums (FIMI)	68
Mexican Albums (AMPROFON)	1
Spanish Albums (Promusicae)	3
South American Albums (Prensario)	2
Swiss Albums (Schweizer Hitparade)	37
US Billboard 200	10
US Top Latin Albums (Billboard)	1
US Tropical Albums (Billboard)	1
Uruguayan Albums (CUD)	16

=== Year-end charts ===
Chart (2017)	Position
Mexican Albums (AMPROFON)	83
US Top Latin Albums (Billboard)	6
Chart (2018)	Position
US Top Latin Albums (Billboard)	4
Chart (2019)	Position
US Top Latin Albums (Billboard)	21
Chart (2020)	Position
US Top Latin Albums (Billboard)	36
Chart (2021)	Position
US Top Latin Albums (Billboard)	40

== Certifications ==
Region	Certification	Certified units/sales
Argentina (CAPIF)	Gold	10,000^{^}
Chile	Gold	
Italy (FIMI)	Gold	25,000^{‡}
Mexico (AMPROFON)	4× Platinum	240,000^{‡}
United States (RIAA)	22× Platinum (Latin)	1,320,000^{‡}
^{^} Shipments figures based on certification alone.^{‡} Sales+streaming figures based on certification alone.
