= Se Preparó =

2017 song by Ozuna

Single by Ozuna

from the album Odisea
- Language: Spanish
- Released: August 11, 2017
- Genre: Reggaeton
- Length: 3:08
- Songwriters: Juan Carlos Ozuna; José Aponte; Carlos Ortiz; Luis Ortiz; Vicente Saavedra; Juan Rivera
- Producers: Bless The Producer; Hi Music Hi Flow; Gaby Music; Chris Jedi

Ozuna singles chronology
"Que Va" (2017)	"Se Preparó" (2017)	"Una Flor" (2017)

Music video
- Se Preparó on YouTube

"Se Preparó" is a song by Puerto Rican singer Ozuna released in 2017.

== Background ==
"Se Preparó" was released on August 11, 2017, as the first prelude to his debut album Odisea. The song was written by Ozuna, José Aponte, Carlos Ortiz, Luis Ortiz, Juan River, Vicente Saavedra, and his producers Bless The Producer, Hi Music Hi Flow, Gabi Music and Chris Jedi, addresses in his lyrics about a relationship in which a girl has a boyfriend who is unfaithful and treats her badly, which promises changes that in the end never come.

In August 2018, a remix version had been announced with the singer Farruko and Maluma, and his producers Julian Turizo, Chris Jedi, Gaby Music, Ray El Ingeniero and Hi Music Hi Flow.

== Music video ==
"Se Preparó" was released on August 11, 2017, on YouTube and was recorded in Caracas, Venezuela and was directed by the Venezuelan producer Nuno Gomes. As of August 2025, the song has received over 1.8 billion views on YouTube.

== Charts ==
=== Weekly charts ===
Chart (2017)	Peak position
Mexico Espanol Airplay (Billboard)	14
Spain (Promusicae)	3
US Hot Latin Songs (Billboard)	16
US Latin Airplay (Billboard)	14
US Latin Pop Airplay (Billboard)	20
US Latin Rhythm Airplay (Billboard)	8

=== Year-end charts ===
Chart (2017)	Position
Spain (PROMUSICAE)	46

Chart (2018)	Position
Dominican Republic Streaming (Monitor Latino)	95
Spain (PROMUSICAE)	79
US Hot Latin Songs (Billboard)	53

== Certifications ==
Region	Certification	Certified units/sales
Italy (FIMI)	Platinum	50,000^{‡}
Spain (Promusicae)	5× Platinum	300,000^{‡}
United States (RIAA)	21× Platinum (Latin)	1,260,000^{‡}
^{‡} Sales+streaming figures based on certification alone.
