= Héroe Favorito =

Single by Romeo Santos

from the album Golden
- Language: Spanish
- English title: "Favorite Hero"
- Released: February 10, 2017
- Genre: Bachata; jazz
- Length: 4:00
- Label: Sony Latin
- Composers: Romeo Santos; Joaquín Díaz
- Lyricist: Romeo Santos
- Producers: Romeo Santos; Iván Chévere

Romeo Santos singles chronology
"Masoquismo" (2015)	"Héroe Favorito" (2017)	"Imitadora" (2017)

Music video
- "Héroe Favorito" on YouTube

"Héroe Favorito" (English: “Favorite Hero”) is a song by American singer Romeo Santos. The song was written by Romeo Santos and Joaquín Díaz, with production handled by Romeo Santos and Matetraxx. It was released to digital retailers on February 10, 2017, through Sony Music Latin, as the lead single released off Santos' third studio album, Golden. The song debuted at number one on Billboard's Latin Airplay chart, as well as reached the top 10 in Dominican Republic, Panama and Spain.

== Background ==
Audio of the song was leaked on the internet ahead of its release. On February 10, 2017, the song was released to iTunes Store and Tidal earlier than expected. It was released to all major digital retailers on February 13, 2017.

In an interview with Billboard magazine, Santos said that the song was about "a girl he's infatuated with and wants to be her superhero to protect her". Santos said: "Her parents are trying to set her up with this other guy. At least from my perspective, she's not too enthusiastic about it, so in my imagination, I'm like, if I were a superhero I would protect her. I have strength like Hulk, climb up 100 feet to her balcony like Spider-Man, a lot of metaphors."

== Composition ==
The song is described by Elias Leight of Billboard as an "audacious combination of jazz and bachata".

== Artwork ==
Santos collaborated with Marvel Custom, Marvel Comics' content and marketing agency, on the single's artwork, in which he was dressed up as a superhero. "I always had this fascination with superheroes," Santos told Billboard. "Who didn't love Hulk and Spider-Man?" The outfit was inspired by the Punisher, also a character from Marvel.

"He wanted a dark, Kevlar, Punisher type of thing, but without the weapons," said Darren Sanchez, project manager and editor of Marvel Custom. "He liked the idea of a cape, but he didn't necessarily want a cape, so we went with a trench coat that had the same kind of billowing look. He didn't want it too bulky; wanted to make sure it was a realistic body type. He said he liked darker colors, but he wanted highlights, either gold or silver." Marvel characters generally have a helmet or mask, but "a dark, wraparound eye-mask" was created for Santos. "When it's a celebrity, you don't want to cover his face. Half of Iron Man, his helmet is off." explained Sanchez.

== Music video ==
The music video was released on February 14, 2017, on YouTube through Vevo. It was directed by Marc Klasfeld and shot in Los Angeles, it featured American actress Génesis Rodríguez, who voices Honey Lemon in Disney's 2014 film Big Hero 6 as well as its follow-up television series. The video shows Santos, as a driver, using his superpowers to chase after his love interest, who is his client and ends with him and the woman kissing, mirroring the iconic upside-down kiss from the 2002 film Spider-Man between the titular character and his love interest Mary Jane Watson. Kelsey Garcia of PopSugar called it a "dramatic video". Similarly, Isabelia Herrera of Remezcla regarded it as "a classic Romeo video".

== Live performances ==
On Februeary 23, 2017, Santos performed "Héroe Favorite" live during the 29th Annual Lo Nuestro Awards ceremony where he was honored with the Excellence Award. On April 13, 2017, Santos performed the song at the American late-night talk show Jimmy Kimmel Live!.

== Credits and personnel ==
Credits adapted from Tidal.

- Romeo Santos – composer, lyricist, producer, arranger
- Joaquín Díaz – composer, pianist, arranger
- Iván Chévere a/k/a Matetraxx – producer, mixing engineer, engineer
- Tom Brick – mastering engineer
- Paul Raini Castelluzzo – acoustic guitarist, guitarist
- Dante Rivera – bassist
- Raúl Bier – bongo player
- Enrique Terrero – conga player
- Alexander Caba – guitarist

== Charts ==
Chart (2017)	Peak position
Colombia (National-Report)	43
Dominican Republic Bachata (Monitor Latino)	1
Dominican Republic General (Monitor Latino)	4
Panama (Monitor Latino)	9
Paraguay (Monitor Latino)	14
Spain (Promusicae)	8
US Billboard Hot 100	77
US Hot Latin Songs (Billboard)	2
US Latin Airplay (Billboard)	1
US Tropical Airplay (Billboard)	1

== Certifications ==
Region	Certification	Certified units/sales
Mexico (AMPROFON)	2× Platinum	120,000^{‡}
Spain (Promusicae)	Gold	30,000^{‡}
United States (RIAA)	5× Platinum (Latin)	300,000^{‡}
^{‡} Sales+streaming figures based on certification alone.

== See also ==
- List of Billboard number-one Latin songs of 2017
