= Megan's Piano =

2021 single by Megan Thee Stallion

Single by Megan Thee Stallion

from the album Something for Thee Hotties
- Released: November 30, 2021
- Recorded: Malibu
- Length: 1:53
- Label: 1501 Certified Entertainment; 300
- Songwriters: Megan Pete; Julian Mason
- Producers: LilJuMadeDaBeat; Megan Thee Stallion

Megan Thee Stallion singles chronology
| "SG" (2021) | "Megan's Piano" (2021) | "It Was a... (Masked Christmas)" (2021) |

Audio video
- "Megan's Piano" on YouTube

"Megan's Piano" is a song by American rapper Megan Thee Stallion, released on October 29, 2021, as track six from her compilation album Something for Thee Hotties. It was written by Megan, alongside frequent producer LilJuMadeDaBeat, with Megan earning her first producer credit for playing and composing the song's piano riff. The song was noted for Megan's vintage, "hard-hitting" bars and the "stabbing" piano riff. It impacted rhythmic and urban radio on November 30, 2021, as the second single from Something for Thee Hotties.

== Background and composition ==
"Megan's Piano" was one of several songs added to the album just hours before its release. Megan Thee Stallion explained that although she is not a professional piano player, she just played the melodies on a piano because she knew the sound she was going for. As she was playing around with the keys, she asked her producer LilJuMadeDaBeat to make a beat out of it; this can be heard in the song's intro as the two go back and forth in trying to combine the piano with the beat. The song features "vintage" Meg bars over what was described as an "uncharacteristically minimal" Lil Ju beat, which contains a "stabbing" piano and a "bouncy" bassline, as Megan references a Nike deal she just closed, among other things.

== Critical reception ==
In their album review, Pitchfork's Dylan Green said "the run of tracks from 'Megan's Piano' to 'Pipe Up' has the buzzy energy of a marathon studio session". Njera Perkins of PopSugar named it among the songs on the album that shows Megan's "hard-hitting bars are back in full force".

== Charts ==
Chart performance for "Megan's Piano"
| Chart (2021–2022) | Peak position |
|---|---|
| US Billboard Hot 100 | 97 |
| US Hot R&B/Hip-Hop Songs (Billboard) | 34 |
| US R&B/Hip-Hop Airplay (Billboard) | 15 |
| US Rhythmic Airplay (Billboard) | 24 |

== Certifications ==
Certifications and sales for "Megan's Piano"
| Region | Certification | Certified units/sales |
|---|---|---|
| United States (RIAA) | Platinum | 1,000,000^{‡} |
^{‡} Sales+streaming figures based on certification alone.

== Release history ==
| Country | Date | Format | Label | Ref. |
|---|---|---|---|---|
| Various | October 29, 2021 | Digital download; streaming | 1501 Certified; 300 | |
| United States | November 30, 2021 | Urban radio; rhythmic radio | 1501 Certified; 300 | |
