= SG (song) =

2021 single by DJ Snake, Ozuna, Megan Thee Stallion and Lisa

Single by DJ Snake, Ozuna, Megan Thee Stallion and Lisa
- Language: Spanish; English
- Released: 22 October 2021
- Recorded: 2021
- Genre: Moombahton; Latin trap
- Length: 3:45
- Label: DJ Snake Music; Interscope
- Songwriters: Donny Flores; J. Lauryn; Jean Pierre Soto; Juan Carlos Ozuna; Lewis Hughes; Lisa; Megan Pete; Nicholas Audino; Omar Walker; Teddy; William Grigahcine
- Producers: DJ Snake; Yampi

DJ Snake singles chronology
"Pondicherry" (2021)	"SG" (2021)	"Disco Maghreb" (2022)

Ozuna singles chronology
"Emojis de Corazones" (2021)	"SG" (2021)	"Señor Juez" (2021)

Megan Thee Stallion singles chronology
"Butter" (remix) (2021)	"SG" (2021)	"Megan's Piano" (2021)

Lisa singles chronology
"Lalisa" (2021)	"SG" (2021)	"Money" (2021)

Music video
- "SG" on YouTube

"SG" (an acronym for "Sexy Girl") is a song by French record producer DJ Snake, Puerto Rican singer Ozuna, American rapper-songwriter Megan Thee Stallion, and Thai rapper and singer Lisa. It was released on 22 October 2021 through DJ Snake Music Productions and Interscope Records. It was written by the artists and Donny Flores, J. Lauryn, Jean Pierre Soto, Lewis Hughes, Nicholas Audino, Omar Walker, and Teddy, and produced by DJ Snake and Yampi.

The song's music video, directed by Colin Tilley, was released on the same day and featured the four artists dancing in a tropical setting. Commercially, the song debuted at number 19 on the Billboard Global 200 and was certified gold in France. In the United States, the song peaked at number 4 on Hot Dance/Electronic Songs, number 11 on Hot Latin Songs, and topped the Latin Airplay chart.

== Background ==
In April 2021, DJ Snake teased a collaboration with Lisa on Twitter, saying that they "have something", followed by a "shush" emoji. On 8 May, in a series of now-deleted tweets he confirmed a song featuring Lisa and noted that it was already done. On 19 May, DJ Snake posted a four-second snippet of "SG" on his Instagram story, in which Lisa sings the lyrics "Play, play all night with you". On 25 June, the producer posted another six-second snippet of the song with Lisa saying DJ Snake's name. On 3 August, he revealed in a now-deleted tweet that they are "shooting the video soon".

On the red carpet of the 2021 MTV Video Music Awards, which took place on 13 September, Ozuna revealed during an interview with MTV News that his next single would feature DJ Snake, Megan Thee Stallion, and Blackpink. On 30 September, Ozuna hinted on Twitter that the song was 97% complete. The first teaser for the song was released on 13 October, which featured Ozuna's vocals and confirmed the name to be "SG". On 14 October, DJ Snake announced the release date of the track to be 22 October, which was also confirmed by YG Entertainment, Lisa's agency.

== Composition ==
"SG" is a moombahton and Latin trap song that runs for three minutes and forty-five seconds. Ozuna opens the track in Spanish, followed by Megan Thee Stallion rapping and Lisa singing in English. Lyrically, the song explores the infatuation with a "sexy girl", expressing a desire of wanting to spend a good time together.

== Commercial performance ==
"SG" debuted at number 19 on the Billboard Global 200 and at number 13 on the Global Excl. U.S. with 19,000 global sales (82% outside of the U.S.) and 45.3 million global streams (92% outside of the U.S.). In the United States, "SG" debuted at number two on Billboard's Bubbling Under Hot 100 and at number 19 on the Digital Song Sales with 3,500 copies sold. "SG" also debuted at number 4 on Hot Dance/Electronic Songs and number 11 on Hot Latin Songs, and topped the Latin Digital Song Sales chart, making Lisa the first K-pop artist to do so. The song debuted at number 37 on the Latin Airplay chart on the ranking dated 19 February 2022 and rose steadily for seven weeks to its peak. In the week ending 2 April, it rose from number three to peak at number one with 8.4 million in audience impressions, up 26%. This marked DJ Snake's third number-one song, Ozuna's 27th number-one song, and both Megan Thee Stallion and Lisa's first number-one song on the chart. "SG" simultaneously peaked at number one on Latin Rhythm Airplay, marking DJ Snake's third, Ozuna's 26th, and both Lisa and Megan Thee Stallion's first number-one song on the chart as well. In Canada, the song debuted at number 86 on the Canadian Hot 100. In South Korea, the song did not enter the Gaon Digital Chart but peaked at number 173 on the component Gaon Download Chart with one day of tracking.

== Music video ==
From left to right, Megan Thee Stallion, Lisa, DJ Snake, and Ozuna dancing together in a tropical setting.

The music video, directed by Colin Tilley, premiered on 22 October 2021 on DJ Snake's YouTube channel. A 30-second teaser was released on 13 October. In the teaser, DJ Snake walks out of a building and gets into a car with a license plate that reads "SXY GRL". Later, the camera moves across three parked cars with license plates featuring the names of Lisa, Megan, and Ozuna. Two behind-the-scenes videos were released on 18 and 21 October, which showed the four artists filming the music video in Miami.

The tropical-themed music video incorporates all the collaborators, both alone and together, against bright summer visuals. DJ Snake and Ozuna appear in between cuts of girls dancing in Carnaval-inspired headdresses and bikinis. Other scenes in the video feature DJ Snake standing at the tip of a yacht, Megan Thee Stallion splashing around in puddles of water, and Lisa performing choreography while clad in a bedazzled top reminiscent of a showgirl's.

The music video garnered 46.1 million views in its first week and topped YouTube's ranking of the most-viewed music videos globally.

== Live performances ==
On 26 January 2024, DJ Snake and Lisa performed "SG" live for the first time together at the Le Gala des Pièces Jaunes charity event organized by the First Lady of France, Brigitte Macron, in Paris.

== Accolades ==
Awards and nominations for "SG"
Year	Organization	Award	Result	Ref.
2022	Joox Thailand Music Awards	International Song of the Year	Nominated	
2023	Premios Lo Nuestro	Crossover Collaboration of the Year	Nominated	

== Credits and personnel ==
Credits adapted from Tidal.

- DJ Snake – producer, composer, lyricist, associated performer, mixer, mastering engineer, programming, studio personnel
- Ozuna – vocalist, composer, lyricist, associated performer
- Megan Thee Stallion – vocalist, composer, lyricist, associated performer
- Lisa – vocalist, composer, lyricist, associated performer
- Yampi - producer
- Donny Flores - composer, lyricist
- J. Lauryn - composer, lyricist
- Jean Pierre Soto - composer, lyricist
- Lewis Hughes - composer, lyricist
- Nicholas Audino - composer, lyricist
- Omar Walker - composer, lyricist
- Teddy - composer, lyricist
- MERCER - mastering engineer, mixer, studio personnel

== Charts ==
=== Weekly charts ===
Weekly chart performance
Chart (2021–2022)	Peak position
Belgium (Ultratop 50 Wallonia)	40
Canada Hot 100 (Billboard)	86
Croatia (HRT)	59
Global 200 (Billboard)	19
France (SNEP)	87
Hungary (Rádiós Top 40)	39
Malaysia (RIM)	17
Netherlands (Single Tip)	10
Netherlands (Dutch Global Top 40)	16
New Zealand Hot Singles (RMNZ)	5
Portugal (AFP)	167
Romania Airplay (Media Forest)	9
Singapore (RIAS)	26
Slovakia Airplay (ČNS IFPI)	71
South Korea Download (Gaon)	173
Suriname (Nationale Top 40)	2
Switzerland (Schweizer Hitparade)	56
UK Singles Downloads (Official Charts)	24
US Bubbling Under Hot 100 (Billboard)	2
US Hot Dance/Electronic Songs (Billboard)	4
US Hot Latin Songs (Billboard)	11
US Latin Airplay (Billboard)	1

=== Year-end charts ===
Year-end chart performance
Chart (2021)	Position
US Hot Dance/Electronic Songs (Billboard)	93

Year-end chart performance
Chart (2022)	Position
US Hot Dance/Electronic Songs (Billboard)	31

== Certifications ==
Certifications
Region	Certification	Certified units/sales
Brazil (Pro-Música Brasil)	Platinum	40,000^{‡}
France (SNEP)	Gold	100,000^{‡}
^{‡} Sales+streaming figures based on certification alone.

== Release history ==
Release history
Region	Date	Format	Label	Ref.
Various	22 October 2021	Digital download; streaming	DJ Snake Music; Interscope	
Italy	5 November 2021	Contemporary hit radio	Universal	

== See also ==
- List of Billboard Hot Latin Songs and Latin Airplay number ones of 2022
- List of K-pop songs on the Billboard charts
