= Dile Que Tú Me Quieres =

2016 single by Ozuna

Single by Ozuna

from the album Odisea
- Language: Spanish
- Released: April 22, 2016
- Genre: Reggaeton
- Length: 3:46
- Label: Sony Latin
- Songwriters: Juan Carlos Ozuna; José Aponte; Omar González; Neison Meza; Vicente Saavedra
- Producers: Bless the Producer; Chris Jedi; Hi Music Hi Flow; Super Yei

Ozuna singles chronology
"Me Ama Me Odia" (2016)	"Dile Que Tú Me Quieres" (2016)	"Tu Foto" (2017)

Music video
- "Dile Que Tú Me Quieres" on YouTube

"Dile Que Tú Me Quieres" (transl. "Tell Them That You Love Me") is a song by Puerto Rican singer Ozuna. It was released on April 22, 2016, through Sony Latin, as the third single from his debut studio album Odisea (2018). A remix version with fellow singer Yandel was released in March 2017.

== Music video ==
An official music video for "Dile Que Tú Me Quieres" was released on September 16, 2016. Filmed on a beach in Venezuela, it was directed by Nuno Gomez and it features appearances by Rosmeri Marval and Luis Mayer. As of February 2026, it has received over 990 million views.

== Charts ==
Chart performance for "Dile Que Tú Me Quieres"
Chart (2016–17)	Peak position
Spain (PROMUSICAE)	33
US Hot Latin Songs (Billboard)	8
US Latin Airplay (Billboard)	11
US Latin Rhythm Airplay (Billboard)	6

== Certifications ==
Certifications for "Dile Que Tú Me Quieres"
Region	Certification	Certified units/sales
Italy (FIMI)	Platinum	100,000^{‡}
Spain (Promusicae)	Platinum	40,000^{‡}
United States (RIAA)	12× Platinum (Latin)	720,000^{‡}
^{‡} Sales+streaming figures based on certification alone.
