= Imitadora =

Single by Romeo Santos

from the album Golden
- Language: Spanish
- English title: "Imitator"
- Released: June 23, 2017
- Genre: Bachata
- Length: 3:55
- Label: Sony Latin
- Composers: Philip (Taj) L. Jackson; Romeo Santos
- Lyricist: Romeo Santos
- Producers: Vinylz; Romeo Santos; Frank Dukes; Allen Ritter

Romeo Santos singles chronology
"Héroe Favorito" (2017)	"Imitadora" (2017)	"Bella y Sensual" (2017)

Music video
- "Imitadora" on YouTube

"Imitadora" (Imitator) is a song by American singer Romeo Santos. The song was written by Philip (Taj) L. Jackson and Santos, and conducted by Carlos Dalmasí, with production handled by Vinylz, Santos, Allen Ritter and Frank Dukes. It was released to digital retailers on June 23, 2017, through Sony Music Latin, as the second single released off Santos' third studio album, Golden.

== Music video ==
The music video was released on July 18, 2017, on YouTube through Vevo. It features Colombian TV host Jessica Cediel. The video shows Santos interrogating a woman (Cediel) because she is not who he thinks she is, and wants her to prove that she is the same person he used to know. The video also shows scenes of Santos and Cediel making love in his bedroom and the bathroom.

== Critical reception ==
Leila Cobo of Billboard wrote: "'Imitadora' is vintage Romeo in its sensual/sexual intricate lyrics, its storytelling and sense of drama wrapped with a great chorus." They regarded the song as "a man's desperate plea to the woman who once loved him and who now has changed beyond recognition." Shirley Gomez of Latin Times called the song "a bachata in Santos' unique style, a fusion of rhythms that makes the singer-songwriter's signature bachata sound." Isabelia Herrera de Remezcla wrote that the song is "a strong comeback for Romeo, a more potent follow-up to the jazzy bachata serenade 'Héroe Favorito'"

== Credits and personnel ==
Credits adapted from Tidal.

- Romeo Santos – composer, lyricist, producer, executive producer, arranger
- Philip (Taj) L. Jackson – composer, background vocalist
- Carlos Dalmasí – conductor
- Allen Ritter – producer, pianist, synthesizer
- Frank Dukes – producer
- Vinylz – producer
- Iván Chévere a/k/a Matetraxx – mixing engineer, engineer
- Tom Brick – mastering engineer
- Alexander "ChiChi" Caba – acoustic guitarist, guitarist
- Adam "Pikachu" Gómez – bassist
- Raúl Bier – Bongo player
- Joaquín Díaz – pianist, synthesizer, arranger
- Mario Hugo – art director

== Charts ==
2017 chart performance for "Imitadora"
Chart (2017)	Peak position
Argentina Airplay (Monitor Latino)	16
Colombia Airplay (National-Report)	59
Costa Rica Airplay (Monitor Latino)	9
Dominican Republic Airplay (Monitor Latino)	7
Dominican Republic Bachata Airplay (Monitor Latino)	2
El Salvador Airplay (Monitor Latino)	12
Mexico Airplay (Billboard)	22
Paraguay Airplay (Monitor Latino)	8
Spain (Promusicae)	73
US Billboard Hot 100	91
US Hot Latin Songs (Billboard)	5
US Latin Airplay (Billboard)	1
US Tropical Airplay (Billboard)	1

2026 chart performance for "Imitadora"
Chart (2026)	Peak position
Colombia Hot 100 (Billboard)	93
Spain (Promusicae)	84

== Certifications ==
Region	Certification	Certified units/sales
Canada (Music Canada)	Platinum	80,000^{‡}
Italy (FIMI)	Gold	50,000^{‡}
Mexico (AMPROFON)	2× Diamond+Gold	630,000^{‡}
Spain (Promusicae)	2× Platinum	120,000^{‡}
United States (RIAA)	63× Platinum (Latin)	3,780,000^{‡}
^{‡} Sales+streaming figures based on certification alone.

== See also ==
- List of Billboard number-one Latin songs of 2017
