= Señor Juez =

2021 single by Ozuna with Anthony Santos

Single by Ozuna with Anthony Santos
- Released: November 4, 2021
- Genre: Bachata
- Length: 4:24
- Label: Aura Music Corp.; Sony Music Latin

Ozuna singles chronology
"SG" (2021)	"Señor Juez" (2021)	"Another day in America" (2021)

Anthony Santos singles chronology
"Hay De Amores Amores" (2021)	"Señor Juez" (2021)	"Mi Talisman" (2022)

Music video
- "Señor Juez" on YouTube

"Señor Juez" (English: "Your Honor") is a song by Puerto Rican rapper Ozuna with Dominican singer Anthony Santos. It was released on November 4, 2021, by Aura Music Corp. and Sony Music Latin. They both performed this song live at the 22nd Annual Latin Grammy Awards on November 18, 2021.

== Charts ==
=== Weekly charts ===
Chart (2021–22)	Peak position
Dominican Republic Bachata (Monitor Latino)	1
Dominican Republic General (Monitor Latino)	1
Mexico Airplay (Billboard)	3
Mexico Mexico Español Airplay (Billboard)	7
Mexico Popular Airplay (Billboard)	6
Spain (Promusicae)	66
US Hot Latin Songs (Billboard)	30
US Latin Airplay (Billboard)	16
US Tropical Airplay (Billboard)	3

=== Year-end charts ===
Chart (2021)	Position
US Tropical Airplay (Billboard)	16
