= Bella y Sensual =

Single by Romeo Santos, Daddy Yankee and Nicky Jam

from the album Golden
- Language: Spanish
- English title: "Beautiful and Sensual"
- Released: October 27, 2017
- Genre: Reggaeton
- Length: 3:24
- Label: Sony Latin
- Composers: Romeo Santos; Nick Caminero; Ramón Rodríguez
- Lyricist: Romeo Santos
- Producers: Romeo Santos; Saga WhiteBlack; Tainy; Nely

Romeo Santos singles chronology
"Imitadora" (2017)	"Bella y Sensual" (2017)	"El Farsante" (2018)

Daddy Yankee singles chronology
"Vuelve" (2017)	"Bella y Sensual" (2017)	"Boom Boom" (2017)

Nicky Jam singles chronology
"Perro Fiel" (2017)	"Bella y Sensual" (2017)	"X" (2018)

Music video
- "Bella y Sensual" on YouTube

"Bella y Sensual" (Beautiful and Sensual) is a song by American singers Romeo Santos and Nicky Jam and Puerto Rican rapper and singer Daddy Yankee. The song was written by Santos, Nick Caminero and Ramón Rodríguez, with production handled by Santos, Saga WhiteBlack, Tainy & Nely. It was released to digital retailers on October 27, 2017, through Sony Music Latin, as the third single released from Santos' third studio album, Golden.

== Background ==
According to Santos, he wanted to record a reggaeton track, to follow his previously released soundtrack, "Noche de Sexo", with Wisin & Yandel.

== Reception ==
Billboard editor Leila Cobo noted that the song "approaches mainstream trap without betraying Santos' voice".

== Music video ==
The music video was filmed in New York City (where the music video for "Eres Mía" was previously shot) between October 23 and 24 and released on November 24, 2017. It features Dominican model Yovanna Ventura, and Dominican dancers Dahiana Elizabeth and Cristal Sicard as the lead females.

== Charts ==
=== Weekly charts ===
Chart (2017–18)	Peak position
Chile (Monitor Latino)	13
Colombia (Monitor Latino)	5
Colombia (National-Report)	6
El Salvador (Monitor Latino)	17
Honduras (Monitor Latino)	14
Mexico (Billboard Mexican Airplay)	12
Nicaragua (Monitor Latino)	16
Paraguay (Monitor Latino)	8
US Billboard Hot 100	95
US Hot Latin Songs (Billboard)	6
US Latin Airplay (Billboard)	9
US Latin Rhythm Airplay (Billboard)	6
US Tropical Airplay (Billboard)	1
Venezuela (National-Report)	33

=== Year-end charts ===
Chart (2017)	Position
Spain (PROMUSICAE)	89
US Hot Latin Songs (Billboard)	55
Chart (2018)	Position
US Hot Latin Songs (Billboard)	47

== Certifications ==
Region	Certification	Certified units/sales
Canada (Music Canada)	Platinum	80,000^{‡}
Italy (FIMI)	Gold	25,000^{‡}
Mexico (AMPROFON)	Diamond+3× Platinum	480,000^{‡}
Spain (Promusicae)	3× Platinum	180,000^{‡}
United States (RIAA)	6× Platinum (Latin)	360,000^{‡}
^{‡} Sales+streaming figures based on certification alone.
