= Tuyo (Romeo Santos song) =

Promotional single by Romeo Santos

from the album Golden
- Released: July 21, 2017 (album release)
- Recorded: 2017
- Genre: Bachata
- Length: 3:28
- Label: Sony Music
- Songwriter: Anthony "Romeo" Santos

"Tuyo" (English: "Yours") is a song by American singer Romeo Santos. It is part of his third studio album Golden (2017).

== Chart performance ==
Chart (2017–2019)	Peak position
US Hot Latin Songs (Billboard)	36
US Latin Airplay (Billboard)	45
US Tropical Airplay (Billboard)	18
