= Nibiru World Tour =

2020 concert tour by Ozuna

- Tour by Ozuna
- Associated album: Nibiru
- Start date: February 14, 2020
- End date: March 7, 2020
- Legs: 1
- No. of shows: 1 in Dominican Republic; 1 in Paraguay; 2 in Chile; 4 in total

Ozuna concert chronology
- Aura World Tour (2018–2019); Nibiru World Tour (2020); Ozutochi World Tour (2022)

Nibiru World Tour was the third concerto tour by Puerto Rican singer Ozuna, to promote his third studio album Nibiru. The tour started in Santo Domingo, Dominican Republic, on 14 February 2020. The tour was expected to have four legs, visiting Latin America, Europe and a 19-date arena tour in the United States ending on September 4, 2020 at Madison Square Garden in New York. However, it was cancelled due the COVID-19 global pandemic.

== Tour Dates ==
List of concerts showing date, city, country, venue, opening acts, attendance and revenue
Date	City	Country	Venue
Leg 1 - Latin America
February 14, 2020	Santo Domingo	Dominican Republic	Estadio Olímpico Félix Sánchez
February 22, 2020 (Note: The february 22, 2020 in Asuncion was part of Verano Velvet 2020.)	Asunción	Paraguay	Jockey Club del Paraguay
February 28, 2020 (Note: The february 28, 2020 was part of Festival de Viña del Mar 2020.)	Viña del Mar	Chile	Anfiteatro de la Quinta Vergara
March 7, 2020	Santiago	Chile	Movistar Arena

== Cancelled Concerts ==
List of cancelled concerts, showing date, city, country, venue, and reason for cancellation
Date	City	Country	Venue	Reason
March 15, 2020	Laredo	United States	Sames Auto Arena	COVID-19 Pandemic
March 21, 2020	Buenos Aires	United States	Movistar Arena	COVID-19 Pandemic
March 22, 2020	Cedar Park	United States	H-E-B Center at Cedar Park	COVID-19 Pandemic
April 2, 2020	Duluth	United States	Infinite Energy Arena	COVID-19 Pandemic
April 3, 2020	Sunrise	United States	BB&T Center	COVID-19 Pandemic
April 4, 2020	Orlando	United States	Amway Center	COVID-19 Pandemic
April 9, 2020	El Paso	United States	Don Haskins Center	COVID-19 Pandemic
April 10, 2020	Kansas City	United States	Sprint Center	COVID-19 Pandemic
April 11, 2020	Oklahoma City	United States	Chesapeake Energy Arena	COVID-19 Pandemic
April 17, 2020	Milwaukee	United States	Fiserv Forum	COVID-19 Pandemic
April 18, 2020	Chicago	United States	Allstate Arena	COVID-19 Pandemic
April 23, 2020	Fresno	United States	Save Mart Center	COVID-19 Pandemic
April 24, 2020	San José	United States	SAP Center	COVID-19 Pandemic
April 25, 2020	Anaheim	United States	Honda Center	COVID-19 Pandemic
May 1, 2020	Inglewood	United States	The Forum	COVID-19 Pandemic
May 8, 2020	San Diego	United States	Pechanga Arena	COVID-19 Pandemic
May 10, 2020	Portland	United States	Veterans Memorial Coliseum	COVID-19 Pandemic
May 15, 2020	Las Vegas	United States	T-Mobile Arena	COVID-19 Pandemic
May 16, 2020	Salt Lake City	United States	Vivint Smart Home Arena	COVID-19 Pandemic
May 22, 2020	Reading	United States	Santander Arena	COVID-19 Pandemic
May 23, 2020	Fairfax	United States	EagleBank Arena	COVID-19 Pandemic
May 24, 2020	Raleigh	United States	PNC Arena	COVID-19 Pandemic
May 30, 2020	Uncasville	United States	Mohegan Sun Arena	COVID-19 Pandemic
June 27, 2020 (Note: The June 27, 2020 concert in Monterrey was part of Machaca Fest 2020.)	Monterrey	Mexico	Parque Fundidora	COVID-19 Pandemic
July 2, 2020	Zurich	Switzerland	Hallenstadion	COVID-19 Pandemic
July 9, 2020	Catania	Italy	Zouk Spazio Eventi	COVID-19 Pandemic
July 10, 2020 (Note: The July 10, 2020 concert in Rome was part of Rock in Rome 2020.)	Roma	Italy	Ippodromo delle Capannelle	COVID-19 Pandemic
July 11, 2020	París	France	AccorHotels Arena	COVID-19 Pandemic
July 17, 2020 (Note: The July 17, 2020 concert was part of Starlite Festival)	Marbella	Spain	Auditorio Stralite	COVID-19 Pandemic
July 18, 2020	Esch-sur-Alzette	Luxembourg	Rockhal	COVID-19 Pandemic
July 19, 2020	Londres	United Kingdom	The O2 Arena	COVID-19 Pandemic
July 24, 2020 (Note: The July 24, 2020 concert was part of Mamacita Festival 2020.)	Milán	Italy	Ippodromo del Galoppo di San Siro	COVID-19 Pandemic
July 30, 2020 (Note: The July 30, 2020 concert in Cadiz was part of Puro Latino Fest 2020)	Cádiz	Spain	Polideportivo Municipal	COVID-19 Pandemic
August 1, 2020	Gran Canaria	Spain	Estadio Municipal de Maspalomas	COVID-19 Pandemic
August 7, 2020 (Note: This concert was part of MEO Sudoeste 2020)	Zambujeira do Mar	Portugal	Herdade da Casa Branca	COVID-19 Pandemic
September 4, 2020	New York	United States	Madison Square Garden	COVID-19 Pandemic
