= Vaina Loca =

Single by Ozuna and Manuel Turizo

from the album Aura
- Language: Spanish
- English title: "Crazy Thing"
- Released: June 28, 2018
- Genre: Reggaeton, Latin pop
- Length: 2:56
- Label: VP; Dimelo VI; Sony Latin
- Producers: Chris Jedi; Gaby Music

Ozuna singles chronology
"Casualidad" (2018)	"Vaina Loca" (2018)	"Me Dijeron" (2018)

Manuel Turizo singles chronology
"Esperándote" (2017)	"Vaina Loca" (2018)	"Culpables" (2018)

Music video
- "Vaina Loca" on YouTube

"Vaina Loca" (transl. "Crazy Thing") is a song by Puerto Rican singer Ozuna and Colombian singer Manuel Turizo. It was released by VP Records on June 28, 2018. It is the second single from Ozuna's second album Aura, released in August 2018.

== Awards and nominations ==
Year	Ceremony	Award	Result
2019	El Premio ASCAP	Winning Songs	Won
2019	Latin American Music Awards	Favorite Urban Song	Won
2019	Latin VideoClip Awards	Best Tropical Video	Won
2019	Premios Tu Música Urbano	International Urban Pop Song	Nominated
2019	Premios Tu Música Urbano	International Collaboration of the Year	Won
2019	Premios Tu Música Urbano	International Video of the Year	Nominated

== Charts ==
=== Weekly charts ===
Chart (2018)	Peak position
Argentina (Argentina Hot 100)	8
Italy (FIMI)	30
Peru (Monitor Latino)	1
Puerto Rico (Monitor Latino)	4
Spain (Promusicae)	1
Switzerland (Schweizer Hitparade)	63
US Billboard Hot 100	94
US Hot Latin Songs (Billboard)	4
US Latin Airplay (Billboard)	1
US Latin Rhythm Airplay (Billboard)	1

=== Year-end charts ===
Chart (2018)	Position
Spain (PROMUSICAE)	7
US Hot Latin Songs (Billboard)	23
Chart (2019)	Position
US Hot Latin Songs (Billboard)	62

== Certifications ==
Region	Certification	Certified units/sales
Italy (FIMI)	2× Platinum	200,000^{‡}
Spain (Promusicae)	6× Platinum	360,000^{‡}
^{‡} Sales+streaming figures based on certification alone.

== See also ==
- List of Billboard number-one Latin songs of 2018
