= Carmín (song) =

2018 song by Romeo Santos

Single by Romeo Santos featuring Juan Luis Guerra

from the album Golden
- Released: June 13, 2018
- Recorded: 2017
- Genre: Bachata
- Label: Sony Latin
- Songwriter(s): Anthony "Romeo" Santos

Romeo Santos singles chronology
"Sobredosis" (2018)	"Carmín" (2018)	"Centavito" (2018)

Juan Luis Guerra singles chronology
"Si no te hubieras ido" (2017)	"Carmín" (2018)	"Loma de Cayenas" (2018)

Music video
- "Carmín" on YouTube

"Carmín" (English: "Carmine") is a song written and performed by American singer Romeo Santos, featuring Dominican songwriter Juan Luis Guerra. It is the fifth single for Santos's third studio album Golden (2017). On July 20, 2017, Santos would lite up the Empire State Building with this song. This would be part of the promotion for Santos's third studio album.

== Music video ==
The music video was released on June 13, 2018. It was shot in a castle outside of New York City.

== Charts ==
Chart (2018)	Peak position
Dominican Republic Bachata (Monitor Latino)	12
