= El Farsante =

2017 song by Ozuna

Single by Ozuna

from the album Odisea
- Released: July 7, 2017
- Recorded: 2017
- Genre: Latin trap; Latin R&B
- Length: 3:54 (original version); 4:18 (remix version)
- Label: VP; Sony Latin
- Songwriters: Joseph Negron; C. Ortíz; L. Ortíz; Ozuna; Saavedra
- Producers: Alex Killer; Gaby Music; Yampi; Kronix Magical; Chris Jedi

Ozuna singles chronology
"Solita" (2017)	"El Farsante" (2017)	"Se Preparó" (2017)

Romeo Santos singles chronology
"Bella y Sensual" (2017)	"El Farsante" (remix) (2018)	"Sobredosis" (2018)

Music video
- "El Farsante" on YouTube

"El Farsante" (Spanish: "The Impostor" or "The Phony") is a song recorded by Puerto Rican singer Ozuna. It was released as a single in July 2017 as the third single from his debut album Odisea. A remixed version alongside American bachata singer Romeo Santos was released on January 30, 2018 while its music video premiered the same day.

== Production ==
The song "El Farsante" is a Latin R&B song. It includes a blend of Latin pop, and trap.

== Background ==
In the song, Ozuna speaks of his want to reconcile and save his relationship with an unnamed partner.

== Music video ==
The remixed music video, featuring Romeo Santos, was released on January 30, 2018. The video was shot in multiple locations of New York City and Caracas. It has gained over two billion views on YouTube as of February 2026.

== Charts ==
=== Weekly charts ===
Chart (2018)	Peak position
Dominican Republic (Monitor Latino)	2
Honduras (Monitor Latino)	12
Peru (Monitor Latino)	5
Spain (PROMUSICAE)	22
Uruguay (Monitor Latino)	10
US Billboard Hot 100	49
US Hot Latin Songs (Billboard)	2
US Latin Airplay (Billboard)	15
US Latin Rhythm Airplay (Billboard)	6

=== Year-end charts ===
Chart (2017)	Position
US Hot Latin Songs (Billboard)	68
Chart (2018)	Position
Spain (PROMUSICAE)	61
US Hot Latin Songs (Billboard)	6

== Certifications ==
Region	Certification	Certified units/sales
Italy (FIMI)	2× Platinum	200,000^{‡}
Spain (Promusicae)	5× Platinum	300,000^{‡}
^{‡} Sales+streaming figures based on certification alone.

== Release history ==
Region	Date	Version	Format	Label
Worldwide	July 3, 2017	Original version	Digital download; streaming	VP; Sony Latin
Worldwide	January 30, 2018	Remix version	Digital download; streaming	VP; Sony Latin
