= Centavito =

Single by Romeo Santos

from the album Golden
- Language: Spanish
- English title: "Little Cent"
- Released: July 21, 2018
- Genre: Bachata
- Length: 4:22
- Label: Sony Latin
- Composer: Romeo Santos
- Lyricist: Romeo Santos

Romeo Santos singles chronology
"Carmín" (2018)	"Centavito" (2018)	"Bellas" (2018)

Music video
- "Centavito" on YouTube

"Centavito" (Little Cent) is a song written and performed by American singer Romeo Santos. It was released as the sixth and final single from Santos's third studio album Golden. The music video was shot in Mexico City and released on July 21, 2018, in celebration of Santos' 37th birthday and the album's 1st anniversary of release. It features Argentine actress Eva De Dominici.

== Charts ==
Chart (2018)	Peak position
Dominican Republic Bachata (Monitor Latino)	1
US Hot Latin Songs (Billboard)	20
US Latin Airplay (Billboard)	1
US Latin Pop Airplay (Billboard)	2
US Tropical Airplay (Billboard)	1

== Certifications ==
Region	Certification	Certified units/sales
Mexico (AMPROFON)	Platinum	60,000^{‡}
^{‡} Sales+streaming figures based on certification alone.
