= La Modelo (Ozuna song) =

Single by Puerto Rican singer Ozuna and American rapper Cardi B

Single by Ozuna featuring Cardi B

from the album Aura
- Language: Spanish; English
- English title: "The Model"
- Released: December 22, 2017
- Genre: Spanish dancehall; reggaeton
- Length: 4:16
- Label: VP
- Songwriters: Juan Carlos Ozuna; Belcalis Almanzar; José Aponte; Carlos Ortiz; Luis Ortiz; Juan Rivera; Vincente Saavedra; Jean Pierre Soto
- Producers: Yampi; Hi Flow; Gaby Music; Chris Jedi

Ozuna singles chronology
"Síguelo Bailando" (2017)	"La Modelo" (2017)	"Solita" (2018)

Cardi B singles chronology
" Motorsport" (2017)	"La Modelo" (2017)	"Bartier Cardi" (2017)

Music video
- "La Modelo" on YouTube

"La Modelo" ("The Model") is a song by Ozuna and Cardi B. It was released by VP Records on December 22, 2017. The track was written by Ozuna, Cardi B, José Aponte, Vincente Saavedra and its producers Yampi, Hi Flow, Gaby Music and Chris Jedi. It is the first single from Ozuna's second album Aura, released in August 2018.

== Background and composition ==
Ozuna told Billboard, in an interview:

I've done a lot of collabs, but most of the time, it's me on someone else's track. I'd never brought someone like Cardi B into my own music. When you hear [the song], you'll say: 'Wow, that woman is amazing,' in English and in Spanish. That to me is the real crossover: a mainstream artist singing in Spanish.

The song comprises a steady, mid-tempo dancehall-infused beat with a "reggaetón soul". Ozuna described the song as "Jamaican dancehall, brought to the club". Cardi B performs verses and choruses in Spanish and a rap bridge in English.

== Critical reception ==
In Pitchfork, Matthew Ismael Ruiz opined how "Cardi's versatility is on full display... The tender [Ozuna]'s smoothed[-]out alto suits Cardi's grittier voice, and they manage to capture the bubbly giddiness of fresh love with a casual swagger. Her bars in English are merely serviceable, but she sounds at home crooning in Spanish alongside Ozuna." He concluded by saying "The song highlights why Cardi is so important to pop this year: Her bilingual, pan-Caribbean aesthetic represents a modern depiction of Latinidad, and proves its mainstream appeal." In 2022, Rolling Stone listed the song at number 100 on its list of the 100 greatest reggaetón songs of all time.

== Music video ==
Directed by Nuno Gomes and filmed in Jamaica, the music video was released on December 19, 2017. The video features a short sequence of street scenes and various people around Jamaica, before panning-out to the shot of a giant mansion overlooking the ocean. Inside the mansion, and on the front steps, Cardi B and a troupe of female dancers perform. Ozuna appears throughout, as well as scene inside the mansion with Cardi (without dancers), and in several scenes in the middle of an intersection in Jamaica. During the rap bridge, both singers and their dancers are filmed at a house party scene, with Cardi rapping on the dancefloor.

On Ozuna's official channel on YouTube, the music video currently has over 3.1 million likes and 565 million views (as of 2024).

== Charts ==
=== Weekly charts ===
Chart (2018)	Peak position
Canada (Canadian Hot 100)	84
Dominican Republic (Monitor Latino)	1
Honduras (Monitor Latino)	9
Panama (Monitor Latino)	5
Spain (PROMUSICAE)	50
US Billboard Hot 100	52
US Hot Latin Songs (Billboard)	3
US Latin Airplay (Billboard)	1
US Latin Rhythm Airplay (Billboard)	1

=== Year-end charts ===
Chart (2018)	Position
Dominican Republic (Monitor Latino)	23
El Salvador (Monitor Latino)	64
Guatemala (Monitor Latino)	53
Honduras (Monitor Latino)	27
Nicaragua (Monitor Latino)	96
Panama (Monitor Latino)	7
US Hot Latin Songs (Billboard)	8
US Latin Airplay (Billboard)	18
US Latin Digital Songs (Billboard)	7
US Latin Pop Airplay Songs (Billboard)	28
US Latin Streaming Songs (Billboard)	8
Chart (2019)	Position
Panama (Monitor Latino)	65

== Certifications ==
Region	Certification	Certified units/sales
Spain (PROMUSICAE)	Platinum	40,000^{‡}
^{‡} Sales+streaming figures based on certification alone.

== Release history ==
Region	Date	Format	Label	Ref.
Worldwide	December 22, 2017	Digital download	VP	

== See also ==
- List of Billboard number-one Latin songs of 2018
