= Ozutochi World Tour =

2022 concert tour by Ozuna

- Tour by Ozuna
- Associated album: Ozutochi
- Start date: June 30, 2022
- End date: July 31, 2022
- Legs: 1
- No. of shows: 13

Ozuna concert chronology
- Nibiru World Tour (2020); Ozutochi World Tour (2022)

Ozutochi World Tour was the fourth concert tour by Latin musician Ozuna, to promote his fifth studio album Ozutochi. The first leg of the tour began in Europe on June 30, 2022, and concluded on July 31 of the same year. The tour was expected to have one additional leg in the United States arenas. However, it was cancelled due to unforeseen circumstances.

== Background ==
Following the release of his third studio album, Nibiru, Ozuna planned to do his third concert tour 2020 Nibiru World Tour. However, it was cancelled due to the COVID-19 pandemic. Following that, he released his fourth album, ENOC, in 2020 and the Anuel AA collab "Los Dioses" a year later. In early 2022, released a duet with Christina Aguilera and the singles Deprimida," “G-Wagon" and "Apretatio. On May 23, 2022, the dates of his world tour were announced through his social media and tickets were available for sale two days later.

== Tour dates ==
Date	City	Country	Venue
Europe
June 30, 2022	Seville	Spain	Estadio La Cartuja
July 1, 2022 (Note: The July 1, 2022, concert in Milan was part of Mamacita Festival 2022)	Milan	Italy	Ippodromo Snai San Siro
July 3, 2022	Zurich	Switzerland	Hallenstadion
July 4, 2022 (Note: The July 4, 2022, in Malaga was part of Festival Starlite Catalana Occidente 2022)	Marbella	Spain	Starlite Festival
July 8, 2022 (Note: The July 8, 2022, concert was part of Latin Gang Festival 2022)	Breda	Netherlands	Breepark Breda
July 11, 2022	Paris	France	Accor Arena
July 14, 2022	Esch-sur-Alzette	Luxembourg	Rockhal Main Hall
July 15, 2022 (Note: The July 15, 2022, concert in Rimini was part of Mamacita Festival)	Rimini	Italy	Rimini Beach Arena
July 16, 2022 (Note: The July 16, 2022, concert in A coruña was part of Moriña Festival)	A Coruña	Spain	Estadio Municipal
July 21, 2022 (Note: The July 21, 2022, concert in Rome was part of Rock in Rome concert)	Rome	Italy	Capannelle Racecourse
July 24, 2022 (Note: The July 24, 2022, and July 31, 2022, concert in Ibiza was co-headlined by Dj Snake)	Ibiza	Spain	Ushuaïa Ibiza
July 26, 2022	Marbella	Spain	Starlite Festival
July 31, 2022	Ibiza	Spain	Ushuaïa Ibiza

== Cancelled concerts ==
List of cancelled concerts, showing date, city, country, venue, and reason for cancellation
Date	City	Country	Venue	Reason
July 22, 2022 (Note: The July 22, 2022, in Valencia was part Diversity València Festival 2022)	Valencia	Spain	Ciudad de las Artes y las Ciencias	Unknown
September 30, 2022	Brooklyn	United States	Barclays Center	Unforeseen Circumstances
October 2, 2022	Reading	United States	Santander Arena	Unforeseen Circumstances
October 6, 2022	Boston	United States	TD Garden	Unforeseen Circumstances
October 9, 2022	Rosemont	United States	Allstate Arena	Unforeseen Circumstances
October 14, 2022	El Paso	United States	Don Haskins Center	Unforeseen Circumstances
October 15, 2022	Midland	United States	La Hacienda Event Center	Unforeseen Circumstances
October 16, 2022	Oklahoma City	United States	Paycom Center	Unforeseen Circumstances
October 20, 2022	Laredo	United States	Sames Arena	Unforeseen Circumstances
October 21, 2022	San Antonio	United States	AT&T Center	Unforeseen Circumstances
October 22, 2022	Houston	United States	Toyota Center	Unforeseen Circumstances
October 23, 2022	Hidalgo	United States	Payne Arena	Unforeseen Circumstances
October 27, 2022	Austin	United States	Moody Center	Unforeseen Circumstances
October 29, 2022	Phoenix	United States	Footprint Arena	Unforeseen Circumstances
October 30, 2022	San Diego	United States	Pechanga Arena	Unforeseen Circumstances
November 5, 2022	Portland	United States	Veterans Memorial Coliseum	Unforeseen Circumstances
November 6, 2022	Seattle	United States	Climate Pledge Arena	Unforeseen Circumstances
November 10, 2022	Ontario	United States	Toyota Arena	Unforeseen Circumstances
November 11, 2022	Las Vegas	United States	MGM Grand Garden	Unforeseen Circumstances
November 12, 2022	San Jose	United States	SAP Center	Unforeseen Circumstances
November 17, 2022	Fresno	United States	Save Mart Center	Unforeseen Circumstances
November 19, 2022	Salt Lake City	United States	Vivint Arena	Unforeseen Circumstances
November 23, 2022	Inglewood	United States	Kia Forum	Unforeseen Circumstances
November 26, 2022	Sacramento	United States	Golden 1 Center	Unforeseen Circumstances
December 9, 2022	Miami	United States	FTX Arena	Unforeseen Circumstances
