= Sobredosis =

2017 song by Romeo Santos

Single by Romeo Santos featuring Ozuna

from the album Golden
- Released: February 14, 2018
- Recorded: 2017
- Genre: Bachata
- Label: Sony Latin
- Songwriter: Anthony "Romeo" Santos

Romeo Santos singles chronology
"El Farsante (Remix)" (2018)	"Sobredosis" (2018)	"Carmín" (2018)

Ozuna singles chronology
"Solita" (2018)	"Sobredosis" (2018)	"Me Niego" (2018)

Music video
- "Sobredosis" on YouTube

"Sobredosis" (Spanish: "Overdose") is a song recorded by American singer Romeo Santos, featuring Puerto Rican singer Ozuna. It is the fourth single from Santos' third studio album Golden. The song won Tropical Song of the year at the 2019 Billboard Latin Music Awards.

== Music video ==
The music video was originally released on February 14, 2018. It features Santos and Ozuna going to therapy while recounting their respective sexual encounters, before coming face-to-face with their former lovers as they depart. In a sudden twist, the female therapist enters Santos' car and he happily drives her elsewhere. However, It was removed from YouTube do to how explicit the video was. It was re-edited and re-released on February 21, 2018.

== Charts ==
=== Weekly charts ===
Chart (2018)	Peak position
Dominican Republic Bachata (Monitor Latino)	1
Dominican Republic General (Monitor Latino)	5
US Hot Latin Songs (Billboard)	13
US Latin Airplay (Billboard)	1
US Tropical Airplay (Billboard)	1

=== Year-end charts ===
Chart (2017)	Position
US Hot Latin Songs (Billboard)	79
Chart (2018)	Position
US Hot Latin Songs (Billboard)	80
US Tropical Airplay (Billboard)	2
US Latin Airplay (Billboard)	12
Chart (2019)	Position
US Tropical Airplay (Billboard)	30

== Certifications ==
Region	Certification	Certified units/sales
Canada (Music Canada)	Gold	40,000^{‡}
Italy (FIMI)	Gold	35,000^{‡}
Mexico (AMPROFON)	Diamond+2× Platinum	420,000^{‡}
Spain (Promusicae)	2× Platinum	120,000^{‡}
^{‡} Sales+streaming figures based on certification alone.
