= Odisea (album) =

2017 studio album by Ozuna

Studio album by Ozuna
- Released: August 25, 2017
- Recorded: 2014–2017
- Genre: Reggaeton; Latin trap
- Label: VP; Dimelo VI; Sony Latin
- Producer: Hi Music Hi Flow; Ray 'El Ingeniero'; Chris Jedi; Alex Killer; Gaby Music; Luis E. Ortiz; Yai Y Toly; Bless the Producer; Super Yei

Ozuna chronology
Odisea (2017)	Aura (2018)

Singles from Odisea
- 1. "Si No Te Quiere" Released: October 4, 2014; 2. "No Quiere Enamorarse" Released: December 16, 2015; 3. "Dile Que Tú Me Quieres" Released: April 22, 2016; 4. "Tu Foto" Released: April 28, 2017; 5. "Bebé" Released: June 21, 2017; 6. "El Farsante" Released: July 7, 2017; 7. "Se Preparó" Released: August 11, 2017; 8. "Síguelo Bailando" Released: November 10, 2017

Odisea is the debut studio album by Puerto Rican reggaeton artist Ozuna. It features collaborations from J Balvin, Anuel AA, Zion & Lennox, Nicky Jam, and De La Ghetto.

It was released on August 25, 2017, through VP Records, Dimelo VI Distribution and Sony Music Latin. The album was supported by eight singles: " Si No Te Quiere”, “No Quiere Enamorarse”, "Dile Que Tú Me Quieres", "Tu Foto", "Bebé", "El Farsante", "Se Preparó", and "Síguelo Bailando". The album debuted at number 22 on the US Billboard 200 and number 1 on the Top Latin Albums chart with first week sales of 18,000.

== Track listing ==
No.	Title	Writer(s)	Length
1.	"Odisea"	José Aponte; Ramón Casillas; Juan Carlos Ozuna; Vicente Saavedra; Jean Soto	03:10
2.	"Tu Foto"	Aponte; Neison Meza; Ozuna; Saavedra; Soto	03:14
3.	"Se Preparó"	Aponte; Carlos Ortíz; Luis Ortíz; Ozuna; Saavedra; Juan Rivera	03:09
4.	"Cumpleaños" (Featuring Nicky Jam)	Javier Marcano; Juan Medina; C. Ortíz; L. Ortíz; Ozuna; Saavedra; J. Rivera; Nick Rivera	03:40
5.	"Dile Que Tú Me Quieres"	Aponte; Omar González; Meza; Ozuna; Saavedra	03:47
6.	"Egoísta" (Featuring Zion & Lennox)	Roberto Martínez; C. Ortíz; L. Ortíz; Felix Ortíz; Gabriel Pizarro; Rivera; Ozuna; Saavedra	04:08
7.	"Una Flor"	Aponte; Antonio Piter; Ozuna; Saavedra; Soto	03:27
8.	"Quiero Repetir" (Featuring J Balvin)	Aponte; Casillas; Diego Caviedes; José Osorio Balvín; Ozuna; Saavedra	03:21
9.	"Noches De Aventura"	Aponte; C. Ortíz; Ozuna; Alejandro Ramírez; Saavedra; Rivera; Soto	03:57
10.	"Pide Lo Que Tú Quieras" (Featuring De La Ghetto)	Aponte; Rafael Castillo; Christian Fuentes; C. Ortíz; L. Ortíz; Ozuna; Saavedra; Rivera	03:57
11.	"Síguelo Bailando"	Ozuna; Aponte; Alex O Arocho Moreno; Max Borghetti; Wilfredo Moreno Jr.; Vicente Saavedra	03:47
12.	"Bebé" (Featuring Anuel AA)	Emanuel Gazmey; Bryan Masis; Ozuna; Saavedra; Soto	03:51
13.	"El Farsante"	Joseph Negron; C. Ortíz; L. Ortíz; Ozuna; Saavedra	03:54
14.	"No Quiere Enamorarse"	González; Jean Hernández; Ozuna; Saavedra; Siggy Vázquez; Victor Vega	03:34
15.	"Carita De Ángel"	Aponte; Meza; Ozuna; Saavedra	03:22
16.	"Si No Te Quiere"	González; Ozuna; Saavedra	03:47
Total length:			57:50

== Charts ==
=== Weekly charts ===
Chart (2017–18)	Peak position
Dutch Albums (Album Top 100)	174
Italian Albums (FIMI)	31
Spanish Albums (PROMUSICAE)	38
US Billboard 200	22
US Top Latin Albums (Billboard)	1
US Latin Rhythm Albums (Billboard)	1

Chart (2025)	Peak position
Portuguese Albums (AFP)	107

=== Year-end charts ===
Chart (2017)	Position
US Top Latin Albums (Billboard)	5
Chart (2018)	Position
US Billboard 200	56
US Top Latin Albums (Billboard)	1
Chart (2019)	Position
US Top Latin Albums (Billboard)	3
Chart (2020)	Position
US Top Latin Albums (Billboard)	7
Chart (2021)	Position
US Top Latin Albums (Billboard)	12

== Certifications ==
Region	Certification	Certified units/sales
Italy (FIMI)	Platinum	50,000^{‡}
Spain (PROMUSICAE)	Gold	20,000^{‡}
United States (RIAA)	28× Platinum (Latin)	1,680,000^{‡}
^{‡} Sales+streaming figures based on certification alone.

== Awards and nominations ==
Year	Award	Category	Result
2018	Billboard Latin Music Awards	Latin Rhythm Album of the Year	Nominated
2018	Billboard Latin Music Awards	Top Latin Album	Nominated
2018	Billboard Music Awards	Top Latin Album	Won
2018	Latin Grammy Awards	Best Urban Music Album	Nominated
2019	Billboard Latin Music Awards	Latin Rhythm Album of the Year	Won
2019	Billboard Latin Music Awards	Top Latin Album	Won
