= Aura (Ozuna album) =

Ozuna album

Studio album by Ozuna
- Released: August 24, 2018
- Genre: Reggaeton
- Length: 68:03
- Languages: Spanish; English
- Labels: VP; Dimelo VI; Sony Latin
- Producers: Alex Killer; Arthur Hanlon; Chris Jedi; DJ Luian; Eliel; Gaby Metalico; Gaby Music; Wally; MikeyTone; Hache; Hi Flow; Huztle; Hyde "El Químico"; Jowny; Kavy Kaly; Los Legendarios; Luis E. Ortiz; Mambo Kingz; Mandy; Saga White Black; Tainy; Toly; Yampi; Yancee; Fly-M; Yazid Rivera; Young Mvrtino

Ozuna chronology
Odisea (2017)	Aura (2018)	Nibiru (2019)

Singles from Aura
- 1. "La Modelo" Released: December 22, 2017; 2. "Única" Released: April 26, 2018; 3. "Vaina Loca" Released: June 28, 2018; 4. "Me Dijeron" Released: August 24, 2018; 5. "Coméntale" Released: September 12, 2018; 6. "Devuélveme" Released: November 1, 2018; 7. "Quiero Más" Released: December 20, 2018

Aura is the second studio album by Puerto Rican reggaeton artist, Ozuna. It was released on August 24, 2018, through VP Records, Dimelo VI Distribution and Sony Music Latin. It features collaborations with J Balvin, Akon, R.K.M & Ken-Y, Nicky Jam, Wisin & Yandel, Cardi B, and Romeo Santos. The album was preceded by three singles.

== Artists ==
Aura is the second studio album by Puerto Rican Ozuna, featuring collaborations with J Balvin, Akon, R.K.M & Ken-Y, Nicky Jam, Wisin & Yandel, Cardi B, and Romeo Santos. It is in reggaeton style.

"Única" is remixed on the album in a version featuring Anuel AA and Wisin & Yandel.

== Release ==
Three singles were released ahead of the album: "La Modelo" on December 22, 2017 and "Única" on April 26, 2018 Vaina Loca was released on June 28, 2018

Aura was released on August 24, 2018, through VP Records, Dimelo VI Distribution and Sony Music Latin. In support of the album, Ozuna went on the 29-day Aura Tour across the United States, which began on September 7 in Atlanta.

== Critical reception and accolades ==
Professional ratings
Review scores
Source	Rating
AllMusic	4.5/5 stars
Rolling Stone	4/5 stars

Writing for Rolling Stone, Elias Leight called Aura "a step beyond the reggaeton and trap that Ozuna is known for" and highlighted several tracks that compare to the "insta-classics" from Odisea, saying "'Besos Mojados,' a collaboration with veterans RKM & Ken-Y on which Ken-Y threatens to out-sing Ozuna, and 'Ibiza,' which appears to get prettier every time it gets played. Trap-heads will be pleased with 'Pasado y Presente,' a magnetic collaboration with Latin trap forefather Anuel AA". In conclusion, Leight stated that "Aura has just one weakness — at 20 songs, it's more drawn out than it needs to be. But with an inventive singer like Ozuna at the helm, even when Aura drags, it never loses its buoyancy for long."

The song was nominated for a Latin American Music Awards of 2019, in Favorite Urban Song category.

== Commercial performance ==
Aura debuted at number seven on the US Billboard 200 with 49,000 album-equivalent units (including 7,000 pure album sales). It is the biggest sales week of 2018 for a Latin album.

== Track listing ==
Aura track listing
No.	Title	Producer(s)	Length
1.	"Aura" (Featuring Arthur Hanlon)	Gaby Music; Gaby Metalico; Fly-M; Arthur Hanlon	3:08
2.	"Me Dijeron"	Chris Jedi; Gaby Music; Fly-M	2:51
3.	"Vaina Loca" (Featuring Manuel Turizo)	Jeday; Luis E. Ortiz	2:57
4.	"Devuélveme"	Jeday; Gaby Music; Hi Flow; Mandy; Yazid Rivera	3:09
5.	"Quiero Más" (Featuring Wisin & Yandel)	Los Legendarios; Hyde "El Químico"	4:05
6.	"Tu Olor"	Jeday; Gaby Music; Young Mvrtino	3:14
7.	"Ibiza" (Featuring Romeo Santos)	Jeday; Alex Killer; Hi Flow	3:21
8.	"Escape"	Jeday; Hache; Gaby Music; Hi Flow; Rivera	3:11
9.	"Pasado Y Presente" (Featuring Anuel AA)	Jeday; Gaby Music; Hache; Kavy Kaly; Hi Flow; Rivera	3:42
10.	"Aunque Me Porté Mal"	Gaby Music; Yancee; Hi Flow	3:22
11.	"Sígueme Los Pasos" (Featuring J Balvin And Natti Natasha)	Jeday; Gaby Music; Hache; Hi Flow; Kaly Kavy; Rivera; Wally	4:07
12.	"Hola"	Huztle; Yampi; Jeday; Gaby Music; Hi Flow	2:49
13.	"Coméntale" (Featuring Akon)	Gaby Music; Toly; Hi Flow	3:35
14.	"Única"	Yampi; Gaby Music; Hi Flow; Yancee	3:39
15.	"Haciéndolo" (Featuring Nicky Jam)	Saga White Black	3:53
16.	"La Modelo" (Featuring Cardi B)	Jeday; Gaby Music; Hi Flow; Yampi	4:16
17.	"Supuestamente" (Featuring Anuel AA)	DJ Luian; Mambo Kingz; Gaby Music; Jowny	3:19
18.	"Monotonía"	Eliel; Hache; Hi Flow; Rivera	2:56
19.	"Única" (Remix) (Featuring Anuel AA And Wisin & Yandel)	Yampi; Hi Flow; Yancee	3:37
20.	"Besos Mojados" (Featuring R.K.M & Ken-Y)	Wally; MikeyTone	3:12
Total length:			68:04

== Charts ==
=== Weekly charts ===
Chart (2018)	Peak position
Belgian Albums (Ultratop Flanders)	128
Belgian Albums (Ultratop Wallonia)	115
Canadian Albums (Billboard)	25
French Albums (SNEP)	83
Dutch Albums (Album Top 100)	39
Italian Albums (FIMI)	9
Spanish Albums (PROMUSICAE)	44
Swiss Albums (Schweizer Hitparade)	10
US Billboard 200	7
US Top Latin Albums (Billboard)	1
US Latin Rhythm Albums (Billboard)	1

=== Year-end charts ===
Chart (2018)	Position
US Billboard 200	181
US Top Latin Albums (Billboard)	2
Chart (2019)	Position
Italian Albums (FIMI)	71
US Billboard 200	189
US Top Latin Albums (Billboard)	2
Chart (2020)	Position
US Top Latin Albums (Billboard)	16
Chart (2021)	Position
US Top Latin Albums (Billboard)	63

== Certifications ==
Region	Certification	Certified units/sales
Italy (FIMI)	Platinum	50,000^{‡}
Spain (Promusicae)	Gold	20,000^{‡}
United States (RIAA)	23× Platinum (Latin)	1,380,000^{‡}
^{‡} Sales+streaming figures based on certification alone.
