= Ozuna =

Puerto Rican singer (born 1992)

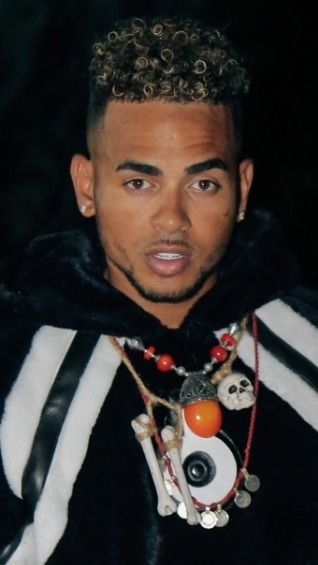
- Ozuna in 2019
- Born: Juan Carlos Ozuna Rosado; March 13, 1992 (age 34); San Juan, Puerto Rico
- Occupations: Singer; songwriter; rapper
- Years active: 2012–present
- Spouse: Taina Marie Meléndez
- Children: 2
- Musical career
- Genres: Reggaeton; Latin trap; Reggae en español; Latin hip hop; Latin pop; Latin R&B
- Labels: Gaby Music; Dímelo Vi; Sony Latin; Aura

Juan Carlos Ozuna Rosado (Spanish pronunciation: [xwaŋ ˈkaɾlos oˈsuna roˈsaðo]; born March 13, 1992), known professionally as Ozuna, is a Puerto Rican singer. Five of his studio albums have topped the Billboard Top Latin Albums chart, with Aura (2018) reaching number seven on the Billboard 200. His musical style is primarily defined as reggaeton and Latin trap, although he has collaborated with several artists from different genres and his music takes influences from a wide variety of genres, including pop, rock, hip hop, R&B, reggae, bachata, dembow, and electronic, amongst others.

Born and raised in San Juan, Puerto Rico, he decided to become a singer at age 12. He was later discovered by Puerto Rican producer Fernando “Damian” Acevedo from Element Music and Damian Music in Santurce La Placita, Puerto Rico, where he made his first recordings. Ozuna has mentioned in interviews that Acevedo also told him to use his last name as his artist name. Drawing influence from the Latin American genres of reggaeton, salsa, and bachata, he made his musical debut in 2012 with the song "Imaginando", which attracted the attention of recording labels and led to collaborations with Daddy Yankee and Anuel AA. He released several singles before signing with Sony Music Latin in 2017, who funded the recording of his debut album Odisea. His second studio album Aura, released on August 24, 2018, debuted at number seven on the US Billboard 200. His 2018 collaboration with DJ Snake, Cardi B, and Selena Gomez on "Taki Taki" was certified quadruple platinum by the RIAA. He released his third studio album, Nibiru on November 29, 2019. His fourth studio album, ENOC, was released in September 2020.

Since the beginning of his career, he has sold around 15 million records, making him one of the best-selling Latin music artists of all time. On 1 February 2019 Ozuna had the most one billion-view videos on YouTube of any artist and he has won two Latin Grammy Awards, five Billboard Music Awards, twelve Billboard Latin Music Awards, four Guinness World Records, among other accolades. In 2019, Time included him on their annual list of the 100 most influential people in the world. He made his acting debut in the film Que León. He appeared in F9, the ninth film in the Fast & Furious franchise.

In 2022, he played the song "Arhbo" for the 2022 FIFA World Cup along with GIMS, which they also performed during the closing ceremony.

== Early life ==
Ozuna was born in San Juan to a Dominican father and a Puerto Rican mother. He grew up listening to traditional Latin genres such as salsa and bachata, which have influenced his musical style. He additionally enjoyed reggaeton artists Daddy Yankee, Don Omar, and Wisin y Yandel, which he refers to as "the real, real reggaeton", as well as fellow American hip hop and R&B artists Jay-Z and Usher. As stated in the eponymous opening track from his album Odisea, he grew up poor and was mainly raised by his paternal grandmother. His father, who worked as a dancer for reggaeton performer Vico C for three years, was fatally shot when Ozuna was three years old, and his mother was not financially stable enough to raise him.

Ozuna was raised in his grandmother's three-bedroom apartment built above a bodega in San Juan. His grandmother instilled a strong Christian faith in him. He explained that her philosophy centered around the ideal "that nothing is given to us, that you have to work for what you get...a pair of sneakers—we bought those with sacrifice. She would say the same of a pencil, an eraser, simple things. We had to sweat in order to get it." Drawing influence from the Latin music he grew up on, he decided to pursue a singing career at age twelve. That same year, his uncle, who served as a father-figure since his father's death, gifted him his first microphone. His uncle often played music by Daddy Yankee, Don Omar and De La Ghetto, and the teenager would rap along with the songs on the microphone.

To further his career, Ozuna took a job at a local bar called El Corozal, where his earliest musical performances took place. Hoping to escape the violence and poverty of his neighborhood, he moved to the Washington Heights neighborhood of Manhattan in New York City in 2010. While there, the artist learned how to produce and promote his own music videos, and made his first video with a budget of under US$100. However, he viewed Washington Heights to be equally violent and impoverished as his hometown, and returned to Puerto Rico with his wife and two children after three years in New York.

== Career ==
=== 2012–2016: Career beginnings and breakthrough ===
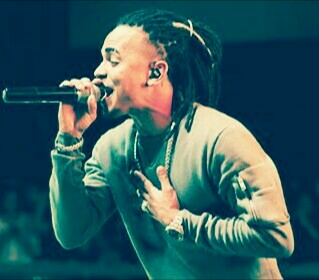
Ozuna performing in 2016

Ozuna debuted as a singer in 2012 with the song "Imaginando". He previously went by the name J Oz. He worked with Musicólogo & Menes before gaining popularity. In 2014, he signed a recording contract with Golden Family Records and began to publish his songs on YouTube. The following year, he focused on gaining a following by performing more than 300 shows in Puerto Rico. That same year, he started his ongoing popular streak with his breakthrough hit "Si Tu Marido No Te Quiere", originally featuring D.OZi when released to streaming platforms and websites, though he was taken down when the song hit radio. The song achieved success on radio and was eventually well known across Latin America. He has since performed in many shows across South America. Manager Vicente Saavedra heard Ozuna's music playing at a basketball game in Puerto Rico, inspiring Saavedra to pursue and eventually sign the artist. Saavedra strategically focused on radio hits to build a following for Ozuna. In early 2016, Ozuna gained further prominence for his appearance in the single "La Ocasión", a collaboration with DJ Luian, Mambo Kingz, De La Ghetto, Arcángel, and Anuel AA. The single reached number 22 on the Billboard Hot Latin Songs chart. In March, Ozuna released a remix of his song "No Quiere Enamorarse", featuring Daddy Yankee. In September, he released his most popular single at the time, "Dile Que Tú Me Quieres", which earned him a place at number 13 on the Billboard Latin chart at the end of the year. Ozuna also had two other songs that made it to the ranking, "Si Tu Marido No Te Quiere (Remix)" featuring Arcángel and Farruko and "En La Intimidad", which reached the top 30. Ozuna regarded the single as his "big break" and credited Farruko and Arcángel with allowing him to gain recognition by including them as featured artists.

=== 2017: Odisea ===
In June 2017, VP Entertainment and Dímelo Vi president, Vicente Saavedra, signed an agreement with Sony Music Latin. The deal included distribution for all artists represented by Saavedra agencies, starting with Ozuna's first studio album, Odisea, released on August 11. The album featured collaborations with J Balvin, Zion & Lennox and Nicky Jam. Leading up to the release of the album, Ozuna had eight singles charting concurrently on the Billboard Hot Latin Songs chart. Odisea spent 46 weeks at the top of the Billboard Latin Albums chart, the second-longest run of all time after Gloria Estefan's Mi Tierra. The Odisea tour began on May 26, 2017, in Atlanta, and included over 25 cities, among them, Chicago, Miami, Houston, and Los Angeles. Eventually, it was renamed the Odisea World Tour, with Ozuna visiting European cities and Latin America. The single "Te Vas" reached more than 710 million views on YouTube, making it Ozuna's most played song on the website at the time.

In 2017, Ozuna released many singles, including "Dile Que Tú Me Quieres (Remix)" featuring Yandel, "Después de las 12" and, in April of that year, "Tu Foto", which reached the 10th spot on the Latin Billboard list, and reached more than 780 million views on YouTube. He also released several collaborations, including "La Rompe Corazones" featuring Daddy Yankee, "Escápate Conmigo" featuring Wisin, "Ahora Dice" with Chris Jedi, J Balvin and Arcángel among others. "Escápate Conmigo" topped the Latin Airplay chart and reached number 76 on the Billboard Hot 100 in October 2017. "Se Preparó" was released on August 10, 2017, and, as of October 2019, has more than 1.2 billion views on YouTube. Odisea spent over 30 weeks at number one on the Billboard Top Latin Albums chart, surpassing the 29-week record held by Luis Miguel's Segundo Romance as the longest-charting number one album by a male artist.

On April 13, 2018, Ozuna featured on a remixed version of "Te Boté" featuring Nicky Jam and Bad Bunny. Elias Leight of Rolling Stone described the remix of "Te Boté" as "one of the most indispensable songs released this year in any genre — a hit in both old-fashioned media like radio as well as the warp-speed world of YouTube". In December 2017, Ozuna released the single "La Modelo" featuring Cardi B. Following the release, the song debuted at number 52 on the Billboard Hot 100 for the chart dated January 6, 2018, becoming Ozuna's first entry to the ranking as a lead act, following his featurings with Wisin's "Escápate Conmigo" and Natti Natasha's "Criminal", while all of them hit number three on the Hot Latin Songs chart.

=== 2018–2020: Aura, Nibiru and ENOC ===
His second studio album Aura, released on August 24, 2018, debuted at number seven on the US Billboard 200. The record features collaborations with Nicky Jam, Anuel AA, Cardi B, Romeo Santos, and Akon. To promote the album, Ozuna embarked on the Aura Tour, which started on July 26, 2018, in Madrid, while the US leg started on September 7 in Atlanta. Upon its release, Aura had the biggest streaming week of any Latin album and reached number seven on the US Billboard 200 chart, remaining on the chart for a total of 41 weeks. He was named YouTube's most-viewed artist globally of 2018, and in October of that year, Time included him on their annual list of the 100 most influential people in the world. He made his acting debut starring in the film Que Leon, which was also released in the US.

In October 2018, he worked with DJ Snake, Cardi B, and Selena Gomez on the song "Taki Taki". The single reached number eleven on the US Billboard Hot 100. The single became the most-streamed song on Spotify in that month and reached over 20 million views on YouTube in the day following the release of the song's accompanying music video on October 9. "China", released in July 2019 with Anuel AA, Daddy Yankee, Karol G and J Balvin, became his fourth number one on the Billboard Hot Latin Songs chart. In September 2019, he received four Guinness World Records awards: the most videos to reach one billion views on YouTube, the most Billboard Latin Music Award nominations for a single artist in a single year, and most Billboard Latin Music Award wins for a single artist in a single year.

Ozuna released his third album Nibiru on November 29, 2019. The album features collaborations from Cultura Profética's Willy Rodríguez, Snoop Dogg, DJ Snake and Diddy. In an interview with National Public Radio, Ozuna explained the significance of the album title by saying, "I chose the name Nibiru from the theory that the world will end [after an interplanetary collision] and I adapted it to my own personal concept: We make music to collide with the world and the public". Also in November 2019, Ozuna performed at the Macy's Thanksgiving Day Parade, which he called "a dream, because I've seen it on TV for years". Nibiru reached the peak position of number 41 on the US Billboard Hot 100 on December 14, 2019, remaining on the chart for eight weeks. It also became his third album in a row to top the Hot Latin Albums chart.

In 2020, Ozuna released the singles "Mamacita, with the Black Eyed Peas, as well as "Caramelo". Both songs topped the US Latin Airplay chart, becoming Ozuna's 19th and 20th chart-toppers, respectively, and putting him in a tie with Daddy Yankee for third most number-ones. "Caramelo" was released as the lead single from his fourth studio album ENOC, which was released on September 4, 2020. In November, he won two Latin Grammy Awards for his collaboration with Rosalía "Yo x Ti, Tu x Mi" in the categories Best Urban Fusion/Performance and Best Urban Song.

=== 2021-2022: Los Dioses and OzuTochi ===
On January 22, 2021, Anuel AA and Ozuna released a collaborative album titled Los Dioses. In January 2021 Ozuna collaborated with the video game Call of Duty: Mobile. Ozuna later released his fifth solo album OzuTochi on October 7, 2022.

== Artistry ==
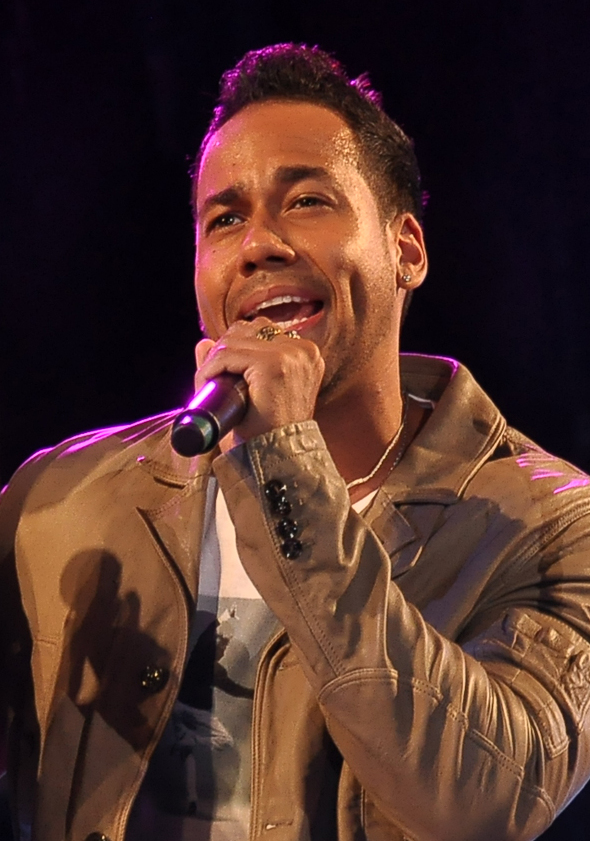
Despite being primarily a reggaeton and trap artist, Ozuna cites bachata singer Romeo Santos (pictured) as his favorite singer.

Ozuna has been described as the "New King of Reggaeton". He is known as "el negrito de los ojos claros" ("the black guy with light eyes"). His logo is a teddy bear in a hoodie, which Lawrence Lowe of Billboard described as having an "approachable sweetness". Eduardo Cepeda of Billboard stated that despite Latin urban music "presently veering away from its Afro-Latino roots" Ozuna is "one of the only, and certainly the most famous, Afro-Latinos to hit the mainstream". Ozuna has more than ten songs exceeding 200 million views on YouTube, echoing the beginnings of other successful Urbano artists, like Farruko and Maluma. Elias Leight of Rolling Stone opined that "If he sang in English, he'd be on the cover of every magazine in America". In a 2017 interview with the New York Times, Ozuna stated that he was practicing his English in the hopes of achieving crossover success.

Despite being primarily a reggaeton and trap artist, Ozuna cites Dominican-Puerto Rican-American bachata singer Romeo Santos as his favorite singer. Ozuna also greatly admires salsa artist Frankie Ruiz. He is also a fan of rock music, and expresses an affinity for the electric guitar. While many of his songs feature explicit sexual lyrics, he has avoided lyrics that explicitly objectify or disrespect women, and Ozuna himself has stated that his music is appropriate for "the whole family". He has compared himself to Canadian artist Drake, explaining that they are both "very careful not to denigrate women or to hurt young people" and that they both often alternate between singing and rapping. His songs often discuss relationships and heartbreak, inspired by the overt sentimentality of the bachata and salsa genres.

== Public image ==
As described by a New York Times article, Ozuna "can work across all these genres at the same time is a testament to the current fluidity of Latin pop, but also to the effectiveness of his singing. He has a sweet, nimble voice that he sometimes deploys like a balladeer, and sometimes like a rapper." Elias Leight of Rolling Stone described Ozuna's voice as "slim but slicing, precise and hard to imitate". Joey Guerra of the Houston Chronicle observed that Ozuna "isn't quite as adventurous as contemporaries J Balvin or Bad Bunny. His songs stick to a more traditional formula...but Ozuna is earnest and sincere in his songs and performance".

== Personal life ==
Ozuna describes himself as a "typical boricua with Dominican blood." He is married to Taina Marie Meléndez and they have two children, Sofía and Jacob Andrés. He is a collector of watches, a hobby that began when his grandmother gave him a Toy Story watch as a child. He calls his watch collection his "greatest investment," and in 2017 alone, he spent over US$800,000.

On October 17, 2022, Ozuna became the owner of the basketball team Osos de Manatí (Manatí Bears), in Puerto Rico's National league (Baloncesto Superior Nacional de Puerto Rico).

On October 30, 2026, the Baloncesto Superior Nacional (BSN) approved the relocation of the Osos de Manatí to Fajardo, where the franchise would compete as the Cariduros de Fajardo beginning with the 2027 season. Ozuna, who had owned the franchise since 2023, was expected to remain its owner following the relocation, although a potential sale of the team remained under consideration.

== Philanthropy ==
In 2017, he started the charity organization Odisea Children. Aside from supporting the hospital with financial donations, Ozuna visited sick children in the San Jorge Hospital, in Santurce, San Juan at Christmas time in 2019, along with other reggaeton artists that he called to action.

== Controversies ==
On January 5, 2017, he was arrested along with his work team at the El Dorado International Airport in Bogotá, Colombia, by immigration agents. The incident occurred after he and his producer acted violently in the presence of the agents, which caused the reprogramming of a concert scheduled in Manizales. On July 30 of the same year, during a concert at United Palace, New York, Ozuna struck a security guard on the head, with his microphone, for being on stage. After receiving criticism for what he did, he expressed regret through Facebook.

In August of the same year, he witnessed Carlos "Tonka" Báez Rosa, a drug trafficker, being murdered. He said he heard the shooting and fled the scene leaving his vehicle, a Range Rover truck, and that the victim was his close friend. He was linked to the investigation of the crime when the police found his truck near the scene. On August 7, the car was seized by police, and he received a death threat from a group of drug traffickers. A few days later, police said there was no direct link between his car and the shooting.

In January 2019, Ozuna confirmed he had been the victim of an extortion scam involving an explicit video filmed of him when he was a minor. The FBI investigated the case, and Ozuna's lawyer confirmed that Kevin Fret, a trap singer, was the person extorting Ozuna. Kevin Fret was murdered, and police said that Ozuna was not a suspect in the murder. For the video, which had been edited to cause Ozuna more damage, Ozuna apologized to his fans and family.

== Discography ==
Solo studio albums

- Odisea (2017)
- Aura (2018)
- Nibiru (2019)
- ENOC (2020)
- OzuTochi (2022)
- Cosmo (2023)

Collaborative studio albums

- Los Dioses (with Anuel AA) (2021)
- Stendhal (with Beéle) (2025)

== Filmography ==
Year	Title	Role	Notes	Reference
2011	NY Sex Chronicles	Himself	Additional role	
2018	Que León	José Miguel León	Main role	
2019	Los Leones	José Miguel León	Main role	
2021	Tom & Jerry	Assistant Hotel Staff	Cameo	
2021	F9	Young Santos	Main Role	
2022	Father of the Bride	Himself	Cameo	

== Awards and nominations ==
Ozuna has received numerous awards, including two Latin Grammy Awards—both for "Yo x ti, tú x mí"—from ten nominations, as well as five Billboard Music Awards, twelve Billboard Latin Music Awards, six Latin American Music Awards, eight Lo Nuestro Awards, and four Guinness World Records.

== Concert tours ==
- Odisea World Tour (2017)
- Aura Tour (2018–2019)
- Nibiru World Tour (2020)
- Ozutochi World Tour (2022)
- Una Aventura World Tour (2026)

== See also ==
- List of Afro-Latinos
- List of best-selling Latin music artists
