= Sin Ti =

Sin Ti (Spanish "Without You") may refer to:

== Songs ==
- "Sin Ti" (Chino & Nacho song), 2012
- "Sin Ti" (Inna song), 2019
- "Sin Ti" (Samo song), 2013
- "Sin Ti" (Yolandita Monge song), 2015
- "Sin Ti", song by Antony Santos, 2003
- "Sin Ti", song by Aleks Syntek y La Gente Normal
- "Sin Ti", song by Badfinger, 1972
- "Sin Ti", song by José José
- "Sin Ti" by La Ley (band), 2014
- "Sin Ti" by David Lee Garza, Luis Miguel and Los Panchos
- "Sin Ti", song by Nelly Furtado and Tommy Torres
- "Sin Ti", song by Sunny & the Sunliners

== Other uses ==
- Sin Ti (album), an album by Antony Santos
- Sin ti (TV series), a 1997 telenovela
