= Que Vuelvas =

Que Vuelvas may refer to:

- "Que Vuelvas" (Anthony Santos song)
- "Que Vuelvas" (Carín León and Grupo Frontera song)
- "Que Vuelvas", a song by Shakira from her album Dónde Están los Ladrones?
