= Se Acabó =

Se Acabó is a Spanish language phrase meaning "it's over". It may refer to:

== Songs ==
- "Se Acabo" by The Beatnuts feat. Magic Juan and Swinger
- "Se acabó" by María Jiménez
- "Se Acabó el Amor" by Abraham Mateo feat. Yandel and Jennifer Lopez
- "Se Acabó El Abuso" by Anthony Santos
- "Se Acabó Aquel Amor" by Selena y Los Dinos

== Organisations ==
- Se Acabó La Fiesta

== See also ==
- SeAcabó, a feminist hashtag using the phrase
