= Tócame =

Tócame may refer to:

- "Tócame" (song), a 2020 song by Anitta
- Tócame (album), a 2015 album by Anthony Santos
