= 25 Grandes Éxitos =

Greatest hits album by Anthony Santos
- Released: November 4, 2014
- Recorded: 1991–2013
- Genre: Bachata; tropical
- Length: 2:04:28
- Label: Independent

Anthony Santos chronology
En Vivo - Sold Out At Madison Square Garden (2014)	25 Grandes Éxitos (2014)	Tócame (2015)

25 Grandes Éxitos (English: 25 Greatest Hits) is a greatest hits album by Bachata singer Anthony Santos. It was released on November 4, 2014.

== Track listing ==
No.	Title	Length
1.	"Voy Pa'lla"	3:41
2.	"Antología De Caricias"	3:53
3.	"Creiste"	4:15
4.	"Consejo De Padre"	5:56
5.	"Olvidarme De Ti"	4:35
6.	"Linda y Difícil"	5:24
7.	"Si Tu Cariño No Está"	4:04
8.	"Te Vas Amor"	3:01
9.	"Corazón Culpable"	5:57
10.	"Por Mi Timidez"	4:39
11.	"Cuantos Días Más"	5:46
12.	"La Jaula De Oro"	5:20
13.	"Florecita Blanca"	5:07
14.	"Cuanto Lamento" (Balada Version)	4:56
15.	"El Baile Del Perrito"	8:08
16.	"Yo Me Muero Por Ti"	6:31
17.	"Durmiendo Solo" (Balada Version)	5:57
18.	"Corazón Bonito"	4:23
19.	"La Parcella"	2:55
20.	"Donde Estará"	4:48
21.	"Ay Mujer"	4:16
22.	"Me Voy Mañana"	5:15
23.	"Por Un Chin De Amor"	4:57
24.	"Pégame Tu Vicio"	6:10
25.	"Vete y Aléjate De Mí"	4:34
Total length:		2:04:28

== Charts ==
Chart (2014)	Peak Position
US Tropical Albums (Billboard)	7
