= Solo Te Amo =

Single by Anthony Santos
- Released: June 16, 2014
- Genre: Bachata
- Length: 4:21
- Label: Independent

Anthony Santos singles chronology
"Tu Estaras" (2014)	"Solo Te Amo" (2014)	"Que Cosas Tiene el Amor" (2015)

"Solo Te Amo" ("I Only Love You") is a song by Dominican musician, Anthony Santos. It was released on June 16, 2014. This song peaked at number 1 not only on the Monitor Latino's Dominican Republic Bachata songs chart. It also peaked number 1 on the Billboard Tropical Airplay chart, making it his first song reach at that number in any Billboard chart.

== Charts ==
Chart (2014)	Peak position
Dominican Republic Bachata (Monitor Latino)	1
Dominican Republic General (Monitor Latino)	2
US Tropical Airplay (Billboard)	1
