= Bellas (song) =

2018 single by Anthony Santos with Romeo Santos

Single by Anthony Santos featuring Romeo Santos

from the album La Historia De Mi Vida: El Final, Vol. 1 and Utopía
- Released: August 1, 2018
- Genre: Bachata
- Length: 4:03
- Label: DASM LLC

Anthony Santos singles chronology
| "Que Vuelvas" (2018) | "Bellas" (2018) | "Don Juan & Cupido" (2019) |

Romeo Santos singles chronology
| "Centavito" (2018) | "Bellas" (2018) | "Ella Quiere Beber (Remix)" (2018) |

"Bellas" (English: "Beautiful") is a 2018 song by Dominican singer Anthony Santos and American singer Romeo Santos. The song was released on August 1, 2018. It served as the second single for Anthony's twenty-third studio album La Historia De Mi Vida: El Final, Vol. 1 (2018). It is also included in Romeo's fourth studio album Utopía (2019).

== Charts ==
| Chart (2018) | Peak position |
|---|---|
| Dominican Republic Bachata (Monitor Latino) | 18 |
