= Masoquismo =

2018 single by Anthony Santos with Romeo Santos

Single by Anthony Santos featuring Romeo Santos
- Released: October 30, 2015
- Genre: Bachata; Merengue
- Length: 4:57
- Label: Mayimbe Music Inc.
- Songwriter: Anthony "Romeo" Santos

Anthony Santos singles chronology
"Necesito De Ti" (2015)	"Masoquismo" (2015)	"Tengo Vicio De Ti" (2016)

Romeo Santos singles chronology
"Yo También" (2015)	"Masoquismo" (2015)	"Héroe Favorito" (2017)

"Masoquismo" (English: "Masochism") is a song by Dominican singer Anthony Santos and featured American singer Romeo Santos. The single was released on October 30, 2015.

== Charts ==
Chart (2015)	Peak position
US Latin Digital Song Sales (Billboard)	6
