= La Batalla =

Studio album by Antony Santos
- Released: 1992
- Recorded: 1992
- Genre: Bachata; tropical
- Length: 1:00:16
- Label: Platano Records & RM Records

Antony Santos chronology
La Chupadera (1991)	La Batalla (1992)	Corazón Bonito (1993)

Singles from La Batalla
- 1. "Yo Me Muero Por Ti" Released: 1992; 2. "Antologia de Caricias" Released: 1992; 3. "Ay Mujer" Released: 1992

La Batalla (English: The Battle) is the second studio album by Dominican singer Antony Santos. It was released in 1992 by Platano Records and RM Records. This album included famous songs like the merengues "El Baile Del Perrito" and "Yo Me Muero Por Ti". Also, bachatas like "Florecita Blanca", Vengo De Alla, and "Antologia De Caricias", which is a cover of a song from Altamira Banda Show, and Ay Mujer, which is a cover of Juan Luis Guerra's song from his 1987 album, Mientras Más Lo Pienso...Tú.

== Track listing ==
All tracks are written by Antony Santos, except where noted.

No.	Title	Writer(s)	Length
1.	"El Baile Del Perrito"		8:13
2.	"Linda y Dificil"		5:27
3.	"Florecita Blanca"		5:14
4.	"Yo Me Muero Por Ti"		6:40
5.	"La Cartera"		3:48
6.	"Me Enamore"		5:39
7.	"Vengo De Alla"		4:42
8.	"El Animal"		6:41
9.	"Antologia De Caricias"	Jankarlos Nuñez	3:58
10.	"El Canal"		5:34
11.	"Ay Mujer"	Juan Luis Guerra	4:20
Total length:			1:00:16

== Charts ==
Chart (1993)	Peak Position
US Tropical Albums (Billboard)	13
