= Antony Santos =

Dominican musician (born 1967)

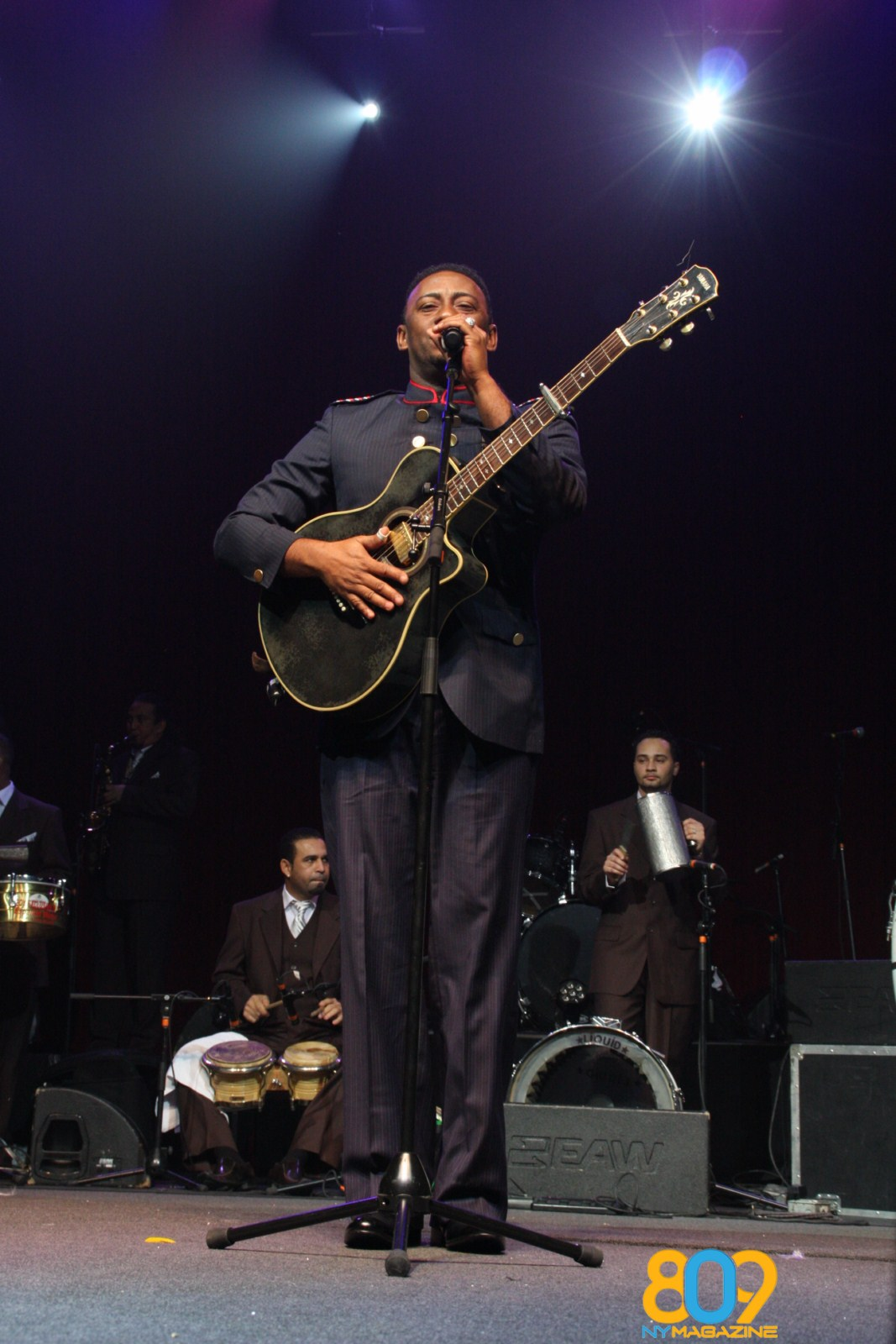
- Santos at the United Palace in 2010

Background information
- Also known as: El Mayimbe; El Bachatú
- Born: Domingo Antonio Santos Muñoz; 5 May 1967 (age 59); Las Matas de Santa Cruz, Dominican Republic
- Genre: Bachata
- Occupations: Musician; singer
- Instruments: Vocals; guitar
- Years active: 1990–present
- Labels: Platano Records, Premium Latin Music, Sony Music Latin

Domingo Antonio Santos Muñoz (born May 5, 1967), known professionally as Antony Santos, is a Dominican musician and singer. One of the top-selling bachata artists of all time, he is known as one of the pioneers of modern bachata in the early 1990s, with his role in redefining the genre to include romantic lyrics, poppy guitar licks, and implementation of new instruments, such as the piano and saxophone. He became the first rural bachatero to reach a mainstream audience with his hit single, "Voy Pa'lla". He has had success with other hits like "Por Mi Timidez", "No Te Puedo Olvidar", "Me Quiero Morir", "Lloro", "Solo Te Amo", "Se Acabó El Abuso", among others. He is known as "El Mayimbe" of Bachata, and is the second Dominican musician to acquire this moniker, after Fernando Villalona. He is also known as El Bachatú, the nickname he originally started with.

== Early life ==
Santos was born in 1967 in Clavellinas, Las Matas de Santa Cruz in Monte Cristi Province. He grew up in an extremely poor family in a little house on farmland. His father worked many meaningless jobs for essentially no pay, and the family would often go without food due to having little to no income.

== Career ==
=== Early career, the rise to fame, and becoming the top Bachata artist in the 1990s (1987–1999) ===
Santos entered onto the bachata scene in the late 1980s, beginning his career as the güira player for fellow bachatero Luis Vargas, only to leave the group and maintain a very public feud with Vargas. Raulín Rodríguez also started his music career with Antony as a güira player. In 1991, Santos would make his debut with the release of his first single titled "Voy Pa'lla". It is also the first single for his first album. The song became a huge hit, thus making him the first rural bachatero to reach a mainstream audience. In the same year, he released his debut album, La Chupadera. It peaked at number 14 on the Billboard Tropical Albums chart. The album also included songs like "La Parcela" and "Te Vas Amor", which is a bachata cover of the song "Tu Cárcel", a song written by Marco Antonio Solís and produced by his cousin Javier Solís, both members of the Mexican group Los Bukis.

In 1992, he released his second studio album titled La Batalla. It peaked at number 13 on the Billboard Tropical Albums chart. It included merengues like "El Baile Del Perrito" and "Yo Me Muero Por Ti", and bachata songs "Florecita Blanca", Vengo De Alla, "Antologia De Caricias", a cover of an Altamira Banda Show song, and "Ay Mujer", which is a cover of Juan Luis Guerra's song. In 1993, he released his third album titled Corazón Bonito. It included hits like "Si Tu Cariño No Está", "Dónde Estará", "Por Mi Timidez", which peaked at number 40 on the Billboard Tropical Airplay chart. He once performed this song live with American bachata singer Romeo Santos in the 2000s. In 2019, Romeo would perform this song live at MetLife Stadium in front of a sold out crowd as an homage to Antony. It is part of Romeo's second live album Utopía Live from MetLife Stadium.

From 1994 to 1998, he released more albums with more successful singles like "Corazón Culpable", "No Te Vayas", "Si Me Olvidaste", "Consejo De Padre", "Durmiendo Solo", "Soñe Con Ella", "Ay! No Te Vayas", "Me Voy Mañana" and "Ya No Me Quieres Querer". Around this time, he would become the second artist to ever win Bachata Artist of the year at the 1996 Cassandra Awards (now Soberano Awards). In 1999, he released his first live album El Mayimbe: En Vivo . Later on that same year, he released his ninth studio album Enamorado. It featured the singles "Si Quieres Volver", Ay Querida, and "Pégame Tu Vicio". It also contained the smash hit "No Te Puedo Olvidar"; the intro of the song was used as a sample for Bad Bunny's 2022 single "Tití Me Preguntó".

=== Continuation of success in the 2000s (2000–2009) ===
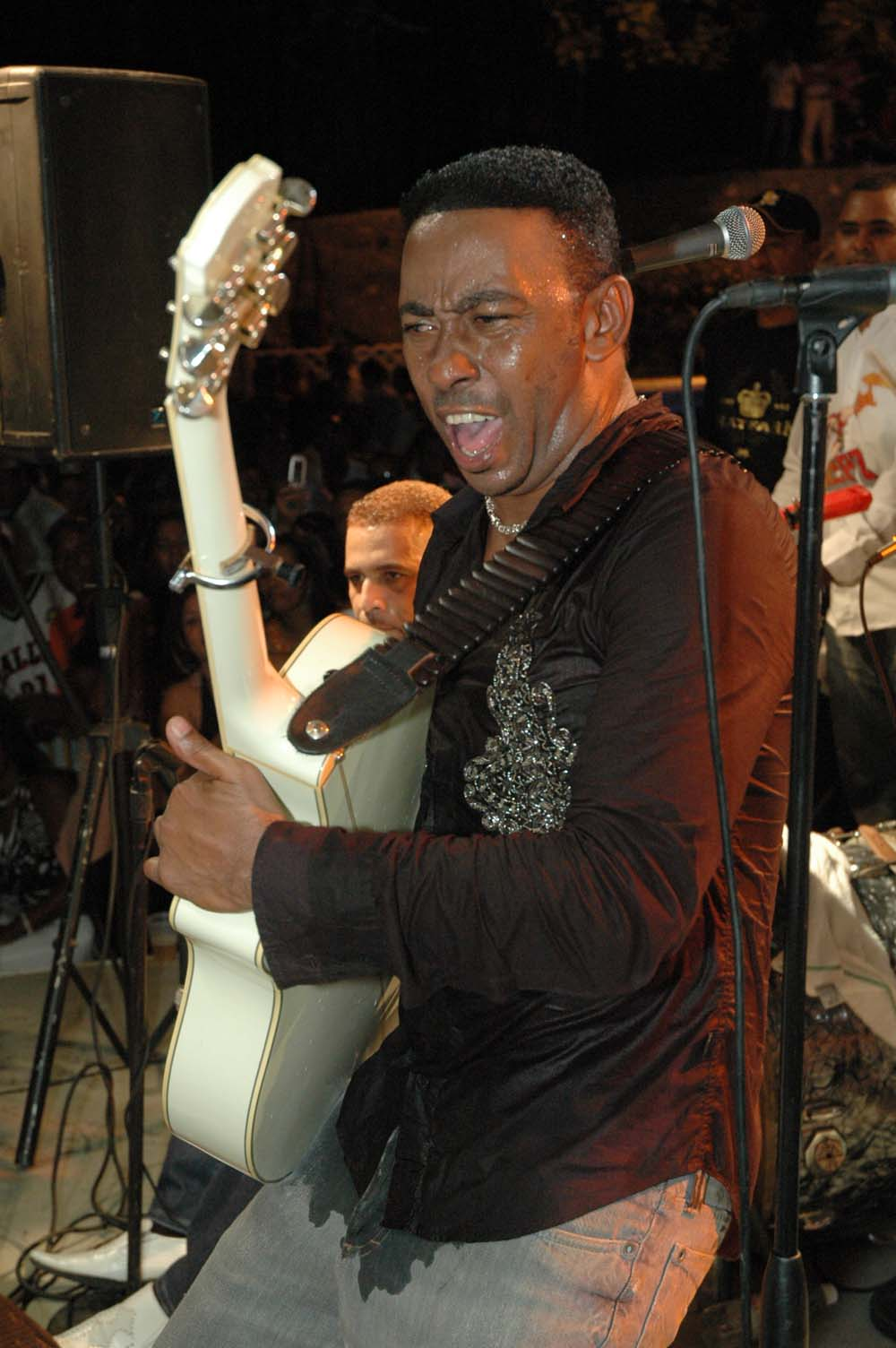
Antony Santos performing live in 2007

In 2001, Santos released his tenth studio album El Balazo. It peaked at number 17 on the Billboard Tropical Albums chart. It featured the single "Si Volvieras", "Cuanto Lamento", "Me Quiero Morir", which peaked at number 36 on the Billboard Tropical Airplay chart. The following year, he released his second live album El Mayimbe, Vol. 2 (En Vivo). In the same year he released his eleventh studio album Juego de Amor. It included singles like, "Juego De Amor", "Brindo Por Tu Cumpleaños", "Dosis De Amor" and "Hay De Mi, Hay De Ti". which peaked at number 22 on the Billboard Tropical Airplay chart and was the first time the voice of his female background singer, Susy was heard on her own in a few lines of the song.

In 2003, he released his twelfth studio album Sin Ti. It peaked at number 20 on the Billboard Tropical Albums chart. It included the singles "Ahora", "La Jaula De Oro", and "Sin Ti", which featured Santos' female background voice singer, Susy. She would also be featured in other songs like the 2004 song, "Ay Amor", which was a part of the 2004 album Vuelve Amor. This album was recorded live in a studio. In the same year, he released the live album Concierto, En Vivo: United Palace. It is based on a sold out concert at the United Palace in New York City.

In 2005 he released the album Lloro. It included the single titled the same name as the album and peaked at number 2 on the Billboard Tropical Airplay chart. In the same year, he collaborated with American bachata group Aventura in the song "Ciego De Amor. It is included in Aventura's 2005 album God's Project. In 2007 they performed the song live at Madison Square Garden. The performance was included in the group's 2007 live album Kings of Bachata: Sold Out at Madison Square Garden. The song is also included in Antony's 2009 album Un Muerto Vivo. The group's lead singer Romeo Santos would make more singles with Antony. Also, around this time period, Antony would start using the letter "H" in his name, thus going under the name Anthony Santos since the mid or late-2000s.

In early 2007, he won Bachata Artist of the year at the 2007 Cassandra Awards. In 2008, he released one of his most famous songs, "Muchos Cambios En El Mundo" (Many Changes in the World), it is a bachata cover of the song Algo Grande Viene a la Tierra by the evangelical pastor Stanislao Marino. It was part of his 2008 album that was named after the song. In 2009 he would win his third Bachata Artist of the year award at the 2009 Cassandra Awards.

=== Collaborations, selling out Madison Square Garden, and number-one hits on Billboard (2010–2017) ===
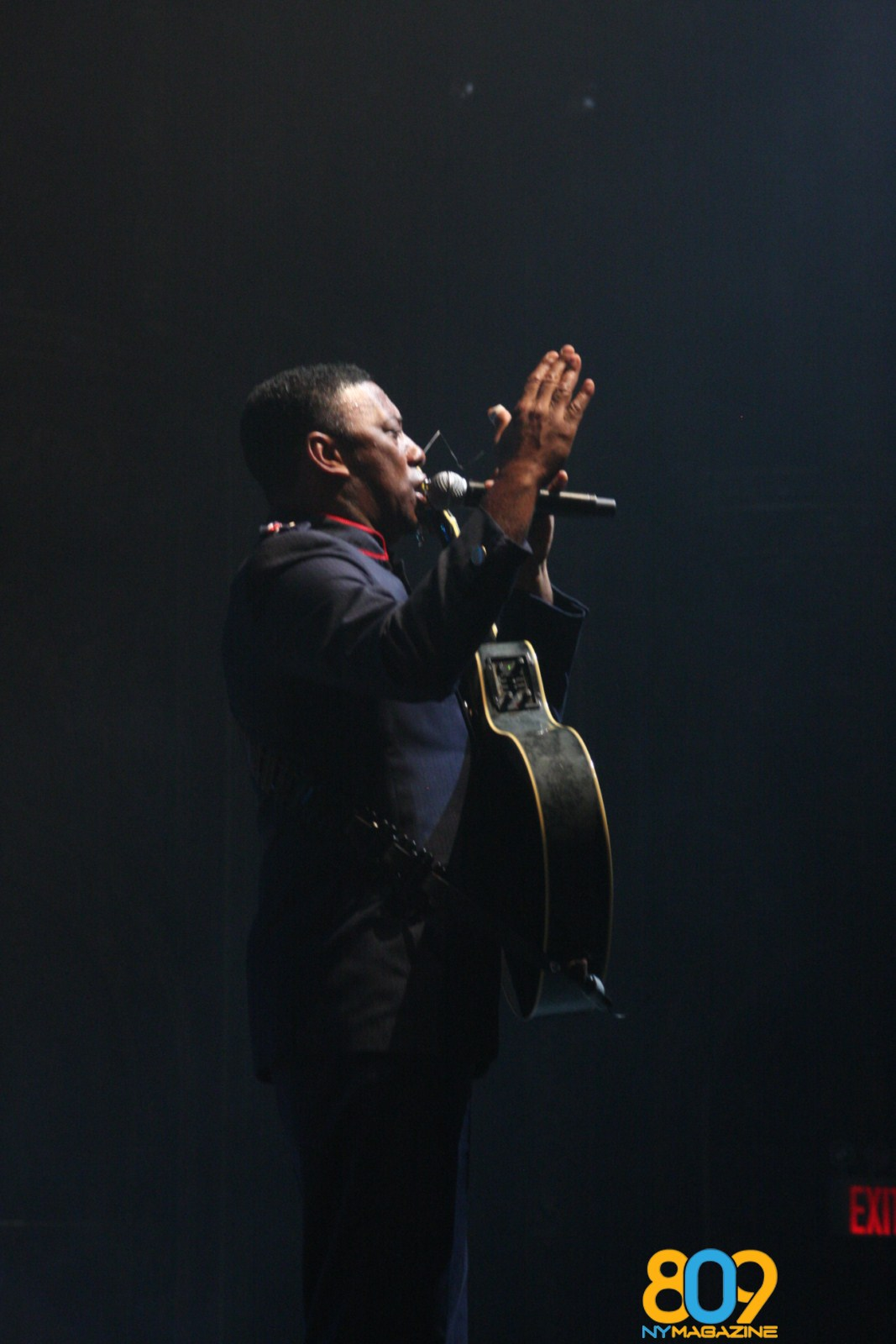
Santos performing at the United Palace on in 2010

In 2010, Santos released Mensaje. It included the hits like "Perdóname" and "La Tristeza De Mi Carta". It also featured his son Yordi Santos, who now goes under the name Yordi Saints, in the song "Ven Amor". In 2011, he released Vuelve. It included the singles like "Pequeño Huracan" and "Golpes En El Corazón". In the same year, he was featured along with Luis Vargas and Raulín Rodríguez in Romeo Santos' song Debate de 4 as part of Romeo's first solo album Formula, Vol. 1. This was considered a historic collaboration for its time as Romeo united 3 musicians who are considered the 3 greatest in the bachata genre. Also, during the first three or four decades, collaborations were very rare at the time. In the 2000s, a few collaborations were made. However, it wasn't until the 2010s when it became more common to do so. Even though at this time Anthony had personal issues with Vargas and Rodríguez, he was willing to join in the song. Romeo explained that when he had the idea to unite the three of them for this song, he wasn't sure if Anthony would want to be part of the song based on the circumstances. To Romeo's surprised, Anthony agreed because he felt like he couldn't say no to Romeo and knew how important it was to make this song.

In 2013, he won his fourth Bachata Artist of the year award at the 2013 Soberano Awards. In that same year, Santos released five singles online. On May 21, he released "Yo Quiero". Then on May 23, he released "Tranquilo" and "Creíste", which won Bachata of the year in 2013 at the same award show as the song had already been on the radio the year prior. The day after, he released "Me Enamoro". On September 13, he released "Bazucaso de Amor", which featured Dominican bachata musician Joe Veras. These singles would be added to Santos' 2014 album. On January 29, 2014, he released the single "Tu Estaras". This was a bachata cover of a Manolo Galván song. Santos made this cover as a tribute to Galván. In the same year, he released his twenty-first studio album Creíste. The album featured collaborations with Joe Veras, Miriam Cruz, and Vakero.

On March 1, 2014, Santos would celebrate 25 years of his career in front of a sold-out crowd at Madison Square Garden in New York City. While a few traditional bachata artists have performed at MSG before, Santos was the first and only traditional bachata artist to have his own concert. While Aventura were the first bachata act in general to have a concert at the venue, they aren't traditional artist of the genre, thus making Anthony the first to do so. The concert featured El Mayor Classico, Alex Matos, Miriam Cruz, Toño Rosario, and Luis Vargas. On July 31, 2014, he released a live album based on the MSG show titled En Vivo - Sold out at Madison Square Garden. On June 16, 2014, he released the single "Solo Te Amo". The song was a huge success as it peaked at number 1 on the Billboard Tropical Airplay chart. This became Santos' first number 1 song on that chart. On November 4, 2014, Santos released the greatest hits album, 25 Grandes Éxitos. It is based on 25 of his greatest hit songs. It peaked at number seven on the Billboard Tropical Albums chart. In the same month, he was featured in the song Miénteme with Tito El Bambino as part of Bambino's sixth studio album Alta Jerarquía. A live version of the song was included in Santos' 2015 album.

On January 20, 2015, he was featured in the single "Noche Bohemia" with Puerto Rican Salsa singer Jerry Rivera. It peaked at number 34 on the Billboard Latin Pop Airplay chart, and at number 1 on the Billboard Tropical Airplay chart. On March 24, 2015, Santos released the first single for his 2015 album titled "Que Cosas Tiene El Amor", which featured American bachata singer Prince Royce. On the Billboard charts, it peaked at number 42 on the Hot Latin Songs chart, at number 31 on the Latin Airplay chart, and at number 1 on the Tropical Airplay chart. On August 11, 2015, he released his twenty-second studio album Tócame. The album featured collaborations with Anyelina (showgirl who works with Santos), Melymel, Secreto "El Famoso Biberon", Mozart La Para, Anthony Ríos, and Prince Royce. The album was released for free as a gift from Santos to his fans. The album is named after the single "Tócame", which featured Dominican rapper Melymel. The album also featured the single "Necesito de Ti". The song reached the Billboard charts as it peaked at number 43 on the Hot Latin Songs chart, at number 38 on the Tropical Airplay chart, and at number 32 on the Latin Airplay chart. On October 30, 2015, he released "Masoquismo" and featured Romeo Santos. This is their third song together and it peaked at number 6 Billboard Latin Digital Song Sales chart. From 2016 to 2017 he would release a few more singles, one of them was the single "El Eco De Tu Adios", which peaked at number 8 on the Billboard Tropical Airplay chart.

=== La Historia De Mi Vida: El Final, Vol. 1, Gran Soberano, and recognition by the mayor of NYC (2018–2019) ===
On June 28, 2018, he released the first single for his 2018 album titled "Que Vuelvas".It peaked at #12 on the Billboard Tropical Airplay chart. On the Monitor Latino's Dominican Republic charts, it peaked at 2 on the General chart, and at number 1 on the Bachata chart. On August 1, 2018, he released the second single titled "Bellas". It featured The Bronx-born bachata singer, Romeo Santos. This is their fourth song together and it peaked at number 18 on the Monitor Latino Dominican Republic Bachata chart. The song would also be featured on Romeo's fourth studio album Utopía (2019). On July 31, 2018, he released his twenty-third studio album La Historia De Mi Vida: El Final, Vol. 1.The album included collaborations with Wason Brazobán, Mozart La Para, Milly Quezada, Zacarías Ferreira, and Romeo Santos. It peaked at number 20 on the Billboard Tropical Albums chart.

In 2019, he won an award for Gran Soberano at the 2019 Soberano Awards. He also won Bachata Artist of the Year for the fifth time and Bachata Song of the year with the song Mal Educado, which is part of his 2018 album. On June 28, 2019, Anthony released "Se Acabó El Abuso". It was not included in the album, but it was released as a continuation or a bonus single of it. The title and cover of the single had the album's title on the song title. It peaked #12 on the Billboard Tropical Airplay chart. It also peaked at number 1 on both the Monitor Latino's Dominican Republic General and Bachata charts. The music video was released on October 18, 2019. It was Santos' first music video in two decades as he rarely ever did music videos. On August 8, 2019, Bill de Blasio, who was still mayor of New York City at the time, award Santos with a recognition award and declared that August 8 as Anthony Santos Day in New York City.

=== The continuation of his career (2020–present) ===
In 2020, he was featured in a medley of songs with Dominican Bachata singer Luis Segura. The medley was part of Segura's collaborative album El Papá De La Bachata, Su Legado - Añoñado 1 (2020). In the same year, Santos released his bachata-merengue single "Me Gusta Esa Vaina". The song is named after one of his catchphrases which translates to I like that thing or I like that. On January 21, 2021, he released the single, "Las Puertas del Cielo" with Dominican Merengue singer Manny Cruz. It peaked at number 10 on the Tropical Airplay charts. The song is featured in Cruz's 2021 album Love Dance Merengue. On October 22, 2021, he released the single "Hay De Amores Amores".

On November 4, 2021, he was featured in the single "Señor Juez" with Dominican-Puerto Rican Reggaetón artist Ozuna. On the Billboard charts, it peaked at number 30 on the Hot Latin Songs chart, at number 16 on the Latin Airplay chart, and at number 3 on both the Mexico Airplay and the Tropical Airplay charts. It also peaked at number one on the Monitor Latino's Dominican Republic Bachata and General charts. On July 15, 2022, he released the live single "Mi Talisman". The audio was first released on YouTube. He then released the audio only version on all music streaming platforms on August 8, 2022. It is a live bachata cover of an Ana Gabriel song. The live single peaked at number one on the Monitor Latino's Dominican Republic Bachata and General charts.

== Artistry ==
Although Blas Durán is credited as the first bachatero to use an electric guitar, and Luis Vargas is credited as the first bachata guitarist to use guitar pedals, Santos was the one who defined the sound of modern bachata. He did this through his use of an Alvarez 5084N guitar, with a humbucker mounted in the sound hole, and an Ibanez PT4 pedal. He is also credited as one of the first to use Yamaha APX series of guitars in bachata. He has also used bachata guitar sounds on merengue and balada songs. Santos' adoption of soft romantic lyrics was more socially accepted than the rowdy style common to bachata before him, and he shortly became the genre's leading artist, helping move bachata into the mainstream.

== Legacy ==
Throughout his career, Santos was dubbed "El Bachatú" and "El Mayimbe of Bachata". "El Mayimbe" is a phrase that comes from the Taíno, the indigenous people of the Dominican Republic, meaning village chief. It eventually came to mean "leader" or "boss". Fernando Villalona was the first one to use the nickname, as he was dubbed "El Mayimbe of Merengue".

Not only is Santos considered one of the greatest bachata artist of all time, but he is also considered to be the most successful musician to ever come from the Dominican Republic. He has served as an inspiration to many bachata artists and musicians, like Bachata Heightz including Romeo Santos, vocalist of American bachata group Aventura, who considers him a father figure in the music industry.

== Personal life ==
Santos is a father of four children; two daughter, Yamelin and Jordalin; and two sons, Anthony Jr. and Jordi (who is currently also a bachata singer and goes under the stage name Yordi Saints). Santos featured Jordi and Jordalin on the back cover of his sixth studio album Sabor Latino (1996).

Santos was once married to Griselda Rodríguez, the mother of his children, and sister of Raulín Rodríguez, making him and Raulín brothers-in-law at the time and the uncle of Santos' children. Santos and Griselda divorced years later. Rodríguez claims that the divorce ended in bad terms and that Santos had caused a lot of emotional and sentimental damage in the family. Since the divorce, both Rodríguez and Santos have not been on good terms. Even though they have collaborated together back in 2011 and performed together at Romeo Santos's 2012 concert at the Félix Sánchez Olympic Stadium, they still maintain a public feud. In an interview on New York Latin radio station La Mega 97.9 in 2015, Rodríguez claimed that Santos had hurt his sister badly and that he owes his sister and mother an apology. His mother had died in 2018. He also claimed that Santos had disrespected him during a concert at the stadium in Santo Domingo, Dominican Republic. They both saw each other backstage and Santos had allegedly asked him that why was he at the event and Santos also said to him that those type of event wasn't for musicians like him. Santos has denied all of Rodríguez's accusations.

== Discography ==
=== Studio albums ===
- La Chupadera (1991)
- La Batalla (1992)
- Corazón Bonito (1993)
- Cojelo Ahí (1994)
- El Mayimbe... y Nada Más (1995)
- Sabor Latino (1996)
- Como Te Voy a Dejar (1997)
- Me Muero de Amor (1998)
- Enamorado (1999)
- El Balazo (2001)
- Juego de Amor (2002)
- Sin Ti (2003)
- Vuelve Amor (Grabado En Vivo) (2004)
- Lloro (2005)
- Ay! Ven (2006)
- No Nos Vamos A Olvidar (2007)
  Vete (2008) [re-released]
- Muchos Cambios En El Mundo (2008)
- Un Muerto Vivo (2009)
- Mensaje (2010)
- Vuelve (2011)
  Me Gustas Tu (2021) [re-released]
- Creíste (2014)
- Tócame (2015)
- La Historia De Mi Vida: El Final, Vol. 1 (2018)
- A Fuerza de Dolor (2025)

=== Live albums ===
- El Mayimbe: En Vivo (1999)
- El Mayimbe, En Vivo: Vol. 2 (2002)
- En Vivo, Vol. 3: Con Su Nuevo Estilo (2003)
- Concierto, En Vivo: United Palace (2005)
- Me Van A Matar Por Las Mujeres (2006)
- En Vivo – Sold out at Madison Square Garden (2014)
- Merengue En Vivo De Fiesta (2020)
- Merengues Pesao (En Vivo) Vol. 1 (2021)
- La Maya Prendia (2021)
- Música Pesá (En Vivo) (2021)
- Merengue Clásico (En Vivo) (2021)
- Anthony Santos En Concierto (2023)
- Clásicos Del Mayimbe (Bachaton 98) (En Vivo) (2024)
  Voy Pa' lla (Limited Edition) (2024) (renamed or also known by that title.)
- Bachatas Clásicas (Live Edition) (with Raulín Rodríguez) (2024)
- En Vivo Se Goza Más (En Vivo) (2024)

=== Compilation albums ===
- Grandes Éxitos (2000)
- Greatest Hits (2001)
- Todo Éxitos (2002)
- Lo Nuevo y Lo Mejor (2005)
- Siempre Romantico (2006)
- El Diablo Soy Yo (2011)
- 25 Grandes Éxitos (2014)
- Hoy Se Bebe (2020)
- Solo Por Ella (Radio Edit) (2021)
- Merengues Pesao Vol. 1 (2021)
- Bachata Hits (2021)
- La Ladrona (2022)
- Los Mejores Merengues Clásicos de Cuerdas Del Bachatu (2024)
- Las Bachatas de Moda (2024)

=== Collaboration albums ===
- Frente A Frente: Dos Estrellas En Uno (with Jorge Ferreira) (2000)
- Frente A Frente: Dos Estrellas En Uno (with Raulín Rodríguez) (2000)
- Mano A Mano (with Luis Vargas) (2002)

== Films ==
- Concierto, En Vivo: United Palace (2004)

== See also ==
- List of Afro-Latinos
