= La Historia De Mi Vida: El Final, Vol. 1 =

La Historia De Mi Vida: El Final, Vol 1

Studio album by Anthony Santos
- Released: July 31, 2018
- Recorded: 2017–2018
- Genre: Bachata; tropical
- Length: 77:12
- Label: DASM LLC

Anthony Santos chronology
Tócame (2015)	La Historia De Mi Vida: El Final, Vol 1 (2018)	Merengue En Vivo De Fiesta (2020)

Singles from La Historia De Mi Vida: El Final, Vol 1
- 1. "Que Vuelvas" Released: June 28, 2018; 2. "Bellas" Released: August 1, 2018

La Historia De Mi Vida: El Final, Vol 1 (English: The Story Of My Life: The Finale, Vol. 1) is the twenty-third studio album by Dominican singer Anthony Santos. It was released on July 31, 2018, under his own label, DASM LLC. The album included Wason Brazobán, Mozart La Para, Milly Quezada. It also included Bachata artists Zacarías Ferreira, and Romeo Santos.

== Singles ==
The first single, "Que Vuelvas", was released on June 28, 2018. It peaked at #12 on the Billboard Tropical Airplay chart.

The second single, "Bellas", was released on August 1, 2018. It featured The Bronx-born bachata singer, Romeo Santos. This was one of many songs they have done together. The song would also be featured on Romeo's fourth studio album Utopía (2019).

On June 28, 2019, Anthony released "Se Acabó El Abuso". It was not included in the album, but it was released as a continuation or a bonus single of it. The title and cover of the single had the album's title on the song title. It peaked #12 on the Billboard Tropical Airplay chart.

== Track listing ==
No.	Title	Length
1.	"La Historia de Mi Vida"	4:00
2.	"Mal Educado"	3:46
3.	"Que Vuelvas"	4:48
4.	"Bellas" (featuring Romeo Santos)	4:03
5.	"Por Que Me Hacen Esto"	3:57
6.	"Extinción De Amor" (featuring Zacarías Ferreira)	4:05
7.	"Quien"	4:24
8.	"Mi Pasado De Ti" (featuring Milly Quezada)	4:26
9.	"Es Una Loba"	3:23
10.	"Hoy Voy A Tomar"	4:16
11.	"Si Tu Quieres Yo Quiero" (featuring Mozart La Para)	3:35
12.	"Sin Ti"	4:20
13.	"Que Hay En Tu Mirada"	5:01
14.	"Tu Amor En Cero"	3:08
15.	"Tengo"	3:56
16.	"Amor Del Alba" (featuring Wason Brazobán)	4:27
17.	"Amor Maldito"	4:02
18.	"Vencer El Miedo"	4:18
19.	"Distinta"	4:21
Total length:		1:17:12

Extra Single (not included in the album)
No.	Title	Length
1.	"Se Acabó El Abuso"	4:08

== Charts ==
Chart (2018)	Peak Position
US Tropical Albums (Billboard)	20
