= Necesito de Ti (Anthony Santos song) =

Single by Anthony Santos

from the album Tócame
- Released: September 27, 2015
- Genre: Bachata
- Length: 4:04
- Label: Independent

Anthony Santos singles chronology
"Tócame" (2015)	"Necesito de Ti" (2015)	"Masoquismo" (2015)

"Necesito de ti" ("I Need You") is a song by Dominican musician, Anthony Santos. It was originally released on August 11, 2015, as the third track for his twenty-second studio album,Tócame. It was later released as the third single for the album on September 27, 2015.

== Charts ==
Chart (2015)	Peak position
Dominican Republic Bachata (Monitor Latino)	1
Dominican Republic General (Monitor Latino)	1
US Hot Latin Songs (Billboard)	43
US Latin Airplay (Billboard)	32
US Tropical Airplay (Billboard)	38
