= El Balazo =

Studio album by Antony Santos
- Released: August 7, 2001
- Recorded: 2000–2001
- Genre: Bachata; tropical
- Length: 59:08
- Label: Platano Records; RM Records; Big Moon Record; Universal Music Latino

Antony Santos chronology
Enamorado (1999)	El Balazo (2001)	El Mayimbe, Vol. 2 (En Vivo) (2002)

Singles from El Balazo
- 1. "Cuanto Lamento" Released: 2001; 2. "Me Quiero Morir" Released: 2001; 3. "Algre Conga" Released: 2001; 4. "Si Volvieras" Released: 2001

Professional ratings
Review scores
Source	Rating
Allmusic	3/5 stars

El Balazo (English: The Bullet Shot) is the tenth studio album by Dominican singer Antony Santos.

== Track listing ==
All tracks are written by Antony Santos, except where noted.

No.	Title	Writer(s)	Length
1.	"Cuanto Lamento" (Bachata Version)		5:46
2.	"Me Quiero Morir"		6:31
3.	"Alegre Conga"	Miguel Matamoros	5:15
4.	"Dame Mas"		6:44
5.	"Se Metio Chiquito"		6:38
6.	"Eres Linda"		5:42
7.	"El Balazo"		6:16
8.	"Si Volvieras"		6:23
9.	"Castígala"		5:57
10.	"Cuanto Lamento" (Balada Version)		4:56
Total length:			59:08

Cover

- Alegre Conga is a cover of a song originally from Trio Matamoros.

== Charts ==
Chart (2001)	Peak Position
US Tropical Albums (Billboard)	17
