= Tócame (album) =

Studio album by Anthony Santos
- Released: August 11, 2015
- Recorded: 2014–2015
- Genre: Bachata; tropical
- Length: 47:47
- Label: Independent

Anthony Santos chronology
25 Grandes Éxitos (2014)	Tócame (2015)	La Historia De Mi Vida: El Final, Vol. 1 (2018)

Singles from Tócame
- 1. "Que Cosas Tiene el Amor" Released: March 24, 2015; 2. "Tócame" Released: August 27, 2015; 3. "Necesito de Ti" Released: September 27, 2015

Tócame (English: Touch Me) is the twenty-second studio album by Dominican singer Anthony Santos. It was released on August 11, 2015, completely free as a gift to his fans. The album features collaborations with Melymel, Secreto "El Biberon", Mozart La Para, Anthony Ríos, and Prince Royce. It also features the voice of Anyelina, who works as a showgirl and back-up vocalist for Santos.

== Tracklist ==
No.	Title	Length
1.	"Maldito Cupido" (with Secreto "El Biberon")	5:42
2.	"Tócame" (featuring Melymel)	4:22
3.	"Necesito de Ti"	4:04
4.	"No Me Digas Que No"	3:11
5.	"Que Cosas Tiene el Amor" (featuring Prince Royce)	4:19
6.	"Dejame Si Puedes"	5:35
7.	"Canción del Adiós" (with Anthony Ríos)	4:17
8.	"Miénteme (En Vivo)"	5:28
9.	"Enamorado" (featuring Anyelina)	3:57
10.	"Pa' Gozar" (Merengue Remix) (with Mozart La Para)	6:52
Total length:		47:47
