= La Chupadera =

Studio album by Antony Santos
- Released: 1991
- Recorded: 1990–1991
- Genre: Bachata; tropical
- Length: 47:13
- Label: Platano Records

Antony Santos chronology
La Chupadera (1991)	La Batalla (1992)

Singles from La Chupadera
- 1. "Voy Pa'lla" Released: 1991; 2. "Te Vas Amor" Released: 1991; 3. "La Parcela" Released: 1991; 4. "La Passola" Released: 1991; 5. "Ya Encontre Mi Hembra" Released: 1991; 6. "El Bohuco" Released: 1991

La Chupadera is the debut album by Dominican singer Antony Santos. It was first released on cassette in 1991 by Platano Records. The following year, it was released on CD. The original cover of the album is the photo that's on top of the yellow background. The CD and Vinyl versions have the background while the cassette version only has the picture of Santos with his name on it. The album was re-released with an alternative cover in 1998.

== Singles ==
The album's main single, "Voy Pa'lla," became a huge success, and it was the song that started Santos's legendary career as an artist. It is one of the most successful songs of the bachata genre. He became the first rural bachatero to reach a mainstream audience with this single. It is one of his signature singles. The album also includes a bachata cover of the song "Tu Cárcel", a song by Mexican group Los Bukis from their 1987 album Me Volvi a Acordar de Ti. The lead singer of the band, Marco Antonio Solís, was one of Santos's inspirations. The cover is titled,"Te Vas Amor". Other singles include the songs "La Parcela", and "La Passola", which also gained success on radio waves in Dominican Republic. The songs "Ya Encontre Mi Hembra" and "El Bohuco" were also released as singles.

== Track listing ==
No.	Title	Length
1.	"El Comedor"	4:08
2.	"La Parcela"	3:00
3.	"Voy Pa'lla"	3:41
4.	"Homenaje A Carlito"	4:13
5.	"La Passola"	4:00
6.	"Esa Morena"	4:04
7.	"La Chupadera"	3:55
8.	"Ya Encontre Mi Hembra"	3:44
9.	"Te Vas Amor"	3:06
10.	"Esto Es Amor"	3:48
11.	"El Bohuco"	3:54
12.	"Un Beso De Su Boquita"	5:35
Total length:		47:13

== Charts ==
Chart (1992)	Peak Position
US Tropical Albums (Billboard)	14

- The album was charted as an eponymous album
