= A Fuerza de Dolor =

Studio album by Anthony Santos
- Released: July 4, 2025
- Recorded: 2024–2025
- Studio: July 4, 2025
- Genres: Bachata; tropical
- Length: 55:52
- Labels: Inagras Global, LLC.; La Oreja Media Group, Inc.

Anthony Santos chronology
En Vivo Se Goza Más (2024)	A Fuerza de Dolor (2025)

Singles from A Fuerza de Dolor
- 1. "Hay Amores De Más" Released: July 3, 2025; 2. "This Loving" Released: September 22, 2025

A Fuerza de Dolor (English: Through Pain) is the twenty-fourth studio album by Dominican singer Anthony Santos. It was released on July 4, 2025, under the labels Inagras Global, LLC., and La Oreja Media Group, Inc. The album features collaborations with JJ Gerow and Akon.

== Track listing ==
No.	Title	Length
1.	"A Fuerza de Dolor"	4:41
2.	"Desnuda"	3:42
3.	"Me Tienes Loco"	3:29
4.	"Quién Te Dijo"	4:20
5.	"Para Que No Me Olvides"	3:57
6.	"Hay Amores De Más" (with Akon)	3:52
7.	"Ya Te Olvidé"	4:02
8.	"Corazón de Cristal"	3:44
9.	"This Loving" (with JJ Gerow)	3:58
10.	"Corazón Olvida"	3:48
11.	"Adios Mi Amor... Bye!"	4:00
12.	"Mil Razones"	4:27
13.	"Por Ti"	4:05
14.	"La Puñalá"	3:41
Total length:		55:52
