= Se Acabó El Abuso =

2019 single by Anthony Santos

Single by Anthony Santos
- Released: June 28, 2019
- Genre: Bachata
- Length: 4:08
- Label: DASM LLC

Anthony Santos singles chronology
"Don Juan & Cupido" (2019)	"Se Acabó El Abuso" (2019)	"Contigo No Se Me Para" (2019)

Music video
- "Se Acabó El Abuso" on YouTube

"Se Acabó El Abuso" (English: "The Abuse Is Over") is a song by Dominican singer Anthony Santos. The song was released on June 28, 2019. It served as either a continuation or a bonus single for Santos' twenty-fourth studio album La Historia De Mi Vida: El Final, Vol. 1 (2018). The song is titled as "Se Acabó El Abuso: La Historia De Mi Vida: El Final, Vol. 1" which indicates its relation to the album even though he never released an extended version nor added the song to the tracklist of the album. The music video was released on October 18, 2019. A live version was released On June 29, 2020.

== Charts ==
Chart (2019)	Peak position
Dominican Republic Bachata (Monitor Latino)	1
Dominican Republic General (Monitor Latino)	1
US Tropical Airplay (Billboard)	12
