= Sin Ti (album) =

Studio album by Antony Santos
- Released: November 11, 2003
- Recorded: 2003
- Genre: Bachata; Tropical
- Length: 1:00:40
- Label: Platano Records; Big Moon Record; Universal Music Latino

Antony Santos chronology
En Vivo, Vol. 3: Con Su Nuevo Estilo (2003)	Sin Ti (2003)	Vuelve (2004)

Singles from Sin Ti
- 1. "Sin Ti" Released: 2003; 2. "La Jaula De Oro" Released: 2003; 3. "Ahora" Released: 2003

Sin Ti (English: Without You) is the twelfth studio album by Dominican singer Antony Santos.

== Track listing ==
No.	Title	Length
1.	"Sin Ti" (featuring Susy)	5:22
2.	"La Camarera"	5:59
3.	"La Jaula De Oro"	5:19
4.	"Las Varias"	7:19
5.	"Ahora"	4:21
6.	"Otra Vez"	5:40
7.	"Se Acabará Mi Suerte"	5:19
8.	"Tu Gato Triste"	5:23
9.	"No Es Bueno"	4:07
10.	"Yolanda"	6:54
11.	"Damelo To'"	4:57
Total length:		1:00:40

== Charts ==
Chart (2003)	Peak Position
US Tropical Albums (Billboard)	20
