= Voy Pa'lla =

- A-side label of vinyl single

Single by Anthony Santos

from the album La Chupadera
- B-side: "Te Vas Amor"
- Released: 1991
- Genre: Bachata
- Length: 3:41
- Label: Platano Records
- Songwriter: Antony Santos

Anthony Santos singles chronology
"Voy Pa'lla" (1991)	"Te Vas Amor" (1991)

"Voy Pa'lla" (short for Voy Para Allá; English: "I'm Going Over There") is the debut single by Dominican musician Anthony Santos. It served as the lead single for his debut album, La Chupadera (1991). The song became a huge success as it help Santos reach mainstream fame. It is one of his signature songs and it is considered one of the greatest bachata songs in history.

== Covers ==
- Frank Reyes released a cover of the song in the same year as the original. This cover was released for Reyes' debut album, Tu Serás Mi Reina. This would cause confusion decades later as a lot of people started to wonder who the song actually belonged to. An article by the Diario Oriental (Oriental Journal) mentions that it was possibly that Reyes was the one who had recorded the song first and then Santos made a cover of that same song. Yet, it is unclear whose version is the original as Reyes's version is not as known as Santos's version. But despite the confusion, it is confirmed that Santos is the original performer of the song. This has been confirmed by other bachata artist, historians, and even Santos himself. In a 1996 documentary about his life and career, Santos explained how he wrote the song and what it did for his career.
- Tony Berroa, a Dominican bachata singer, released a cover for his 1992 studio album El Solterito Del Este Y Los Reyes Del Este.
- Las Chicas del Can, a merengue band, released a cover in 1992 for their tenth studio album, Explosivo.

== Remixes ==
In 2019, he released a merengue remix with Dominican rapper, Vakero. They released it with the title "Voy Pa Allá".

== Charts ==
Chart performance for Voy Pa Allá (Remix)
Chart (2019)	Peak position
Dominican Republic Merengue (Monitor Latino)	4
