= Que Vuelvas (Anthony Santos song) =

2018 single by Anthony Santos

Single by Anthony Santos

from the album La Historia De Mi Vida: El Final, Vol. 1
- Released: June 28, 2018
- Genre: Bachata
- Length: 4:48
- Label: DASM LLC

Anthony Santos singles chronology
"Por Mujeres Voy A Morir" (2017)	"Que Vuelvas" (2018)	"Bellas" (2018)

"Que Vuelvas" (English: "Come Back") is a song by Dominican singer Anthony Santos. The song was released on June 28, 2018. It served as the first single for Anthony's twenty-third studio album La Historia De Mi Vida: El Final, Vol. 1 (2018). The title of the song originally did not have the letter "s" when it was released as a single, which meant the song was titled as "Que Vuelva". Then when the album was released, the letter "s" was added to the title, thus renaming it "Que Vuelvas".

== Charts ==
Chart (2018)	Peak position
Dominican Republic Bachata (Monitor Latino)	1
Dominican Republic General (Monitor Latino)	2
US Tropical Airplay (Billboard)	12
