= Melymel =

Dominican rapper, singer and actress (born 1988)

- Melymel in 2019

Background information
- Born: Melony Redondo; 6 May 1988 (age 38); Santo Domingo, Dominican Republic
- Genres: Hip hop; latin pop
- Occupations: Rapper; singer; songwriter; record producer; actress
- Instruments: Vocals
- Years active: 2005–present
- Labels: DiModer Music; El Ritmo Records; Empire

Melymel (born 6 May 1988) is a Dominican rapper, singer and actress known as "La Mama del Rap".

== Early life ==
Melony was born on May 6, 1988, in Santo Domingo, Dominican Republic. In 1998 she started becoming interested in rapping, in her childhood she was influenced in this genre by American rapper Tupac, when she heard him for the first time at only 8 years old. At the age of 12 she began to write verses and developed Freestyle abilities.

== Career ==
She recorded her first song in 2005 after meeting producer Nico Clinico member of Dominican group JN3, she released her first R&B and Hip hop song on 2006 titled "Fresa" which led her to be the opening act for rappers N.O.R.E and Tony Touch.

In 2007 she released her first mixtape Sensacion Mermelada which met success in New York and South Africa.

She released her eponymous debut studio album in 2011 Melymel, in 2014 she released her sophomore studio album Eva Del Rap, in 2015 she released her fourth Untese and in 2018 she released her last studio album titled Dragon Queen.

In 2019 she collaborated with Ivy Queen in a song called "Se te apagó la luz".

Her music video for her single "IDGAF" has reached 5 million views on YouTube, while her music videos for "Si No Te Amara", "Su Calor", "No One" with Mozart La Para" and "Mente Daña" reached over 17 million views, 2.8 million views, 2.7 million views, and 1.8 million views respectively.

== Artistry ==
Melymel is known for the fierce and raw honesty of her lyricism. She has named Tupac and Lauryn Hill as her musical heroes, calling them "her two biggest inspirations". She also stated that "Kendrick Lamar for her is the rapper that most resembles what Tupac used to do back in the day, so he's like her actual crush."

She also cited reggaeton female singer Ivy Queen as one of her inspirations explaining that "I feel identified with Ivy, since I have experienced many things that she experienced in the genre because she is a woman and I have come away with scars, but stronger than ever, it is an achievement for my career to be able to collaborate with one of my idols".

== Legacy ==
Melymel has been referred to as "The Mother of Rap" in her country for being the first female rapper to be launched in the Dominican Republic, she is the most respected female rapper in rap genre there.

She stated in an interview that "That it was a struggle to gain the level of respect she wanted, resources were scarce and support was limited, but eventually she managed to entrench herself in the movement, and grow along with it". Billboard praised her rap legacy in 2017, stating she "...is easily one of the most gifted lyricists in the Latin rap game".

Chicago Tribune emphasized in an article that "Before Cardi B or Natti Natasha, there was already a woman with strong presence in Urban music, that was Melymel, who since 2005 began to make a place by herself in her country's scene."

== Discography ==
- Melymel
- Eva Del Rap
- Untese
- Dragon Queen

== Filmography ==
As an actress she appeared in 10 films.

Year	Production	Role
2014	Loca y Atrapadas	Lola
2017	Voces De La Calle	Angie
2017	Mission Star	Blanca
2017	Todas Las Mujeres Son Iguales	Invited
2018	Hermanos	Marina
2019	Kanibarú	Invited
2019	El Equpito, Todo Por Una Herencia	Sussy
2020	The Caribbean (All in Exclusive)	Alma Damaris
2021	El Ídolo	Invited
2022	La Trampa	Patricia
